= List of sewing stitches =

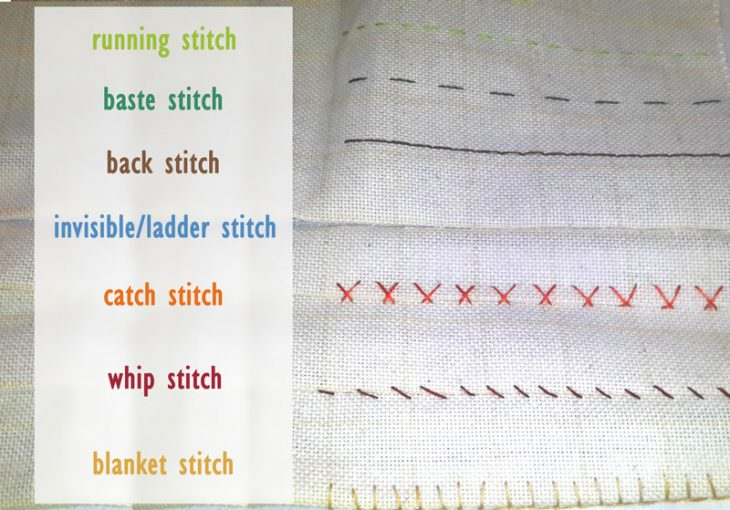
types of hand sewing stitches

This is a list of stitches used in hand and machine sewing. The most common standard for stitches in the apparel industry is ASTM International ASTM D6193-16(2020) The standard also covers various types of seams.

Under this classification of stitches there are basic groups as follows:

- Class 100 - Single Thread Chainstitch
- Class 200 - Hand Stitches
- Class 300 - Lock Stitch
- Class 400 - Multi-thread Chain Stitch
- Class 500 - Over-edge Chain Stitch
- Class 600 - Covering Chain Stitch

== Examples of machine stitches ==
- Chain stitch
- Lockstitch
- Zigzag stitch
- Running stitch
- Back stitch
- Satin stitch
- Overlock stitch

== Types of hand stitches ==
- Back tack – backward stitch to anchor tacking or basting
- Backstitch – sturdy hand stitch for seams and decoration
- Basting stitch (US) – for reinforcement or for temporarily holding fabric in place (same as tacking stitch)
- Blanket stitch – used to finish an unhemmed blanket
- Blind stitch (or hemstitch) – type of slip stitch used for inconspicuous hem
- Buttonhole stitch – for reinforcing buttonholes and preventing cut fabric from raveling
- Chain stitch – hand or machine stitch for seams or decoration
- Cross-stitch – usually used for decoration, but may also be used for seams
- Catch stitch (also 'flat' and 'blind' -catch stitch) – flat looped stitch used in hemming
- Darning stitch – for repairing holes or worn areas in fabric or knitting
- Embroidery stitch – one or more stitches forming a figure of recognizable appearance
- Hemstitch (Hemming stitch) – decorative technique for embellishing the hem of clothing or household linens
- Ladder stitch or mattress stitch – for invisibly closing seams from the outside, e.g. to close a pillow after being stuffed
- Overcast stitch – used to enclose a raw, or unfinished, seam or edge
- Pad stitch – secures two or more layers of fabric together and provide firmness
- Pick stitch – hand stitch that catches only a few threads on the wrong side of the fabric, difficult to produce nicely so typically used for hemming high quality garments
- Running stitch – hand stitch for seams and gathering
- Saddle stitch - alternating running stitches
- Sailmaker's stitch – may refer to any of the hand stitches used for stitching canvas sails, including the flat stitch, round stitch, baseball stitch, herringbone stitch.
- Slip stitch – form of blind stitch for fastening two pieces of fabric together from the right side without the thread showing
- Stoating – used to join two pieces of woven material, such that the resulting stitches are not visible from the right side of the cloth
- Straight stitch – the basic stitch in hand-sewing and embroidery
- Tacking stitch (UK, also baste or pin) – quick, temporary stitching intended to be removed
- Tent stitch – diagonal embroidery stitch at a 45-degree angle
- Topstitch – used on garment edges such as necklines and hems, helps facings stay in place and gives a crisp edge
- Whipstitch – for protecting edges

== See also ==
- List of sewing machine brands
- List of sewing tools and equipment
