= Bar tack =

Stitches used to reinforce areas of a garment

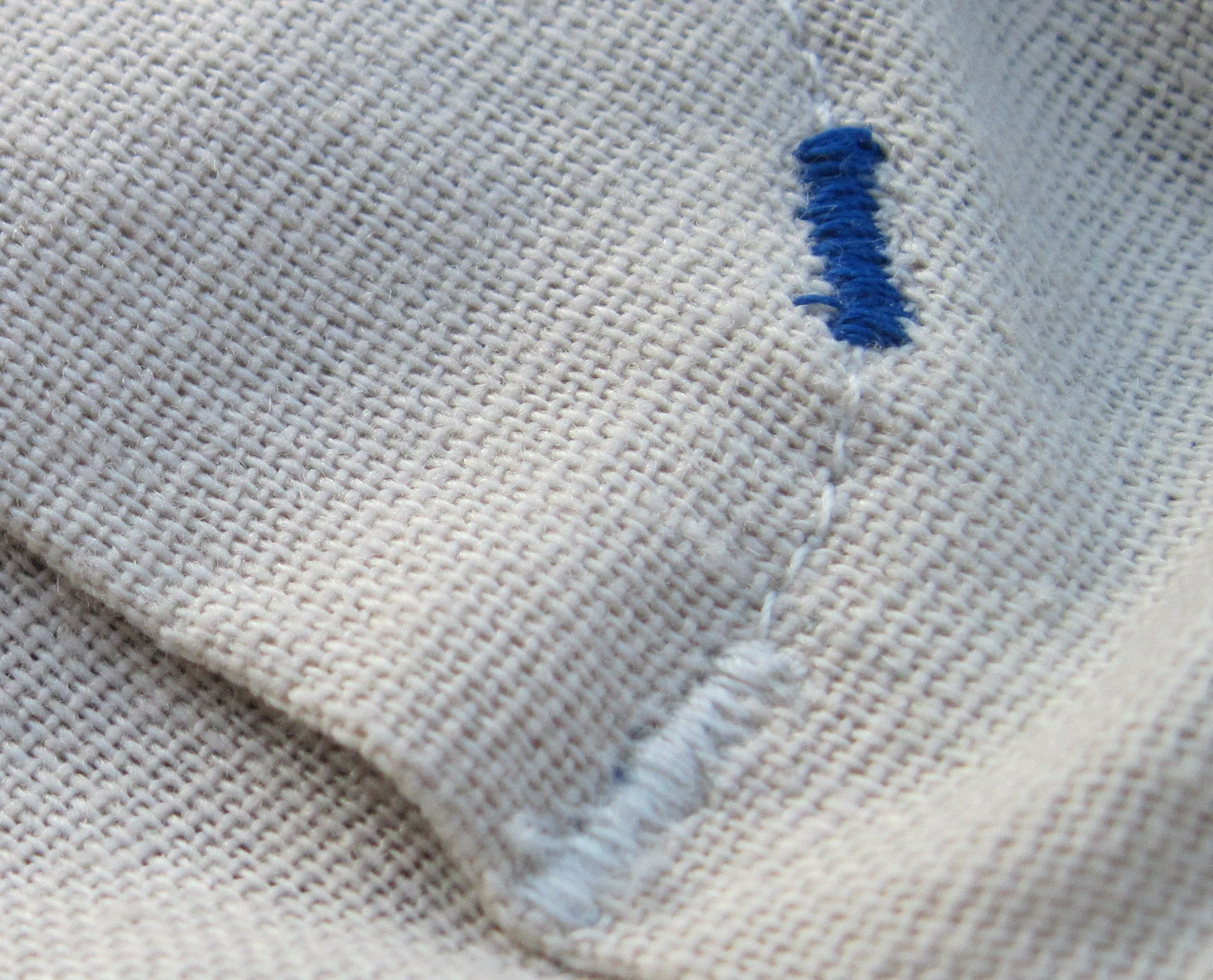
Bar tacks, such as these machine-sewn ones, may be used to reinforce the bottom of a fly opening.

In sewing, bar tack, also written bar-tack or bartack, refers to a series of stitches used to reinforce areas of a garment that may be subject to stress or additional wear. Typical areas for bar tack stitches include pocket openings, buttonholes, belt loops, the bottom of a fly opening, tucks, pleats and the corners of collars. Bar tacks may be sewn by hand, using whip stitches, or by machine, using zigzag stitches. The process for sewing a bar tack is essentially to sew several long, narrowly spaced stitches along the line of the bar that will be formed, followed by short stitches made perpendicular to the long stitches, through the fabric and over the bar. The bar commonly varies between 1/16 to 1/8 inch (1.6 to 3.2 mm) in width and 1/4 to 3/8 inch (6.4 to 9.5 mm) in length. In some garments, such as jeans, the bar tack will be sewn in a contrasting color.

Similar stitches to the bar tack include the arrowhead tack and crow's foot tack.

== See also ==
- List of sewing stitches
- Tack (sewing)
- Whip stitch
