= Pin weaving =

Small-scale weaving technique

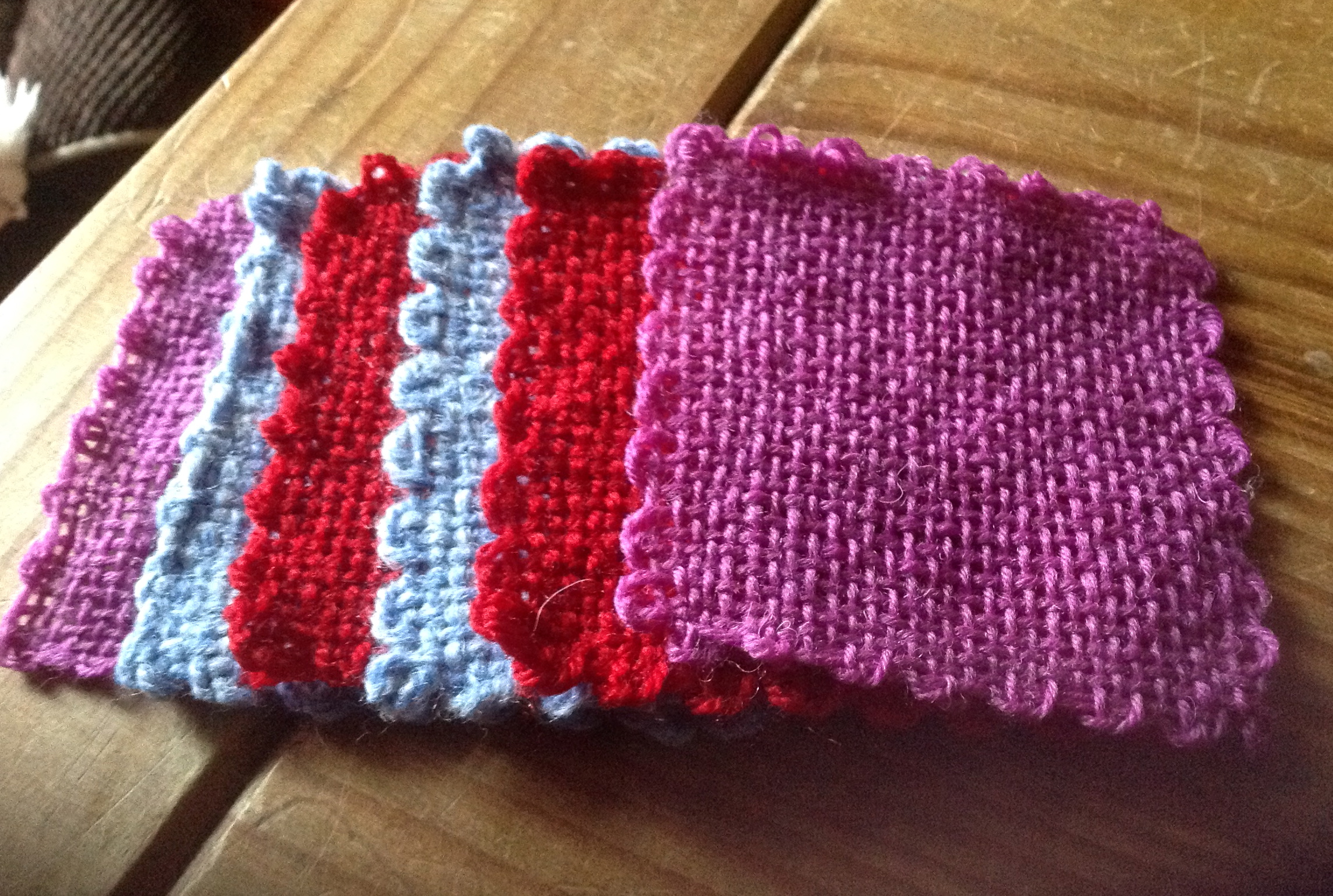
Finished pin-woven squares, with four selvages

Pin weaving is a form of small-scale weaving traditionally done on a frame made of pins; the warp and weft are wrapped around the pins. Pin-woven textiles have a selvage edge all the way around.

Pin looms were popular from the 1930s to the 1960s. Quite elaborate patterns were published, especially in the 1930s.

21st-century designs often focus more on the fiber than on elaborate patterning; for instance, yarns with precisely repeating colours can be used to make plaids.

== Equipment ==
The equipment needed is minimal, consisting of pins, a pinnable board, and a bodkin needle. It can also be done on some types of knitting frame. There are also commercial looms made for pin weaving. Smooth, rounded pin tops are desirable; they don't snag the yarn or fingers. Pins are usually spaced 1/4 to 1/8 in (6 to 3 mm) apart. The pins may be numbered (with numbers written beside the pins), and the lower-left corner may be marked, for ease of reference when working patterns. Ideally, the background should contrast with the threads.

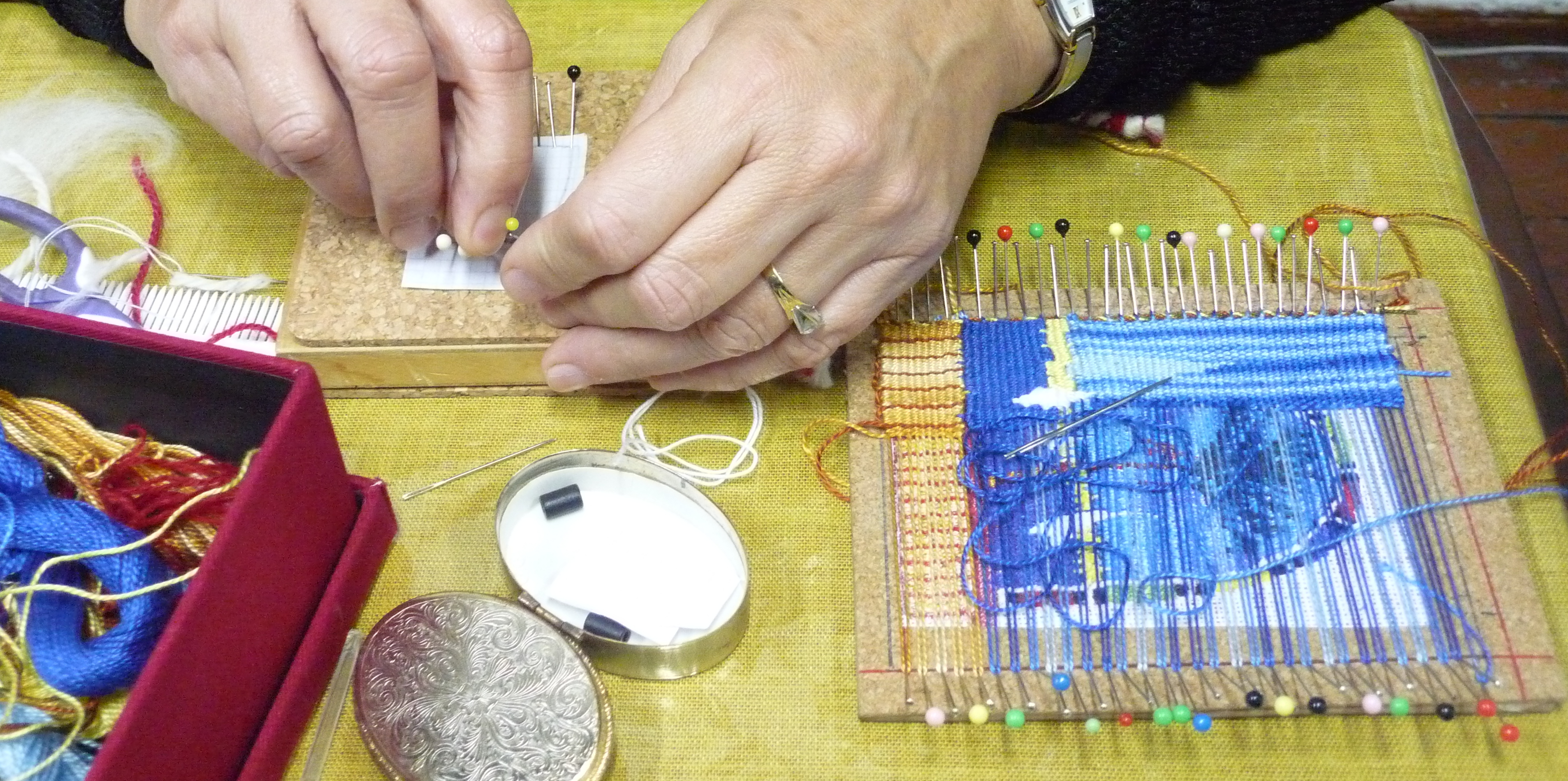
Weaving by wrapping the warp and weft threads between pins stuck into a pinnable surface (in this case, cork; foamcore is also used.).

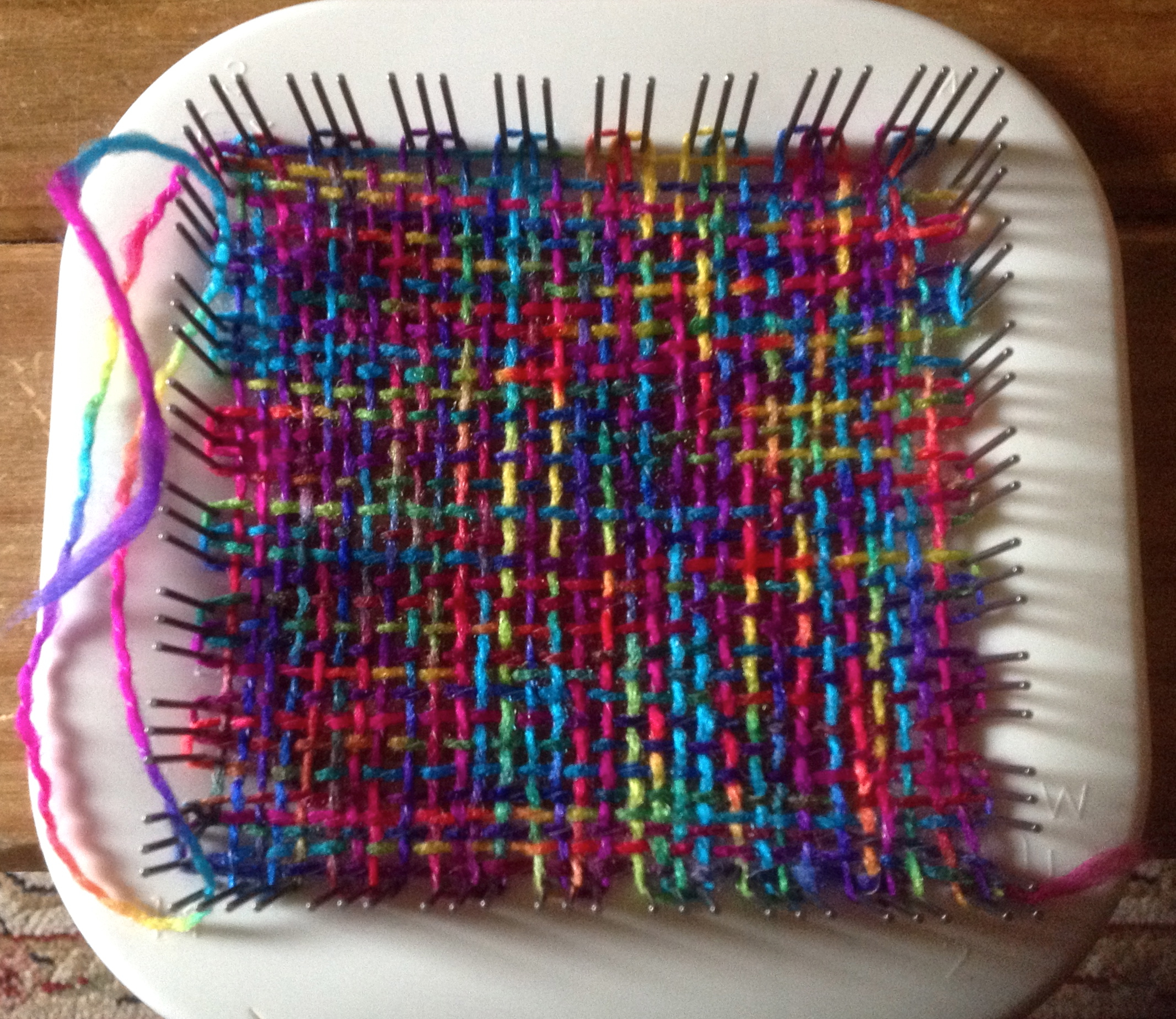
Pin weaving on a mass-produced pin loom

== Weaves ==
For plain tabby weaves, only every other thread in one direction (a quarter of the yarns) is inserted over-and-under with a needle. The others are wrapped in layers; first the odd warps, then the odd counterwarps (at 90 degrees to the warp threads), then the even warp threads. The counterwarps thus pass alternately over and under the warps, but they do it in parallel, passing over and under in unison. A weft thread is woven between each pair of counterwarps, passing under where the flanking counterwarps pass over, and vice-versa.

This timesaving method cannot be used for more complex weaves, such as twills. For these, the odd warps are warped, then the even warps are warped (giving the edge loops), and then the weft is woven with the needle. There is no counterwarp.

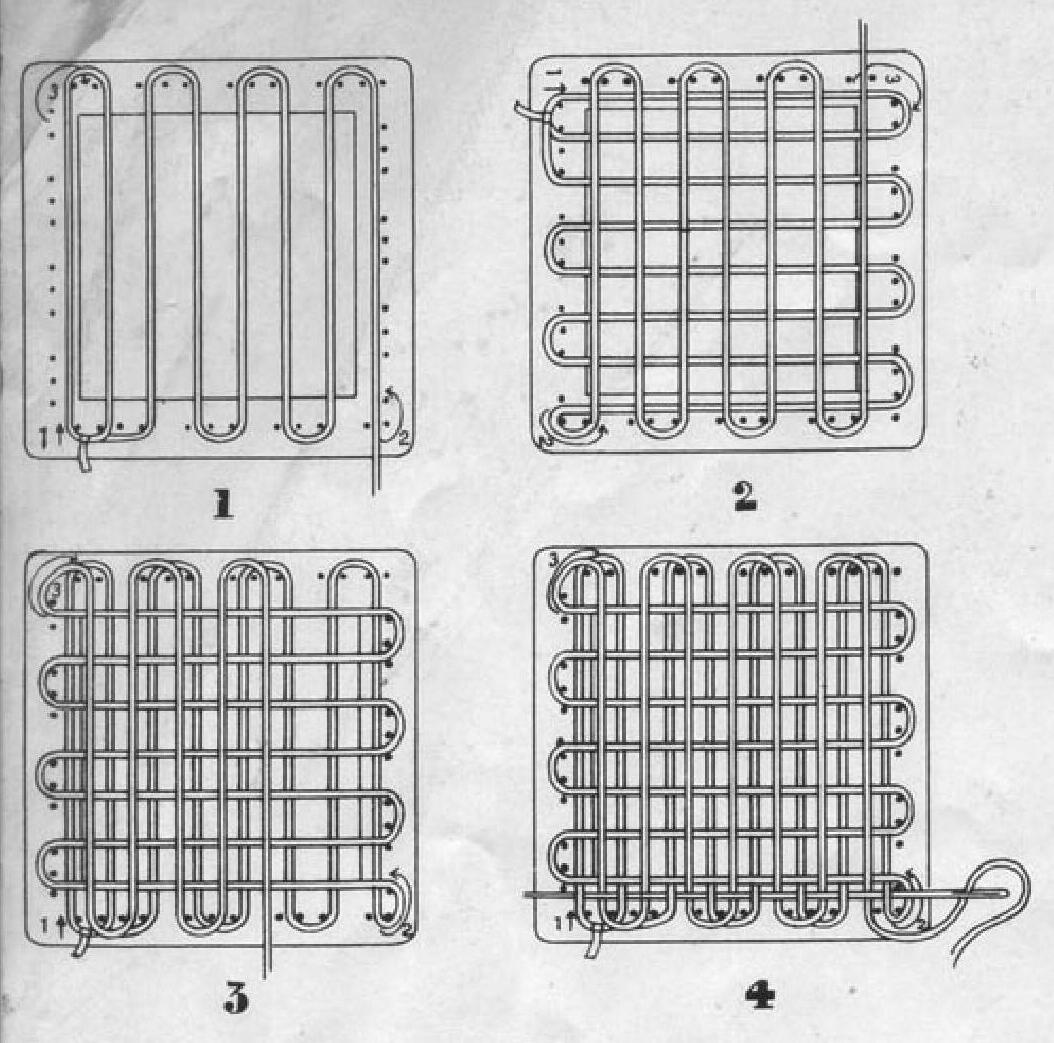
1. Odd warps are warped
2. Odd counterwarps are warped, at right angles to the warps
3. Even warps are warped
4. Weft is woven, filling in the spaces between the counterwarps

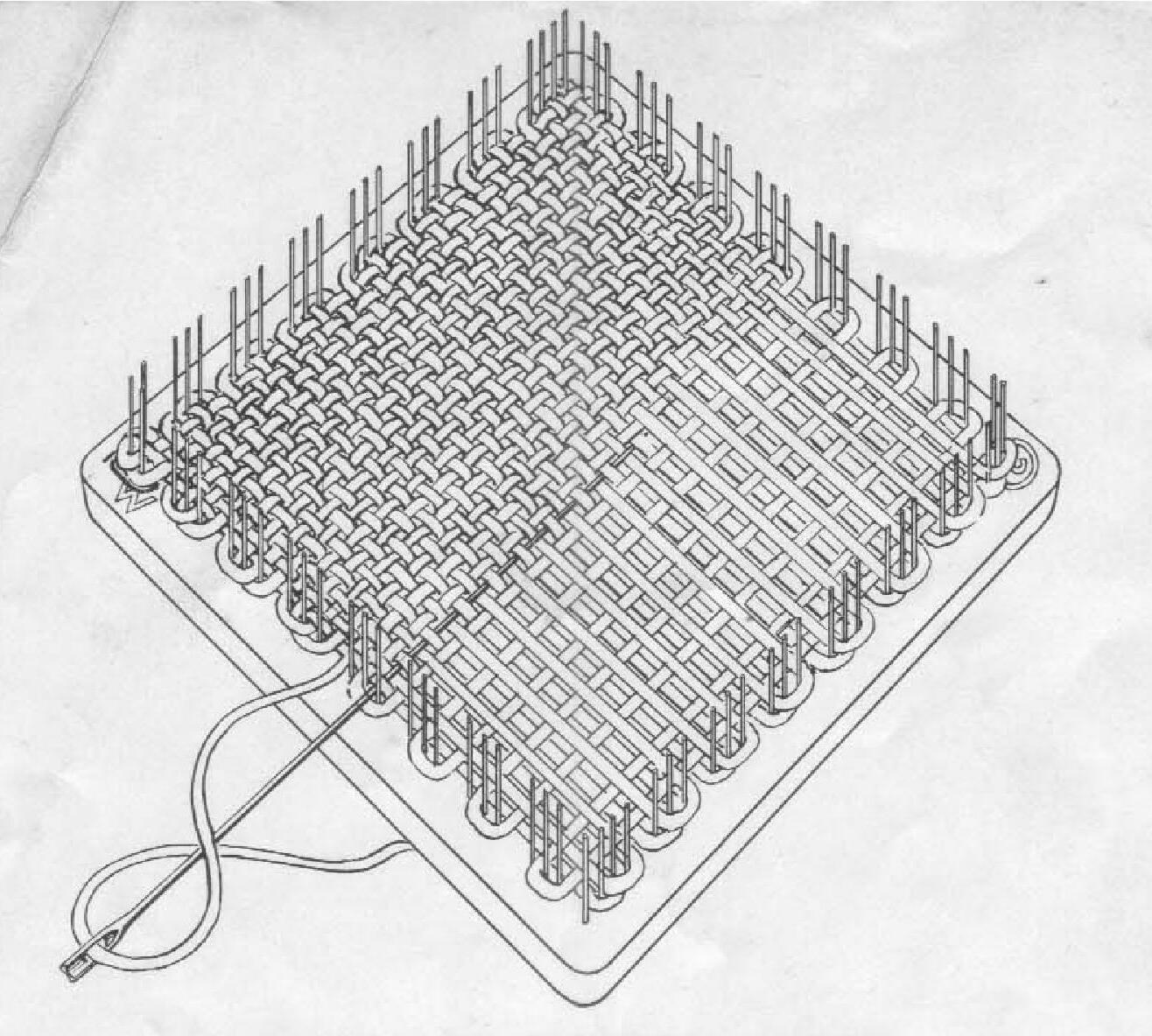
Partway through stage four of a tabby weave, on a commercial loom.

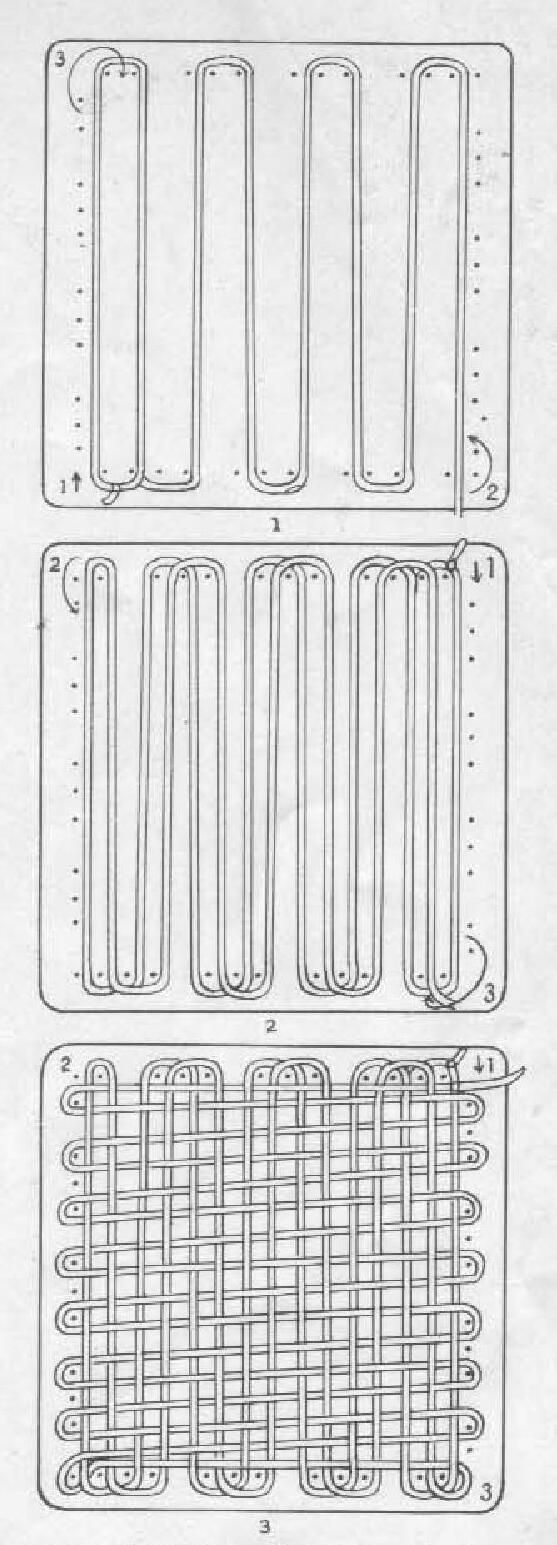
Weaving a twill; no counter-warp.

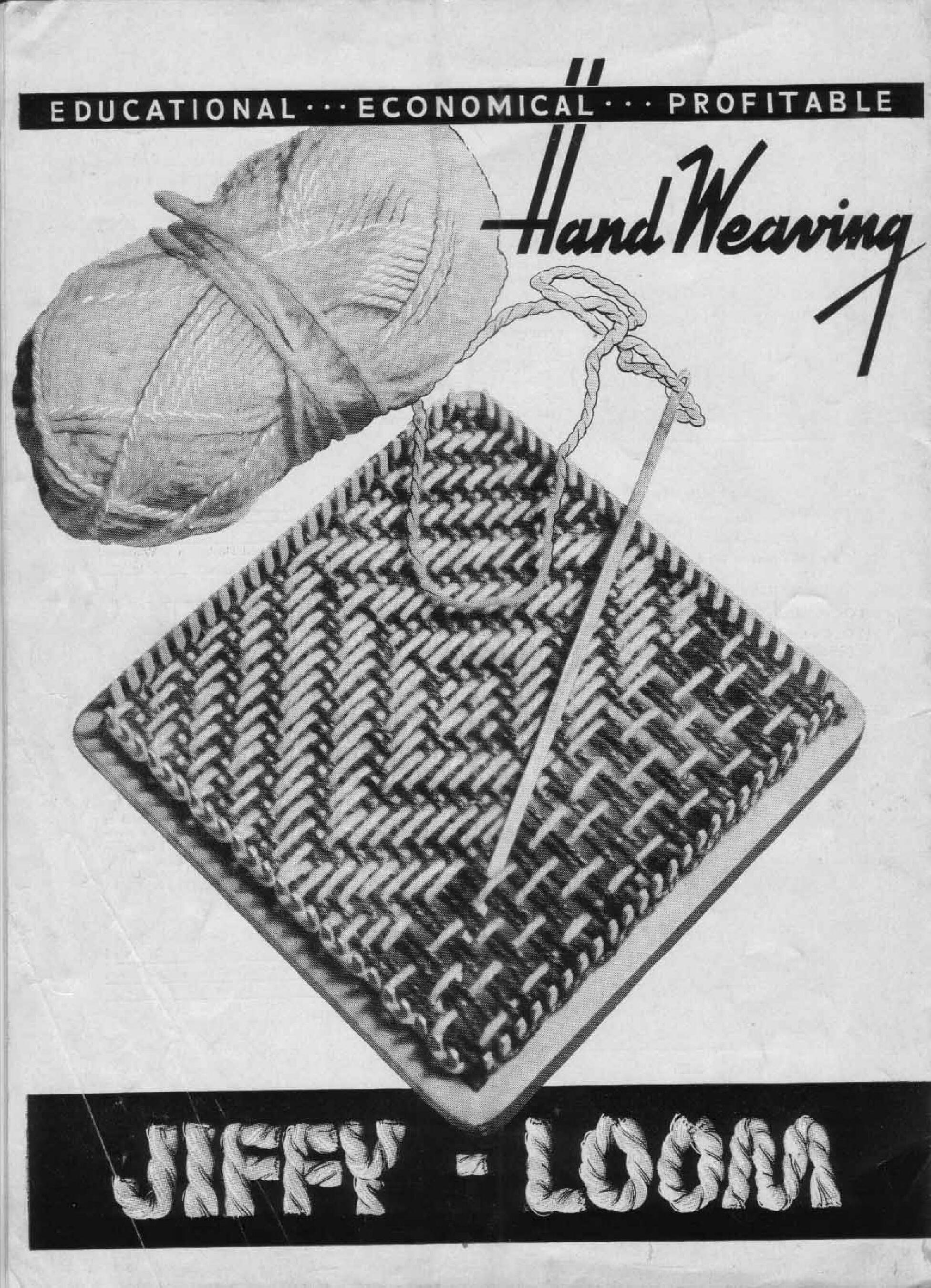
Weaving a patterned twill. Note that an even pin spacing gives an uneven yarn spacing; pins clustered in threes produce an even yarn spacing.

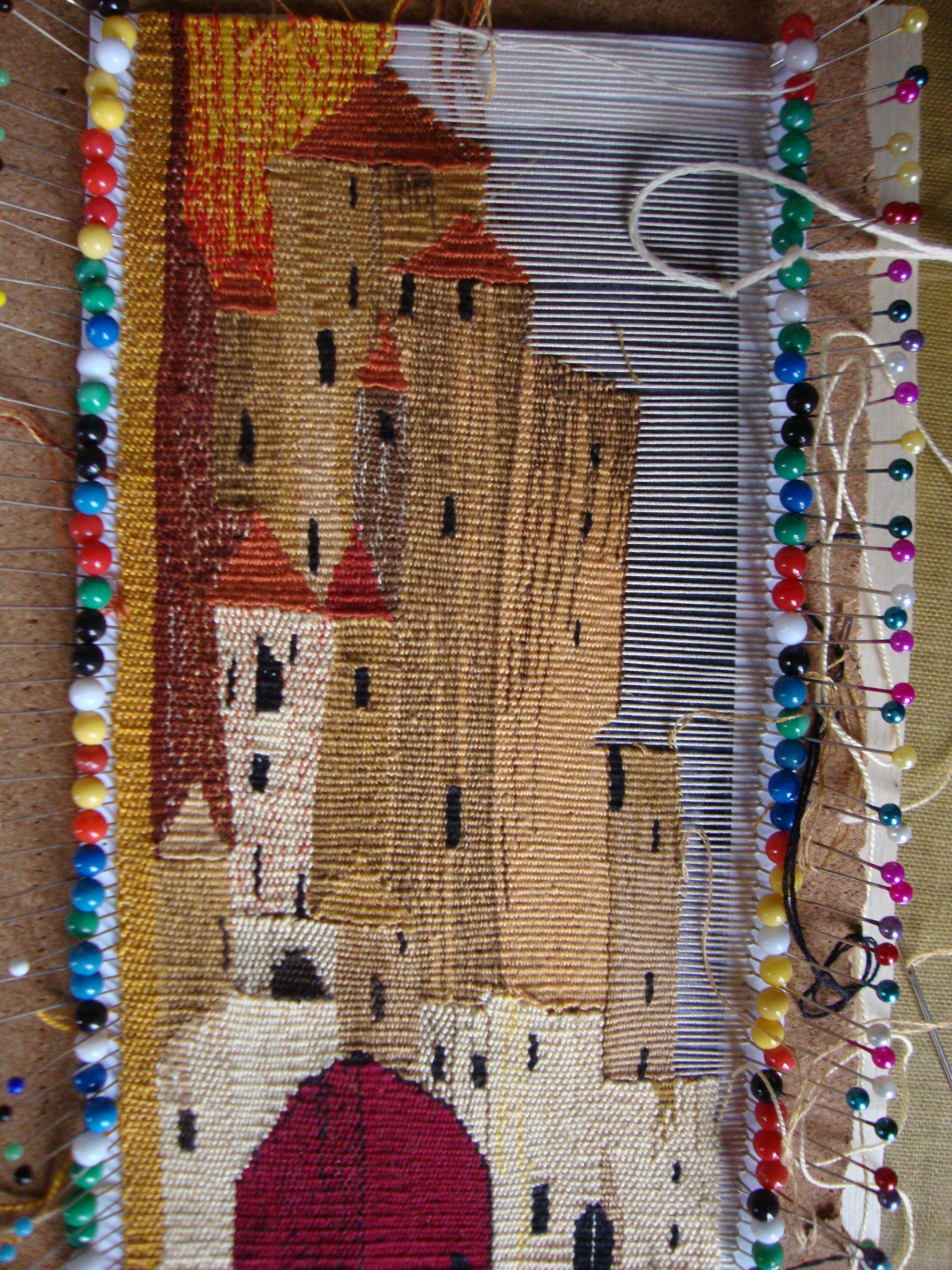
Cotton-and-silk weft-faced tapestry on pins in cork sheet; the complexity of the weft means it has to be woven manually

== Joining and edging ==
Pin-woven textiles are small, and are often stitched together into larger textiles; the finished product has visible seams. Joining methods including whip stitch, cross stitch, running stitch, back stitch; overcast stitch is fast but tends to pucker. In crochet, crocheted slip stitch and single crochet are used, as are knitted 3-needle bind-offs.

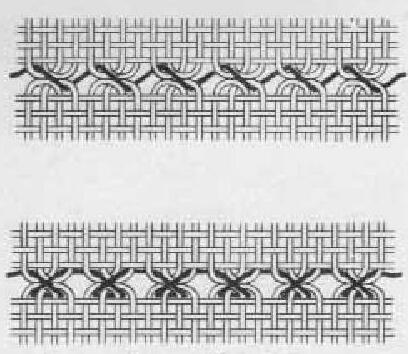
Two joining methods, termed "lacy stitch" and "cross stitch"

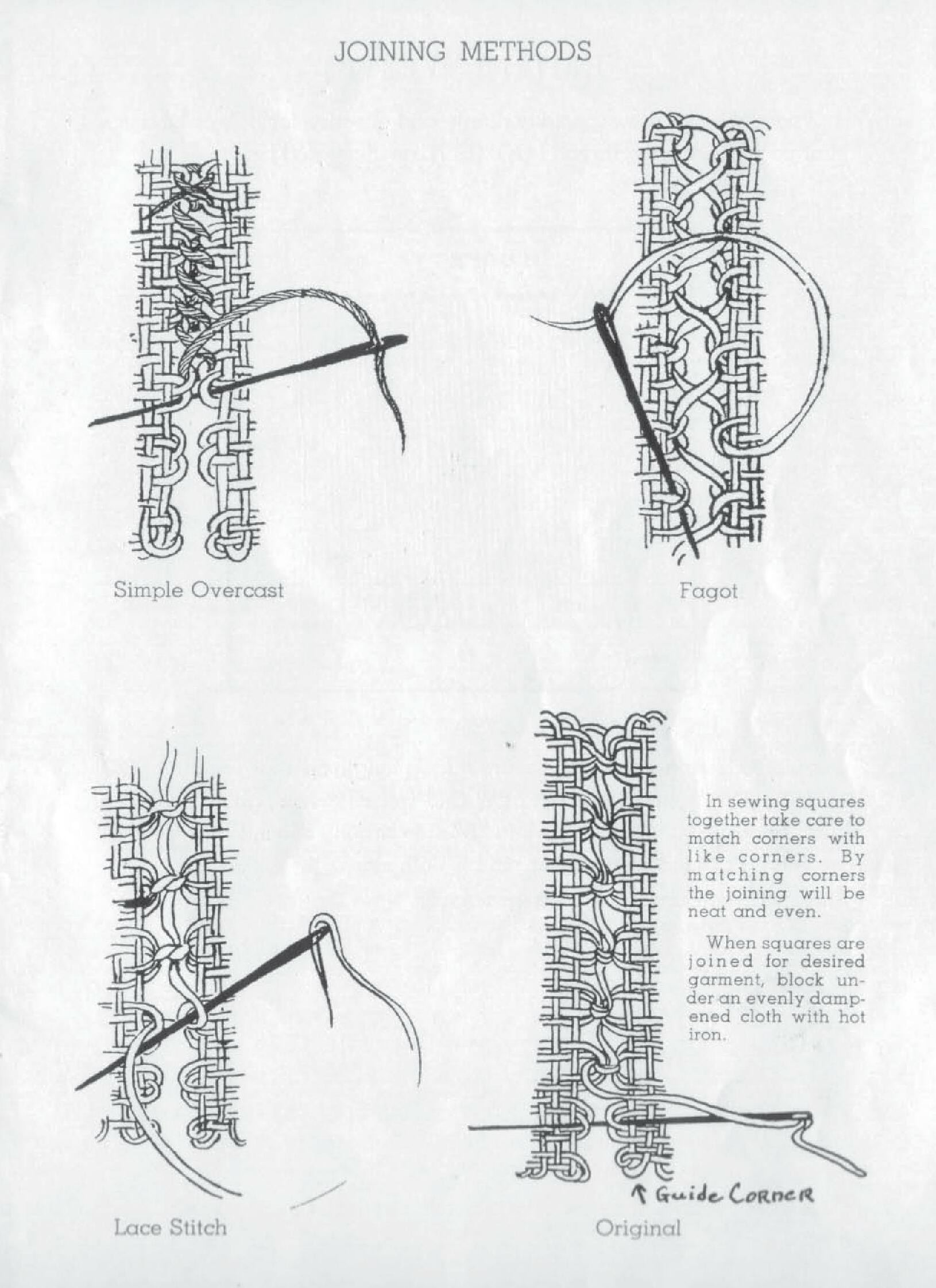
Decorative joining methods: overcast stitch, featherstitches, and an overcast stitch with an extra turn

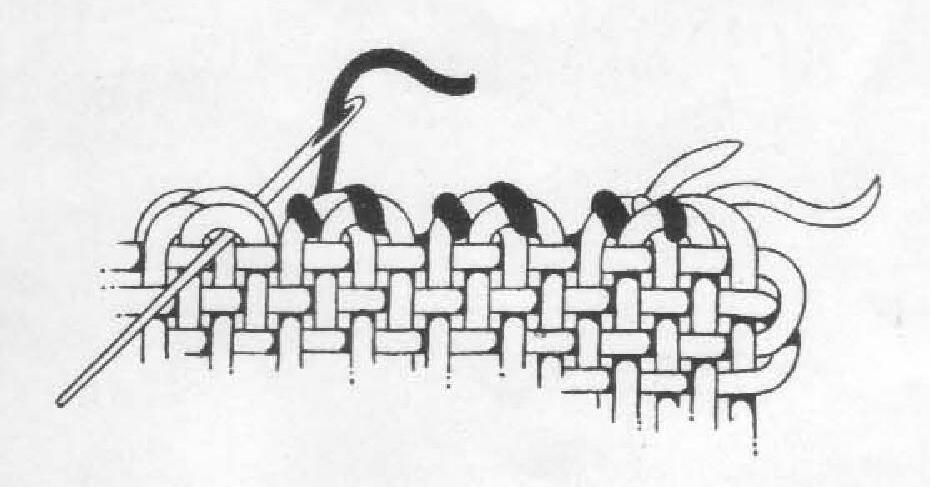
An overcast-stitch join tends to pucker

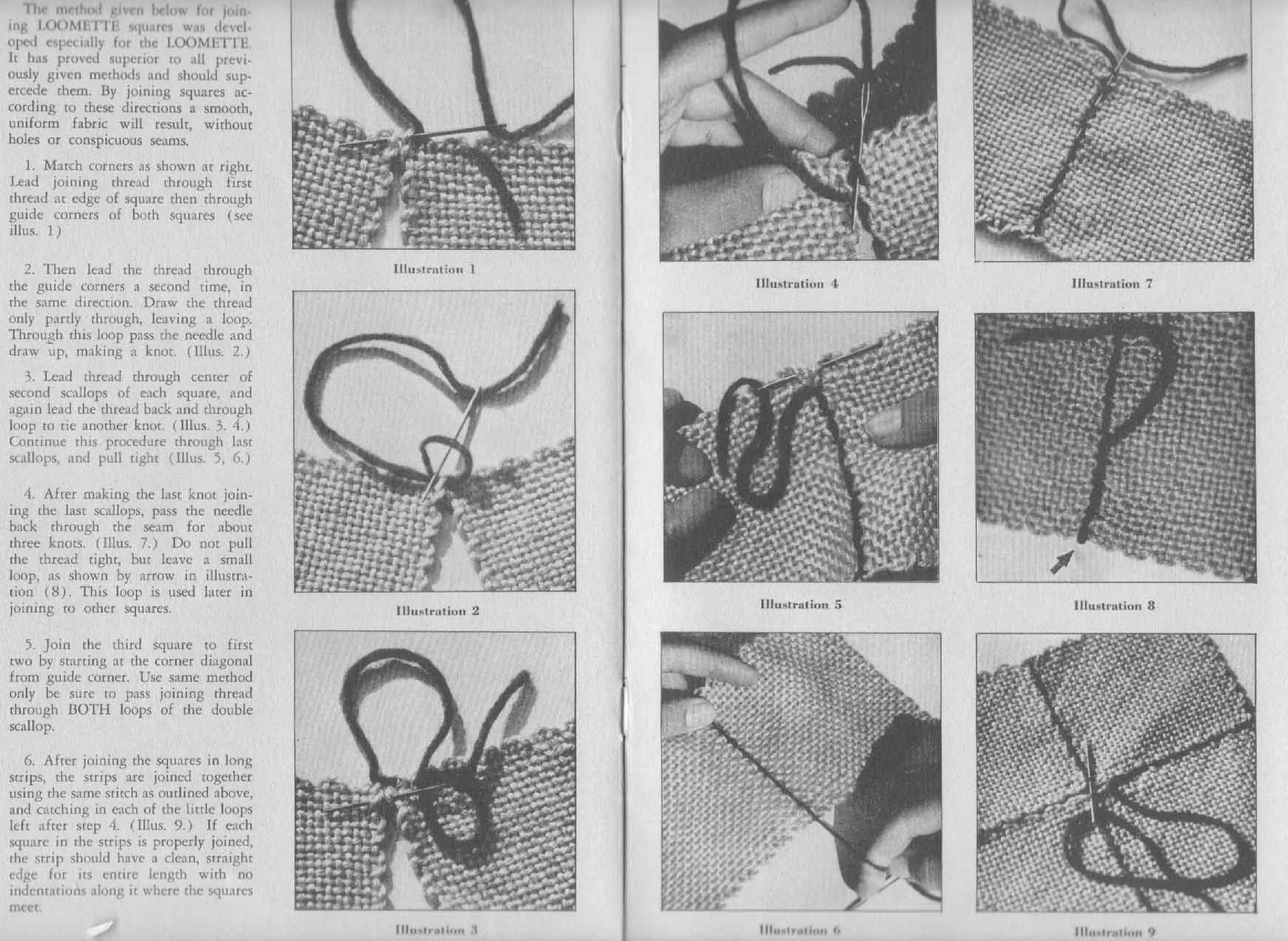
A manual lockstich to create a smoother seam

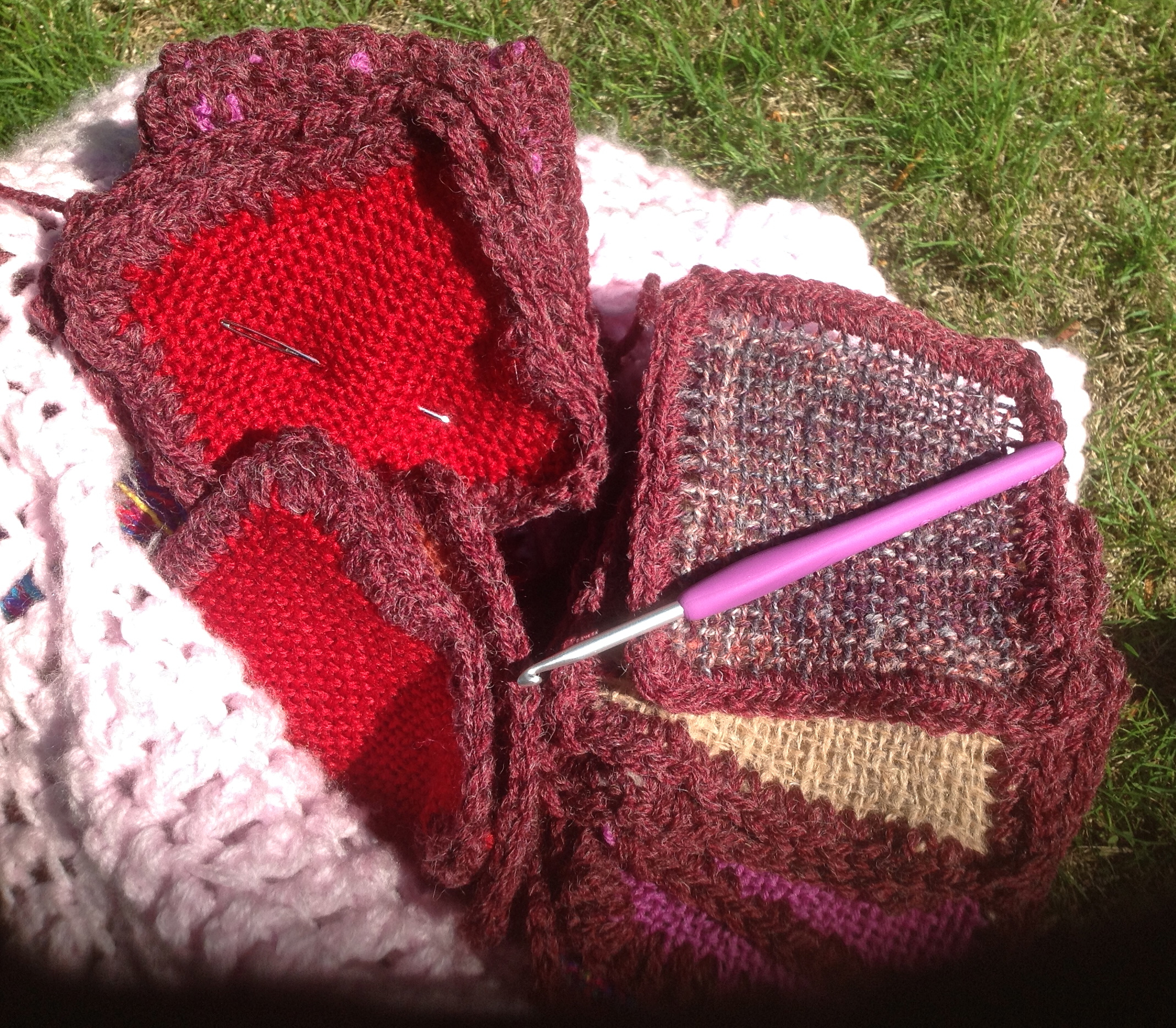
Squares with crochet borders

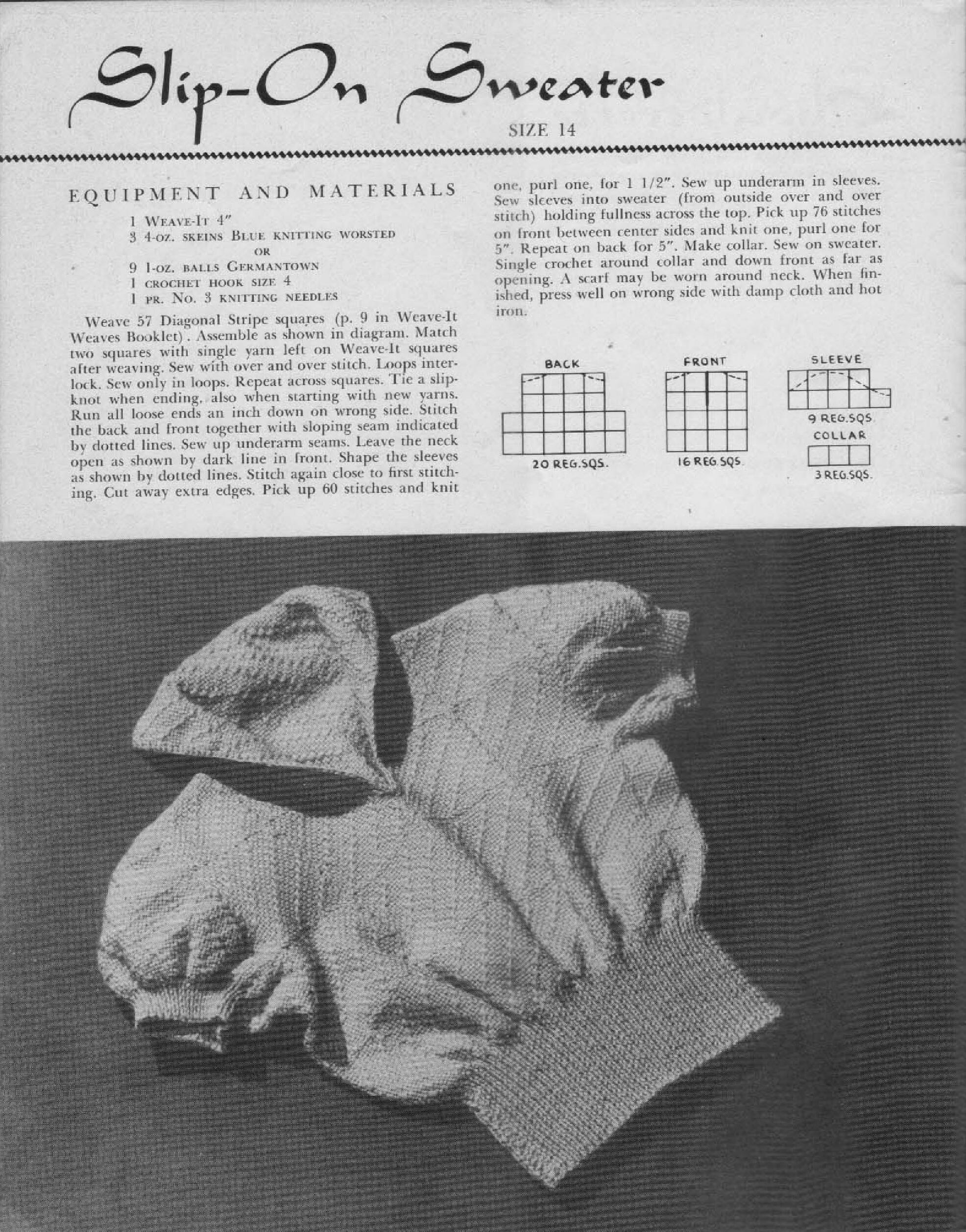
Sweater pattern with waist and cuffs of ribbed knitting, and crochet-edged collar.

== Patterns ==
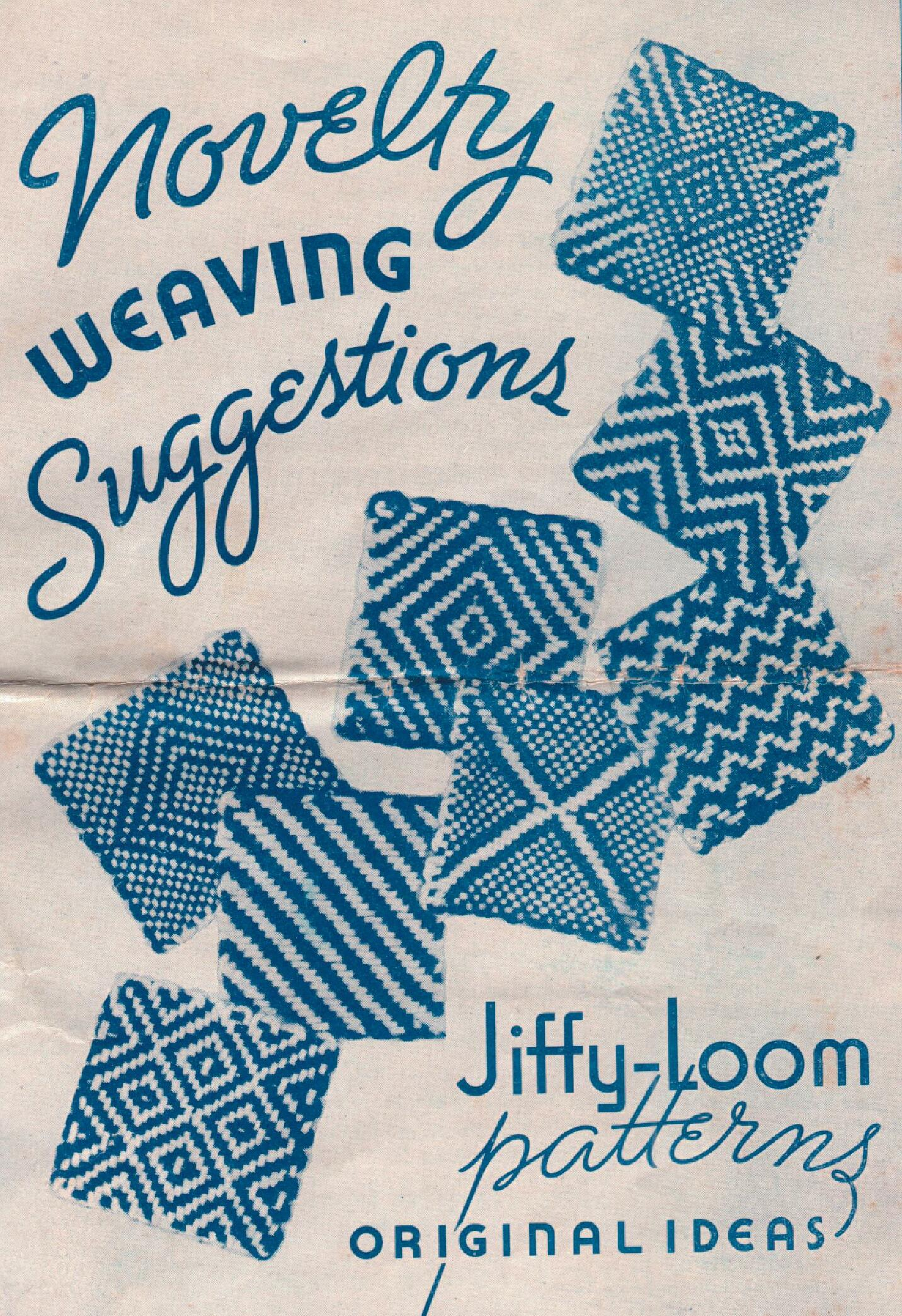
Woven patterns on the cover of a 1937 pattern-book

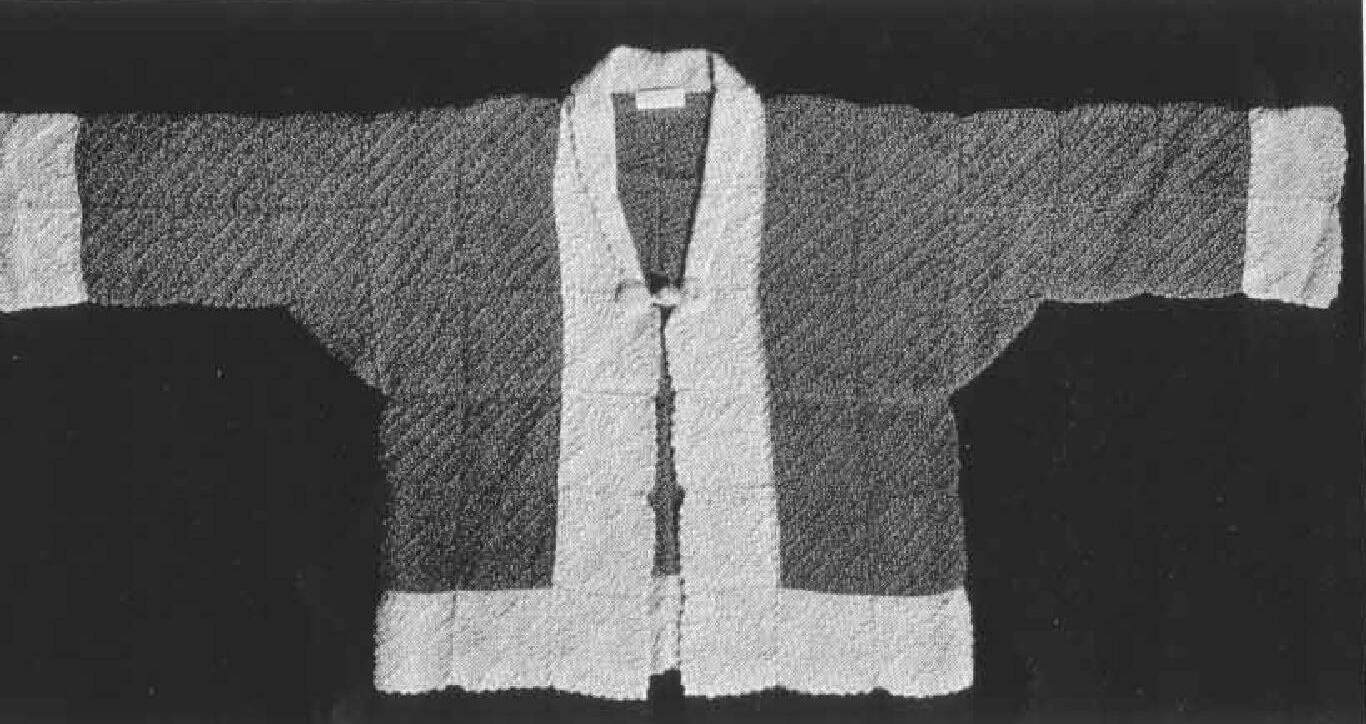
Coat from a 1938 patternbook. Seams between squares can be seen. Note rectangular garment construction, with underarm gussets made from squares folded on the diagonal, and tarikubi collar.

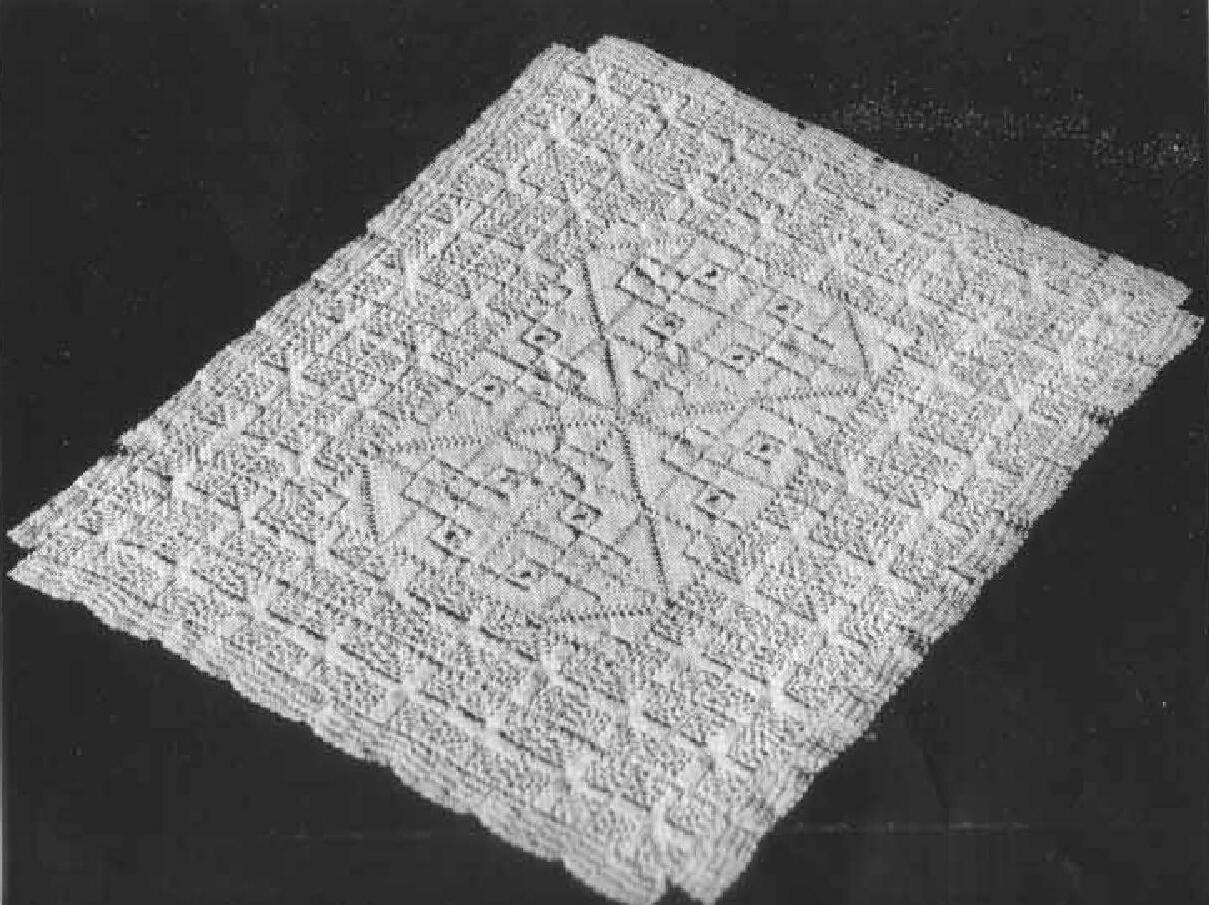
Textured-weave baby blanket from the same pattern book. Seams between squares are used decoratively.

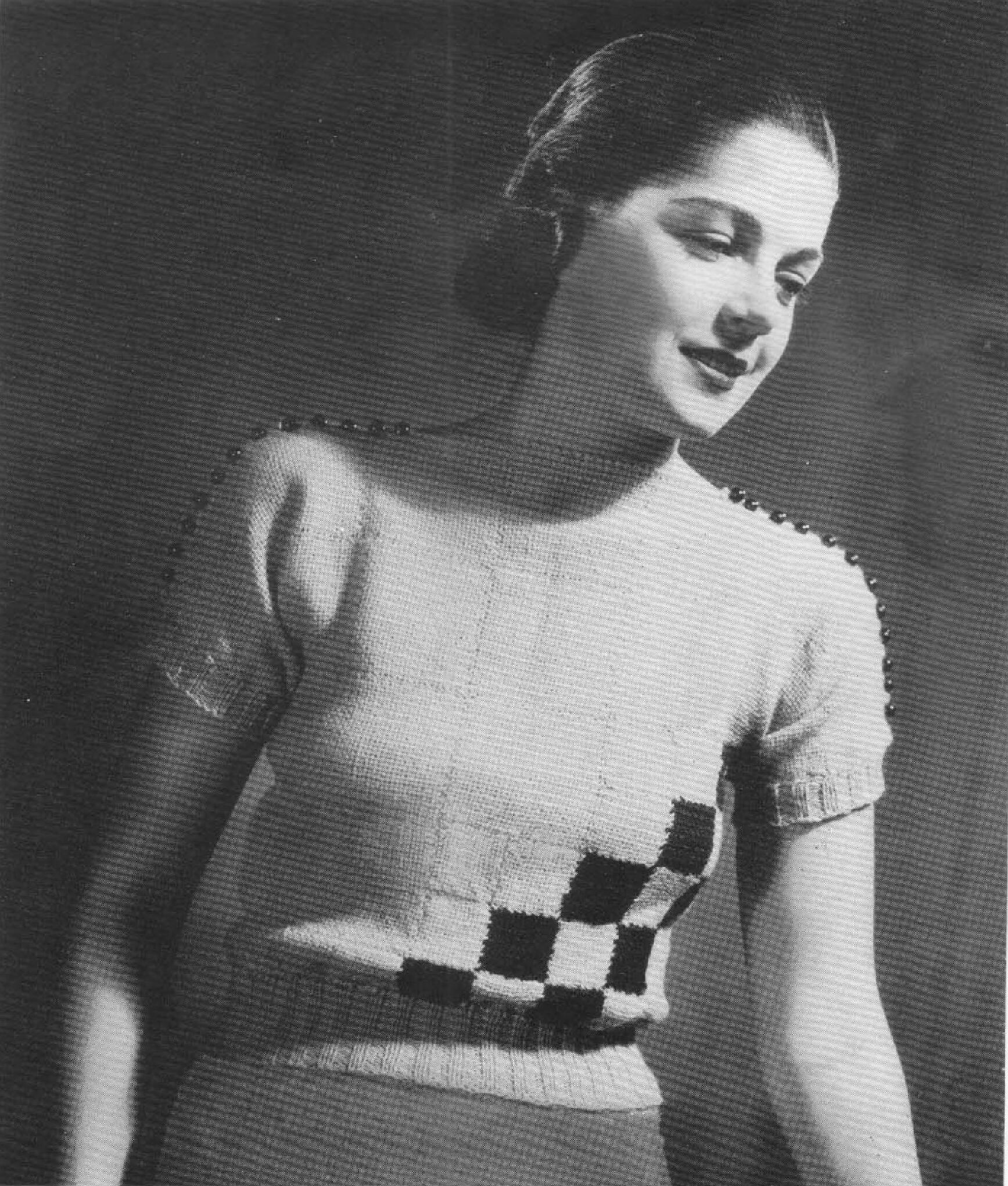
A shoulder-buttoned sweater, made with full-sized and quartered-sized squares (1936 pattern). Knit waist and cuffs.

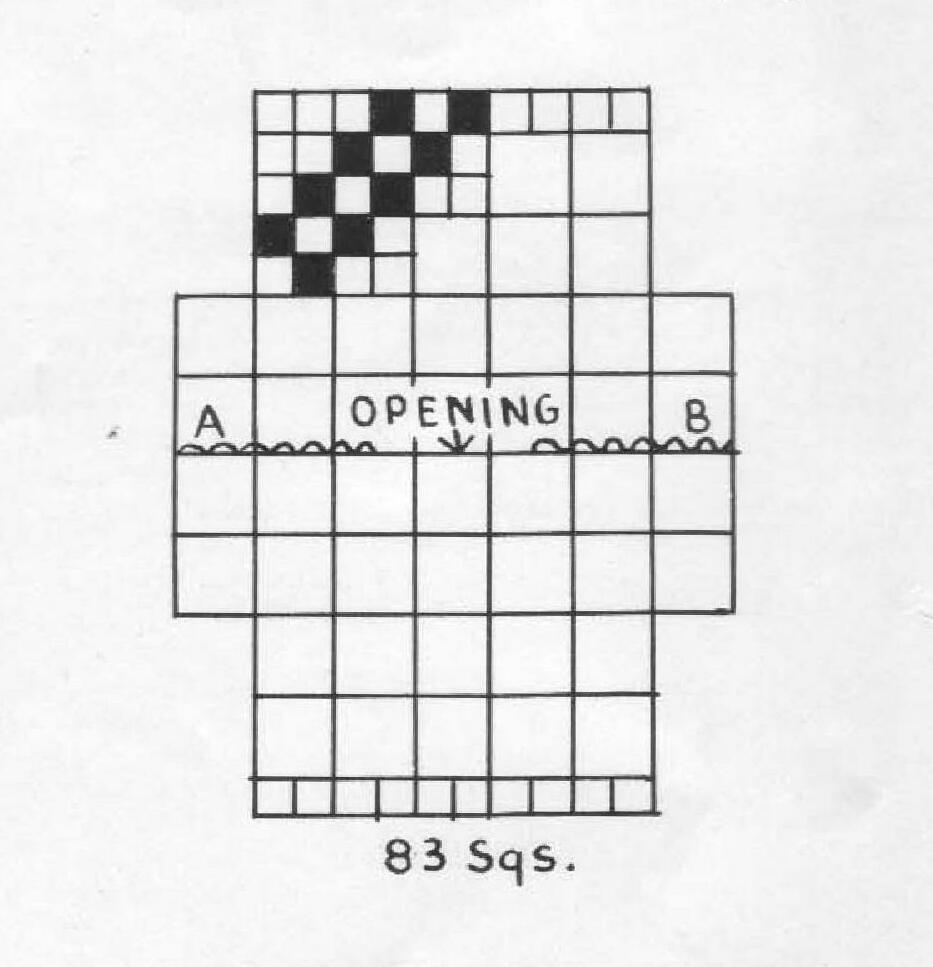
Pattern for the sweater in the previous image, showing rectangular construction.

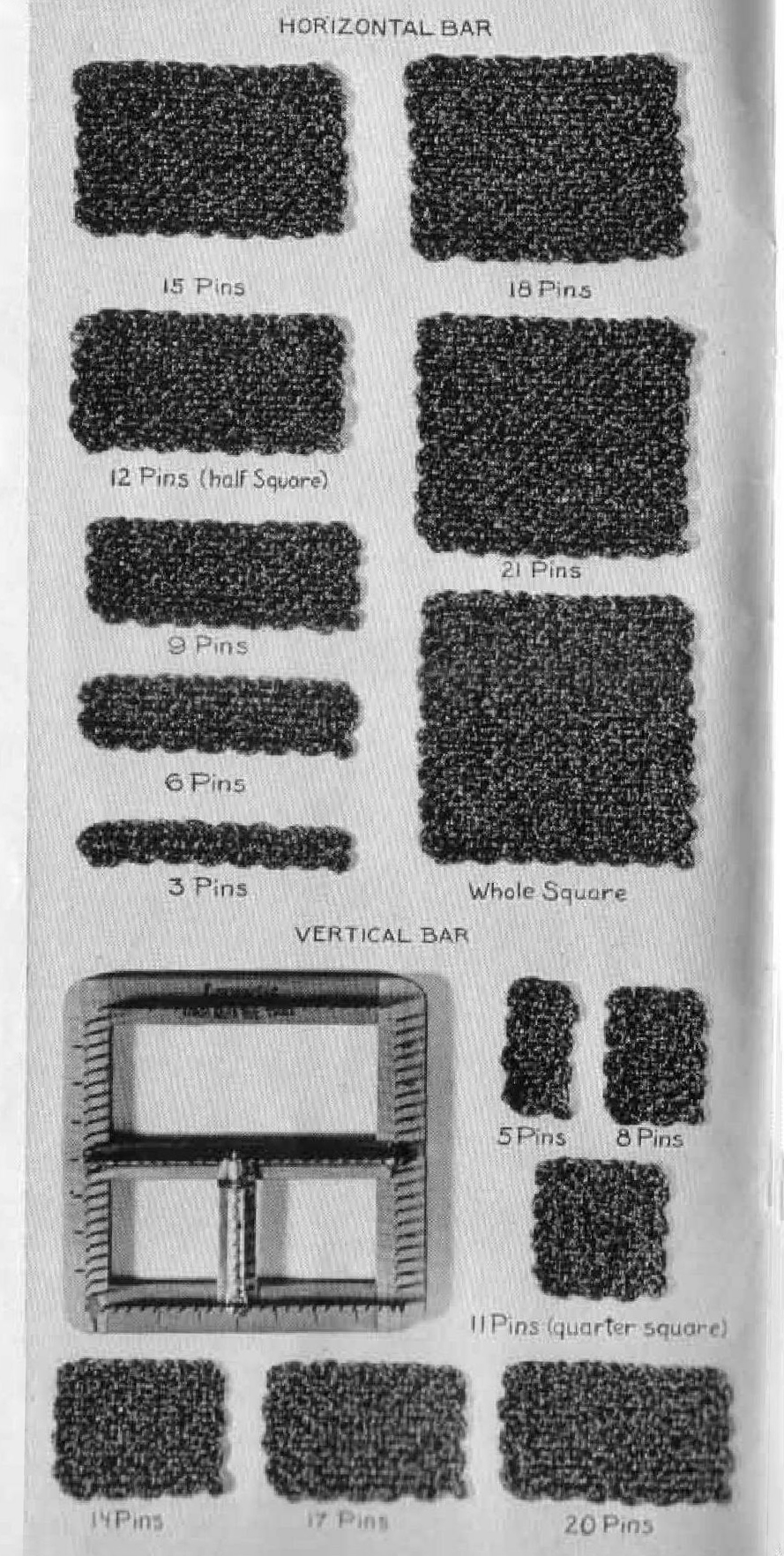
Some commercial looms have bars used to make fractional-sized squares.

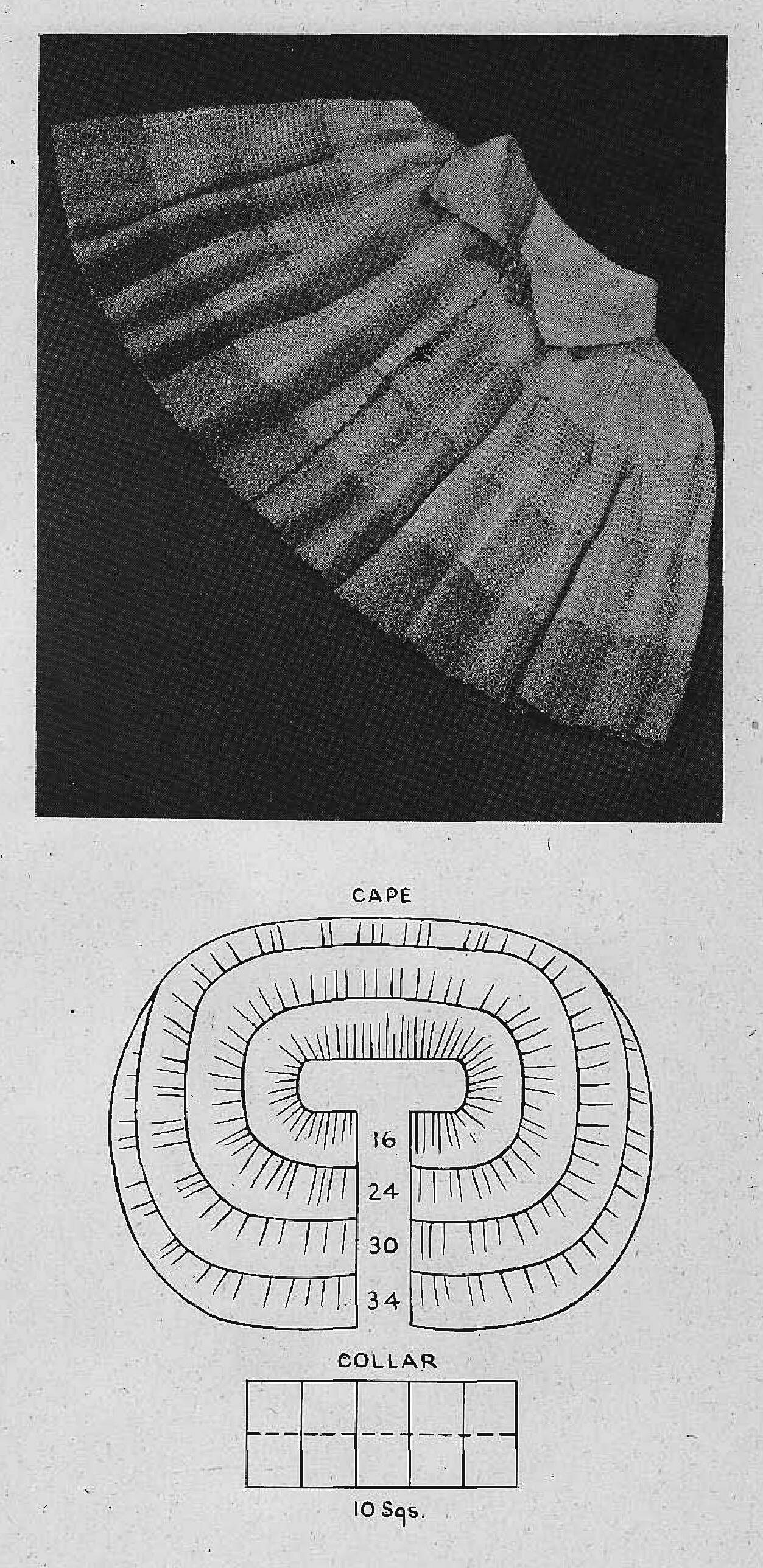
Eased horizontal seams in a pattern for an evening cape, 1937.

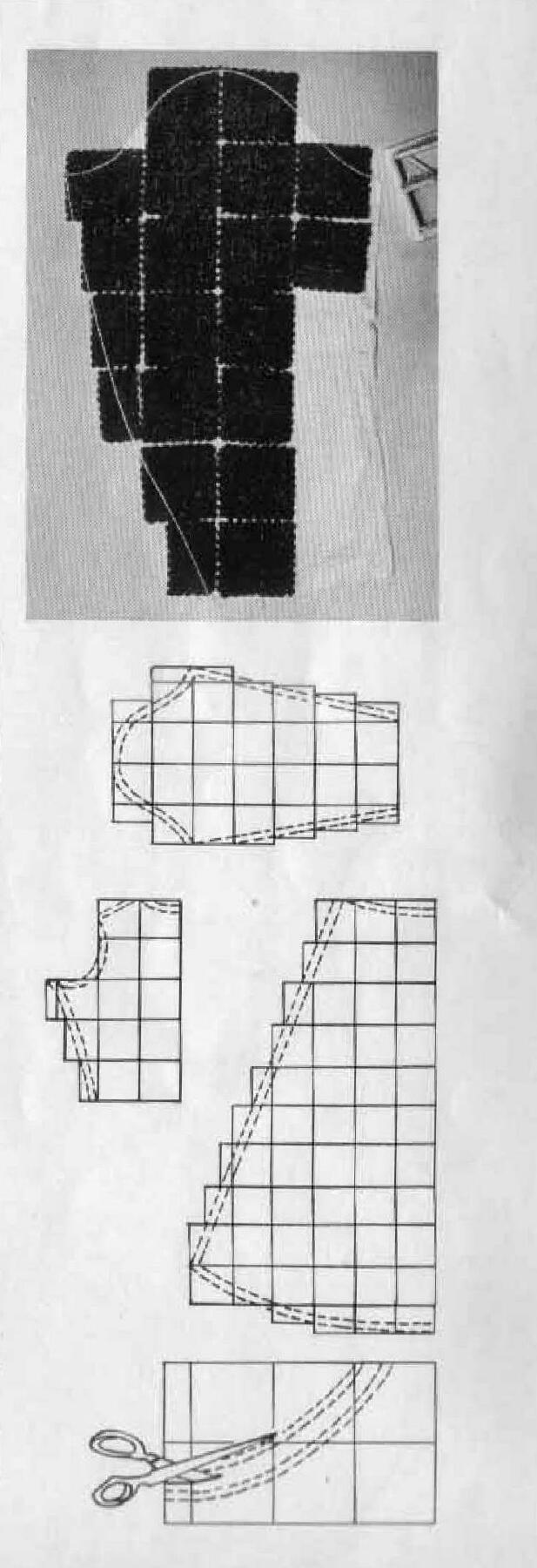
Cutting curved pattern-pieces

Many sewing patterns designed for pinweaving use rectangular construction, with all seams lying on selvage edges. This eliminates waste. Others use non-rectangular construction, cutting curve-edged pattern pieces out of a piece of cloth formed by sewing together the squares. Garments can be cut on the bias or on the grain with similar amounts of waste.

Seams joing the squares may be eased; that is, there are more squares on one side of the join than on the other. The extra length is distributed evenly along the seam, creating fullness without discrete pleats.

== Similar methods ==
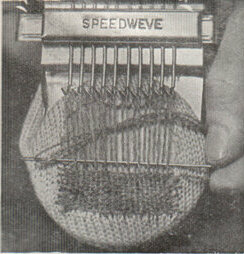
Darning loom with a shedding mechanism.

Darning looms are similar to pin weaving, but instead of being wrapped around pins, three of the selvages are stitched into the cloth being repaired. The fourth is wrapped around a revolving-hood mechanism which, when rotated, forms a shed and countershed, making plain tabby weaves much faster. When finished, the hooks are removed, and the fourth selvage is usually stitched to the cloth.

== Publications ==
=== Early twentieth-century ===
- Original Loomette Weaves, Revised edition with improved joining method described, by Loomette Studios. Public-domain fulltext.
- The Loomette Handbook; New weaves, vogues, and suggestions, by Loomette Studios. Public-domain fulltext.
- See Commons:Category:Pin-weaving publications for more public-domain books
- See also eLoomaNation for more free fulltexts

=== 21st-century ===
- Stump, Margaret (2002). Weavies One. PO Box 255, Buffalo Lake, Minnesota, 55314, self-published.
- Spencer, Hazel (2003). Weaving On Hazel Rose Looms. Rt. 2, Box 4792, Trinity Center, California, 96091, self-published.
- Spencer, Hazel (2003). Quilt Weaver Looms.Rt. 2, Box 4792, Trinity Center, California, 96091, self-published.
- Matthiessen, Barbara (2008). Small loom & freeform weaving : five ways to weave. Minneapolis, MN: Creative Pub. International. p. 128. ISBN 978-1-58923-361-4.
- Trent, Jana (2009-06-11). "Triangle or Rectangle? [shawl pattern]". www.weavezine.com.
- Stump, Margaret (2014). Pin loom weaving : 40 projects for tiny hand looms (First ed.). Mechanicsburg, PA: Stackpole Books. ISBN 9780811712484.
- Correa, Florencia Campos (2015). 100 pin loom squares (First U.S. ed.). New York. ISBN 9781250059093.
- Stump, Margaret (2017). Pin loom weaving to go : 30 projects for portable weaving (First ed.). Guilford, Connecticut: Stackpole Books. ISBN 9780811716130.
- Stump, Margaret (2019). Adorable beasts : 30 pin loom animals + 4 playscapes. Lanham, MD: Stackpole Books. ISBN 9780811737753.
