= Merrow (disambiguation) =

Merrow is a creature in Irish mythology.

Merrow may also refer to

- Merrow, Surrey
- Merrow Sewing Machine Company, an American Manufacturer

== People ==
- Harry Merrow (born 1938), American politician
- Jane Merrow, British actress
- Jeff Merrow (born 1953), American football player
- John Merrow (born 1941), American broadcast journalist
- John William Merrow (1874–1927), American theater architect
- Joseph M. Merrow (1848–1947), American industrialist

== See also ==
- Mero (disambiguation)
