= Blanket stitch =

Stitch used to reinforce the edge of thick materials

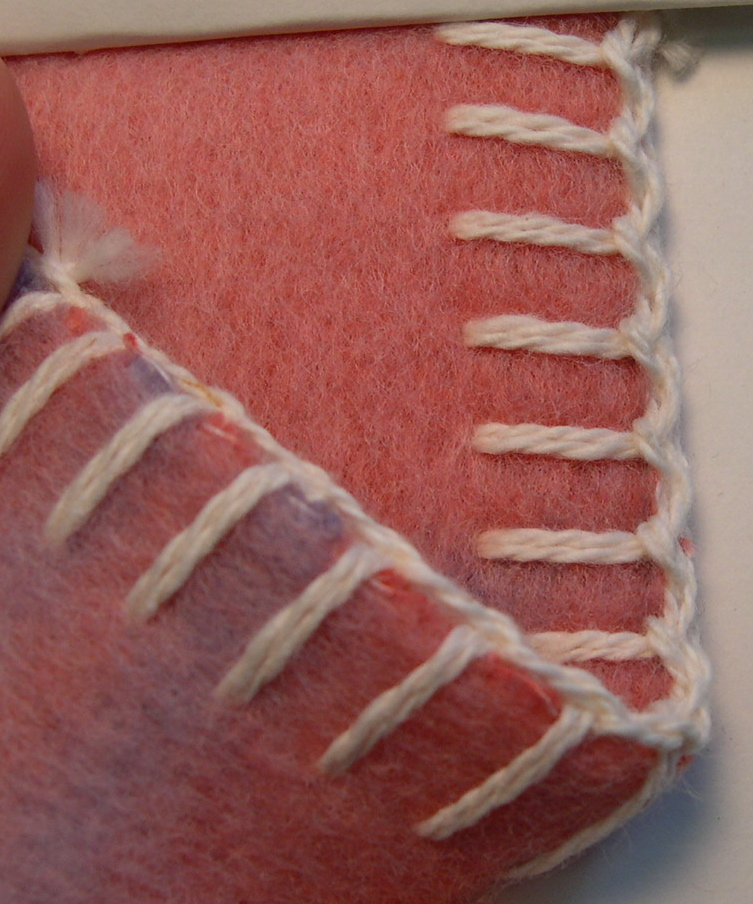
A Merrow blanket stitch

The blanket stitch is a stitch used to reinforce the edge of thick materials. Depending on circumstances, it may also be called a cable stitch or a crochet stitch. It is "a decorative stitch used to finish an unhemmed blanket. The stitch can be seen on both sides of the blanket."

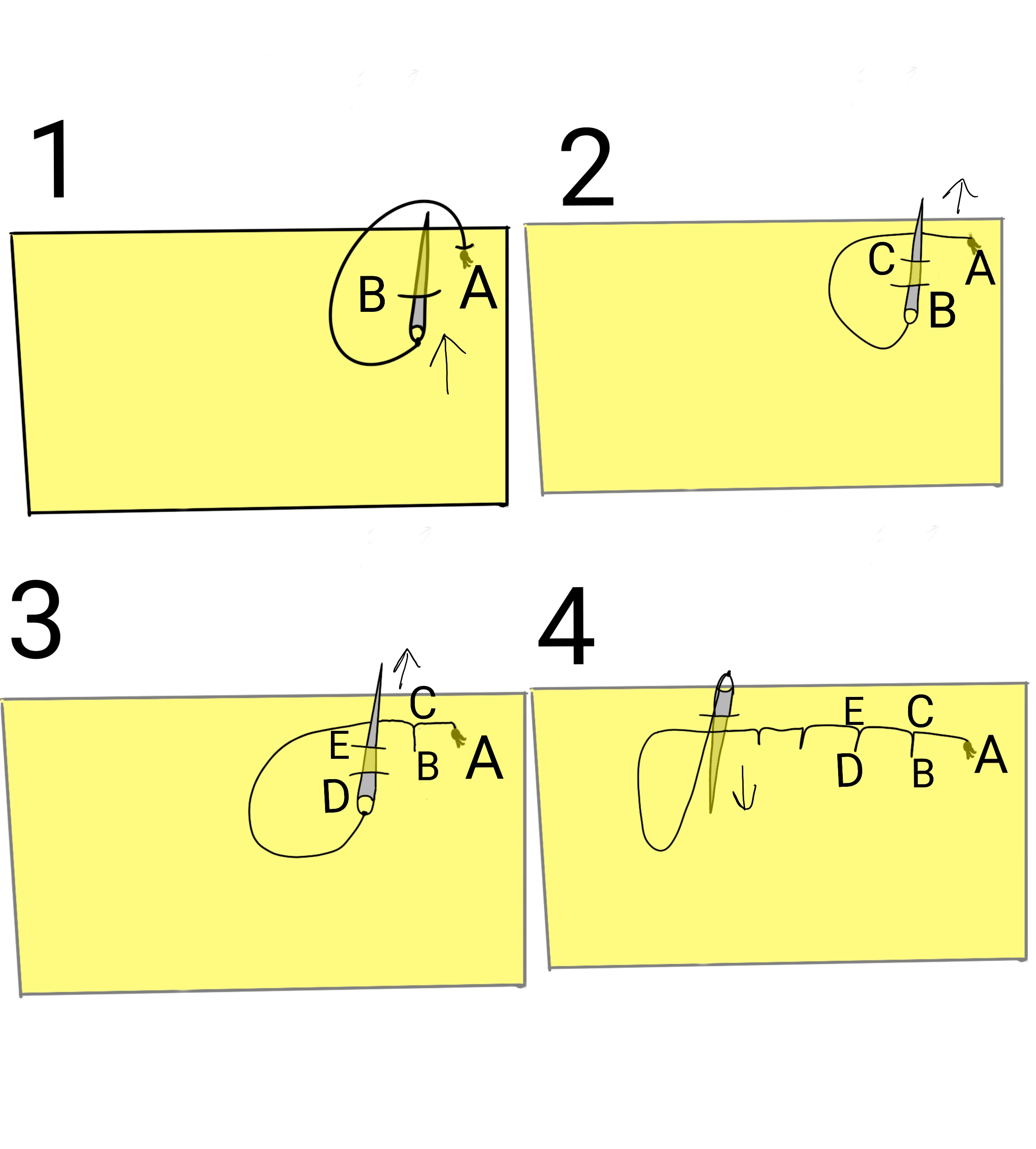
A simple diagram showing how to do a blanket stitch with lettering indicating which Step goes first, second, third, and so on.

== History ==
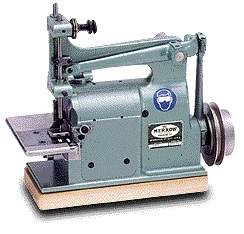
A Merrow industrial crochet machine

This stitch has long been both an application by hand and as a machine sewn stitch. When done by hand, it is sometimes considered a crochet stitch, used to join pieces together to make a blanket or other larger item. It is used in sewing leather pieces together, as traditionally done by indigenous American cultures, and even for weaving basket rims. The whipstitch is also a type of surgical suturing stitch.

When done by machine, it may be called a whip stitch or, sometimes, a Merrow Crochet Stitch, after the first sewing machine that was used to sew a blanket stitch. This machine was produced and patented by the Merrow Machine Company in 1877. The defining characteristic of the crochet machine is its ability to sew with yarn and stitch thick goods with a consistent overlock edge. From 1877 to 1925 the machine evolved dramatically, and consequently so did the capacity of manufacturers to produce goods with the whip stitch.

== Style ==
The blanket stitch is commonly used as a decorative stitch on an array of garments. Besides blankets, it is used on sweaters, outerwear, swimsuits, home furnishings, pillows, and much more. There are many styles of production blanket stitching, including rolled, narrow, with elastic, and traditional (see photos below).

Additionally, the term "blanket stitch" has become a verb, describing the application of the stitch.

Traditional	Narrow	Rolled	Whipstitch

== See also ==
- Whip stitch
- Overcast stitch
- List of sewing stitches
