= Penny rug =

Decoration made of coin-shaped fabric scraps

Wool penny rug

A penny rug is a decoration made of stitched-together coin-shaped fabric scraps.

== History ==
Penny rugs are believed to date back to at least the 1700s but became popular in the 1800s, starting around the time of the Civil War. Thrifty homemakers would use scraps of wool or felted wool from old clothing, blankets and hats to create designs for mats or rugs. Using coins as templates—the origin of the name "penny rugs"—the weavers created circles, and each piece was then stitched in blanket stitch fashion. The mats or rugs were sometimes backed with old burlap bags or feed sacks. Sometimes a penny was stitched inside the mat to make it lie flat.

Not all penny rugs were meant to cover the floor. Many were meant as hearth rugs, with darker colors to disguise dirt and burn marks. Others were used as decorative coverings for beds, tables and dressers and mantels. Sometimes they are used as wall hangings or pillows. Most designs include circles and some include images from everyday life such as cats, flowers, birds and shapes such as stars and hearts.

Penny rugs were repopularized in the 2000s as crafts.
