= Merrow Sewing Machine Company =

American sewing machine manufacturer

- Type: Private
- Industry: Textiles
- Founded: 1838
- Headquarters: Fall River, Massachusetts, USA
- Key people: Charlie Merrow, Chairman & CEO; Owen Merrow, President
- Products: Overlock sewing machines; Crochet sewing machines; End-to-end seaming machines; Sewing machine parts; Sewing machine needles
- Number of employees: ~25 (2010)
- Website: http://www.merrow.com

The Merrow Sewing Machine Company, best known for inventing the overlock sewing machine, is a manufacturer of sewing machines. After the explosion of his gunpowder mill in 1837, in 1838 J.M. Merrow built a knitting mill on the same site. The company developed crocheting machines for its own use and by 1887 evolved to design, build and market sewing machines exclusively. During its early decades it was organized as a partnership under various names: established in 1838 as Joseph M. Merrow & Sons by J. Makens Merrow, then Pitkin, Merrow, & Co., renamed Merrow Manufacturing Co. in 1857, then Merrow and Millard in 1863, J.B. Merrow and Sons in 1870, and incorporated as The Merrow Manufacturing Company in 1893. Originally all of its manufacturing was done at facilities in Merrow, Connecticut, and then in Hartford, Connecticut, after 1894. The company is currently based in Fall River, Massachusetts.

== History ==
=== From gunpowder to knitting mills ===
In the early 19th century, Mr. Joseph Makens Merrow became interested in the manufacture of gunpowder and purchased a powder mill 24 miles from Hartford, Connecticut. After the Mill was destroyed by explosion, in 1837, it was decided to build a knitting factory on the same site using water power from an adjacent river.

At first, the knitted goods were made largely of native wool which was sorted, scoured and dyed, picked, carded and spun into yarn and knitted into hosiery. Later, cotton goods were knitted. The products were sold through commission merchants in New York and delivered to retail stores throughout New England by two-horse wagons. Following the gold rush of 1849 shipments of goods began to sail to San Francisco. As business increased, a small machine shop was started to support the equipment in the factory.

=== The first overlock machine ===
In conjunction with the knitting business, the first crochet machines were constructed for finishing around the tops of men's socks in place of handwork. The Merrow machine as it is now known, was an invention of Mr. Joseph M. Merrow, who was president of the company until his death in 1947 at age 98.

The Merrow Machines were constructed under his direction prior to 1876 with numerous patents granted. The machines were so useful that business was undertaken to introduce the equipment to other textile manufacturers. In 1887 the knitting mill was destroyed by fire and the company moved to Hartford and reorganized concentrating on the manufacture of overlock sewing machines.

=== The Merrow Machine Company ===
In Hartford the company focused on building lines of industrial overlock sewing machines that were used to overedge fabric, add decorative edging and support the fabric processing trade by joining fabrics.

Between 1893 (when the company was renamed the Merrow Machine Company) and 1932 (when a line of "A Class" machines was introduced), Merrow had a significant impact on the textile industry. The technology and rate of innovation in this time, spearheaded by Joseph M. Merrow was unequaled in the industry. As a consequence there were several high-profile legal confrontations, including Merrow v. Wilcox & Gibbs in 1897.

Sales for overlock sewing machines were strong and Merrow grew to employ more than 500 people in Hartford, Connecticut. The company also excelled developing international distribution and by 1905 had agents in 35 countries and printed manuals in at least 12 languages.

In 1955, Merrow patented the Merrow MG-3U Emblem Machine.

In the mid-1960s Merrow opened a manufacturing facility in Lavonia GA to reduce costs and maintain proximity to an American textile market that was moving from New York City to the American South East.

In the 1990s, Merrow developed a new overlock machine called the Delta Class, but was never able to gain traction with the new model.

In 2004, shareholders of the Merrow Machine Co. agreed to a buyout of the company by Charlie Merrow, and it was renamed the Merrow Sewing Machine Company.

=== The Merrow Sewing Machine Company ===
After the reorganization in Massachusetts, the company released notice that it would continue supporting most models of sewing machines manufactured after 1925, and would re-release to market new versions of its most popular models.

The company has capitalized on the trademarks "merrowed" and "merrowing", working with manufacturers who use Merrow machines to brand and market "merrow" stitching.

In 2008, Merrow developed a social network for stitching named merrowing.com, and introduced series of rich media web based tools to help people research and understand the myriad of stitches produced by Merrow machines.

=== Present day ===
The Merrow Sewing Machine Company is now based in Fall River, Massachusetts, and is managed by Charlie Merrow and Owen Merrow, great-great-nephews of Joseph M. Merrow. The company continues to build many models of overlock sewing machines. In addition to being one of the most recognized brands of textile equipment in the world, it remains the oldest manufacturer of sewing machines still made in the United States.

=== Activeseam ===
In 2008, Merrow introduced the Activeseam stitch as a technical improvement to flatlock and coverstitching for technical apparel.

ActiveSeam is a branded stitch that Merrow markets as technically superior and more comfortable than flatlock. According to the company "for the first time in apparel, ActiveSeam creates a protected and marketable space around the seam of a garment or accessory with both aesthetic and technical advantages."

ActiveSeam is a family of stitches created on the newest platform of MB class machines from Merrow. An ActiveSeam may be: Minimal (disappearing in the garment), Slim (a narrow flat seam), Comfort (a wide flat seam), or Infused 3D (a three-thread variant that exposes a hidden color in the seam when it stretches).

== Timeline ==
- 1822: J. Makens Merrow purchases a powder mill in Mansfield, Connecticut for the manufacture of gunpowder. The mill is destroyed in 1830 by a gunpowder explosion.
- 1838: J. Makins Merrow founds the first knitting mill in America in partnership with his son, Joseph B. Merrow, under the name J. M. Merrow and Son. This knitting mill is located on the site of the old gunpowder mill in Mansfield, Connecticut.
- 1840s: A machine shop is established at the Merrow mill to develop specialized machinery for the knitting operations.
- 1877: The world's first crochet machine is invented and patented by Joseph M. Merrow, then-president of the company.
- 1892: A need for expansion leads Merrow to rebuild its plant in Hartford, Connecticut.
- 1894–1947: Over 100 patents are issued in the Merrow name, most notably for the first shell-stitching machine and the first butt-seaming machine.
- 1964: Merrow expands operations in the South by opening Franklin Industries, a wholly owned subsidiary, in Lavonia, Georgia.
- 1972: Merrow acquires the Arrow Tool Company of Wethersfield, Connecticut, a machining subcontractor.
- 1982: Merrow moves its location from Hartford to Newington, Connecticut.
- 2004: Charlie Merrow and Owen Merrow great-grandsons of Lena Bryant (and great nephews to Joseph B. Merrow) with their father Robert Merrow, organize a buyout of the Merrow Machine Company and move its headquarters to Wareham, Massachusetts, changing its name to The Merrow Sewing Machine Company.
- 2005: Merrow announces it will continue production of all major lines of sewing machines.
- 2008: Merrow develops and releases a dozen web based tools including video, interactive application & stitch finders, the social network for stitching named merrowing.com, a "needle configurator" and a new online store
- 2010: After moving to Fall River, MA into the historic Granite Mill Buildings, Merrow opens the only Sample Room for industrial sewing machines in the US, and adds custom built industrial sewing machines to its standard product line.
- 2012 Introduces Activeseam
- 2020: Retools to manufacture facemasks and PPE for clinical uses.

== See also ==
- List of sewing machine brands

== Historical documents about Merrow® Sewing Machine Company ==
- Obituary of J. M. Merrow in The Hartford Daily Courant, March 28, 1947
- "Company History", a letter from the company's Treasurer, dated May 22, 1958, pg. 1
- "Company History", a letter from the company's Treasurer, dated May 22, 1958, pg. 2
- "News from Merrow", December 1972
- "The Merrow Machine Company - A Connecticut History and Tradition", from 1982 or later
- Newspaper article (partial) with picture, from 1987 or later
- "UPDATE from the Merrow Machine Company", November 1988, pg. 1
- "UPDATE from the Merrow Machine Company", November 1988, pg. 2
- "UPDATE from the Merrow Machine Company", November 1988, pg. 3
- "UPDATE from the Merrow Machine Company", November 1988, pg. 4
