= Ladder stitch =

Invisible seam closing stitch

Ladder stitch

A ladder stitch, or mattress stitch, is a stitch which can be used to invisibly close seams from the outside of the garment or item. It is primarily used to close seams on stuffed items, such as pillows, mattresses, down coats or stuffed toys, where, after the stuffing is added, there is no access to the back of the fabric. It can also be used to repair split seams on these items or garments, or to alter clothing.

== Surgical suturing ==
Running subcuticular suture

Ladder stitching can also be used in surgery sutures to close an incision in the skin. In this context it is called a running subcuticular suture or running subcuticular closure.
