= Coverstitch =

Kind of stitch

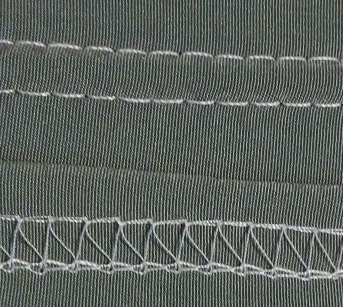
Two sides of a coverstitch

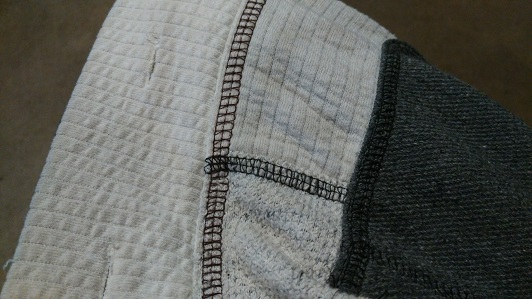
The looper side of a coverstitch used decoratively on a garment

A coverstitch is formed by two or more needles which add straight stitches to one side of the fabric and a looper thread on the opposite side of the fabric that zig-zags between the straight stitches. A coverstitch results in parallel lines of straight stitches on one side of the fabric and an overcast stitch on the reverse side. It is widely used in garment construction, particularly for attaching trims and flat seaming where the raw edges can be finished in the same operation as forming the seam.

== Uses ==
Unlike the overlock stitch which is sewn over the edge of the fabric, the coverstitch can be formed anywhere on the fabric. The coverstitch is useful for necklines and hems, particularly in knits as the stitch will stretch. When the straight stitches are on the visible side of the garment, the looper thread on the reverse hide the raw edges of the fabric. On some garments, the coverstitch is used with the looper thread on the visible side of the garment for emphasis or decoration.

A twin needle on a regular sewing machine can be used to imitate a coverstitch by sewing parallel straight stitches on the top side and a zigzag stitch on the reverse.

== Standards ==
The distance between the needles determines the distance between the lines of straight stitches. Home machines generally offer a narrow setting of 2.5 or 3.5 mm, and a wide setting of 5 mm. Some of the newest home machines permit a 4-thread coverstitch which results in three lines of parallel straight stitches.

The International Organization for Standardization classifies stitch types in ISO 4915:1991. ISO 406 describes a two-needle coverstitch and ISO 407 a three-needle coverstitch.

== Machines ==
Single-purpose coverstitch machines are used in industry sewing. In the 1990s, the functionality to perform a coverstitch was added to some home sergers. Most major sewing machine brands also offer stand-alone coverstitch machines for home sewing.
