= Stoating =

Type of stitching

Stoating, sometimes written stoting or stotting, is a type of stitching made to join two pieces of woven material, with raw edges placed together, such that the resulting stitches are not visible from the right side of the cloth. Stoating is accomplished by passing the needle only halfway through the pieces of material to be stoated, using a very fine needle and thread, such as silk, or even hair. Stitches would be drawn from side to side across the opening to be sewn closed, in a pattern resembling a zig-zag or the rungs of a ladder. Stoating may be used on heavier fabrics, such as felt and some types of tweed, or fabrics that will not fray easily. Stoating would also be used in place of seaming on heavy furs. When completed, the join should lie flat and not be visible from the right side of the fabric.
