= Joseph M. Merrow =

- Born: June 24, 1848; Merrow, Mansfield, Connecticut, United States
- Died: March 27, 1947 (aged 98); Hartford, Connecticut
- Occupation(s): President, Merrow Sewing Machine Company
- Predecessor: J. B. Merrow
- Successor: J. M. Washburn
- Parent(s): J. B. Merrow and Harriet Millard Merrow

Joseph Millard Merrow (June 24, 1848 – March 27, 1947) was an American businessman who was the president of the Merrow Machine Company.

== Early life and education ==
Merrow was born in the community of Merrow, town of Mansfield in Connecticut. His parents were J. B. Merrow and Harriet Millard Merrow. He was educated at the Munson Mass Academy and Hartford Public High School.

At the age of 15 he was employed as a pharmacist and a postmaster, appointed by Abraham Lincoln.

== Career ==
Established in 1838, the family business was the manufacture of knit cotton goods; it was the first of its kind in the country. In 1888 the family's mills were destroyed by fire related to an incident with gunpowder. His father, J. B. Merrow held a patent on gunpowder. The destruction of the mill allowed the company to further develop a small shop that had previously supported the knitting mill, and the Merrow Mills thus became primarily a manufacturer of crochet sewing machines.

Joseph Merrow was the driving force behind Merrow developing new technology, growing the new business and transforming it from a regional supplier of crochet sewing machines, to the market leader manufacturing hundreds of models of industrial overlock sewing machines. Under his leadership the company achieved a place of prominence in the industrial machine field with sales worldwide, hundreds of patents and the industries first industrial overlock sewing machine.

== Other interests ==
Merrow was also active in politics. In 1880 he was elected to the House of Representatives of the General Assembly. He was founder and president of the Hartford County Manufacturers association. In addition he founded the Industrial Memorials Inc, a business group that devoted its time to commemorating pioneer manufacturers by funding and locating plaques and statues. He was president from 1939 until 1946.

Merrow traveled the world, taking several dozen trips to Europe and Asia, while studying the industrial conditions of the countries he visited.

He was a writer and a poet. The Hartford Courant writing his obituary quotes him as having defined war as the 'history of the human race in a single word, Greed the cause of war and brotherly love the cure for greed and the end of war'.

Merrow never married, although his great nephews Owen and Charlie Merrow maintain his legacy as the current managers of the Merrow Sewing Machine Company.

== See also ==
- Merrow Sewing Machine Company

Preceded by J. B. Merrow	Chairman & CEO of Merrow Sewing Machine Company; 1868 – 1947	Succeeded by J. M. Washburn
