= Tack (sewing) =

Fastening with quick, temporary stitching

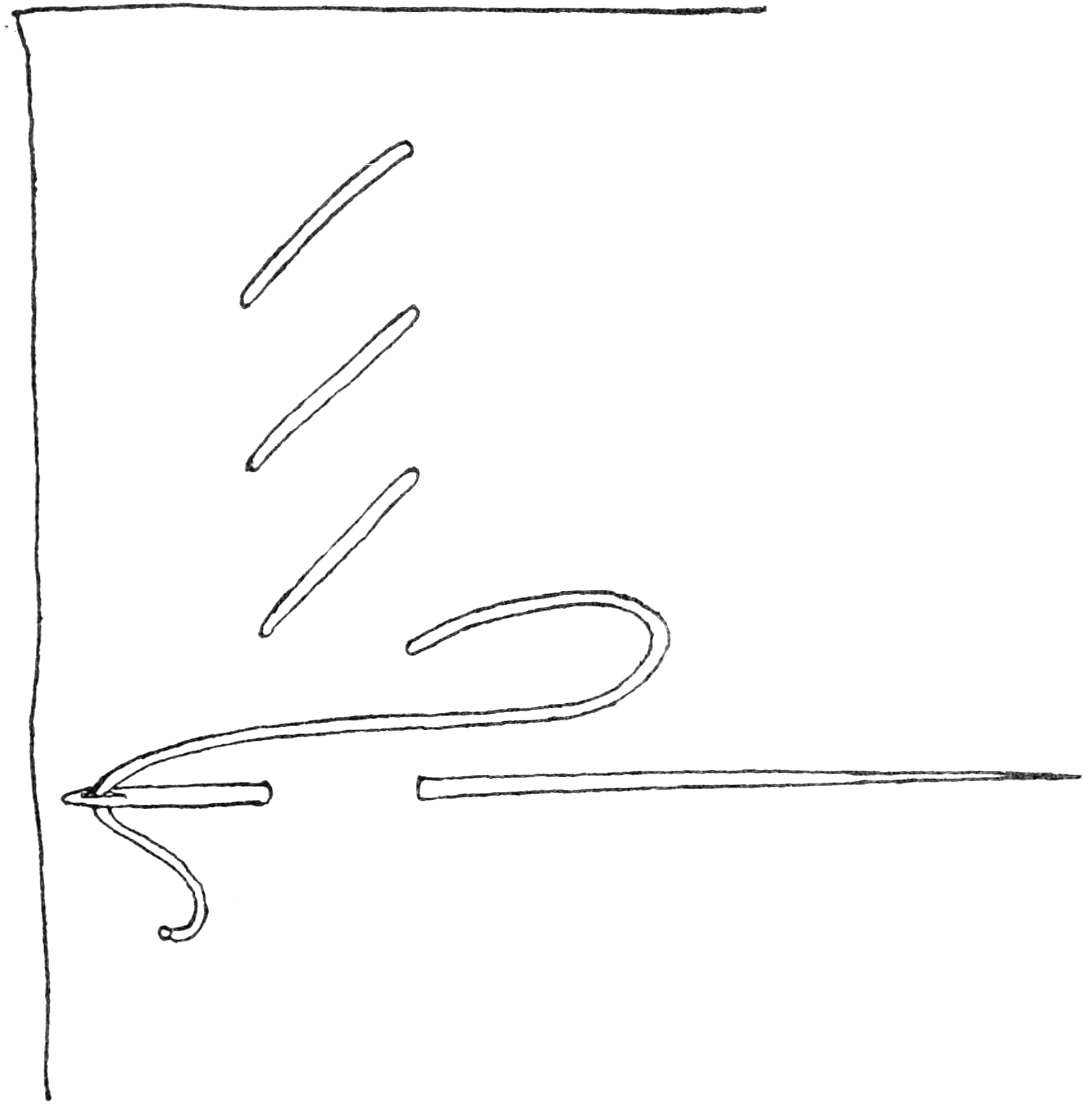
Diagonal bastings

In sewing, to tack or baste is to sew quick, temporary stitches that will later be removed. Tacking is used for a variety of reasons, such as holding a seam in place until it is sewn properly, or transferring pattern markings onto the garment. Tacking is typically sewn using a specialised tacking thread, which may snap easily in order for it to be easily removed from the garment when necessary.

== Uses ==
Tacking is used in a variety of ways; one of the most common uses is to easily hold a seam or trim in place until it can be permanently sewn, usually with a long running stitch made by hand or machine. This is called a 'tacking stitch' or 'basting stitch'. Tacking stitches may be used when a garment is being fitted to a model during production, as the stitches can be easily removed and replaced with pins if the seam requires alteration.

X-shaped tacking stitches are also very common on the vents (slits) of the back of a man's suit jacket, or at the bottom of kick pleats on a woman's skirt. They are meant to hold the flaps in place during shipping and when on display in the store. They should be removed before being worn. Brand labels are also loosely basted on the outer edges of the sleeves of outfits as well as women's winter coats, intended to be removed after purchase. They are meant to help customers to easily identify the brands in the store without reaching into the collar.

Tacking may be used to temporarily attach a lace collar, ruffles, or other trims to clothing so that the attached article may be removed easily for cleaning, or to be worn with a different garment. For this purpose, tacking stitches are sewn by hand in such a way that they are almost invisible from the outside of the garment.

Tacking may be used to transfer pattern markings to fabric, or to otherwise mark the point where two pieces of fabric are to be joined. A special loose loop stitch used for this purpose is called a 'tack' or 'tailor's tack'. This is often done through two opposing layers of the same fabric so that when the threads are snipped between the layers the stitches will be in exactly the same places for both layers thus saving time having to chalk and tack the other layer.

A basting stitch - an overlong straight stitch with unfinished ends - is often used in quilting or embroidery to temporarily hold sandwiched pieces of fabric in place, with the basting stitches removed when the piece is finished.

== Gallery ==
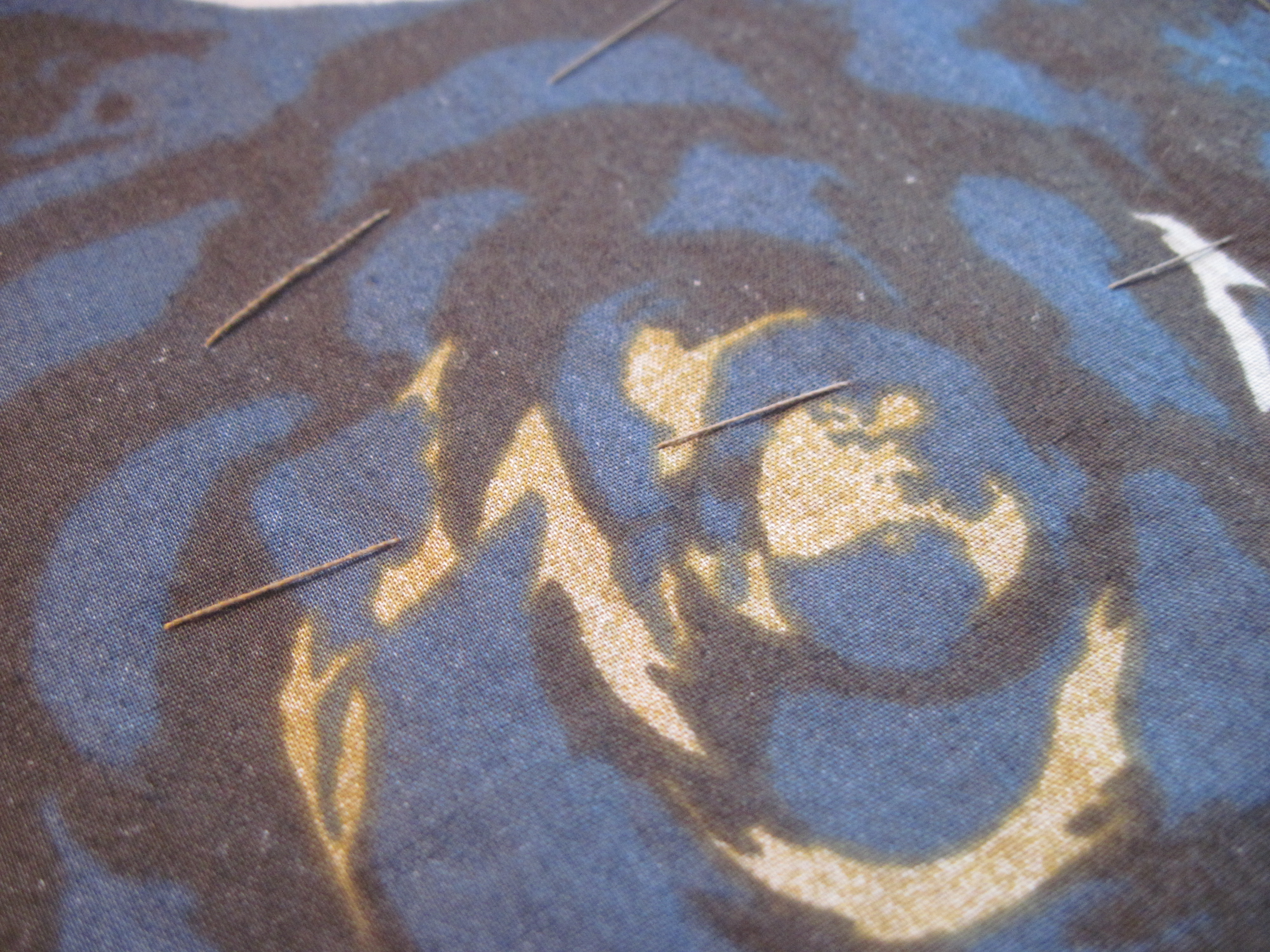
Basting thread on the right side (outer side) of fabric.

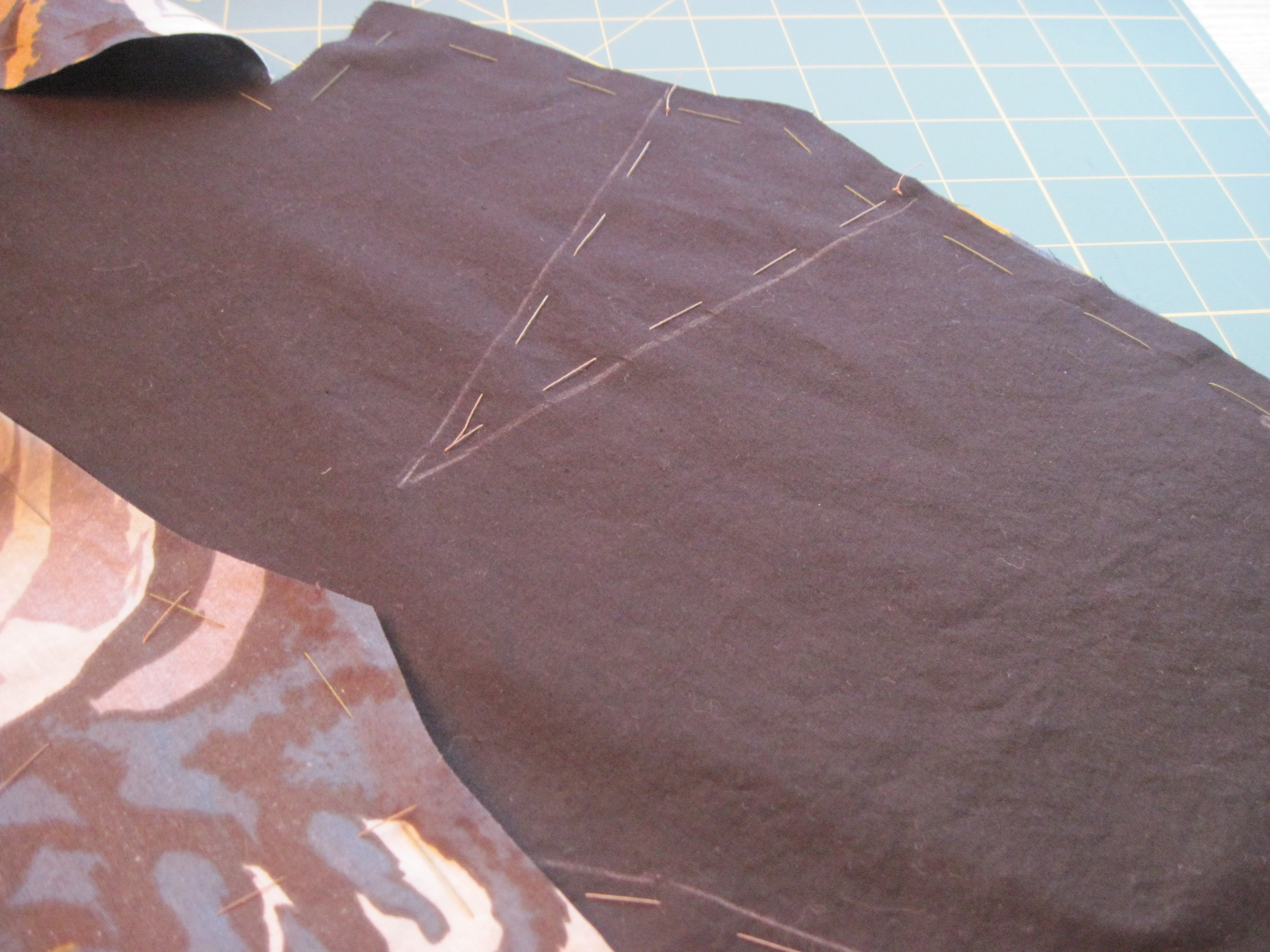
Tracing paper from a pattern is basted to fabric before a piece is cut. The basting marks are outlined with tailor's chalk.

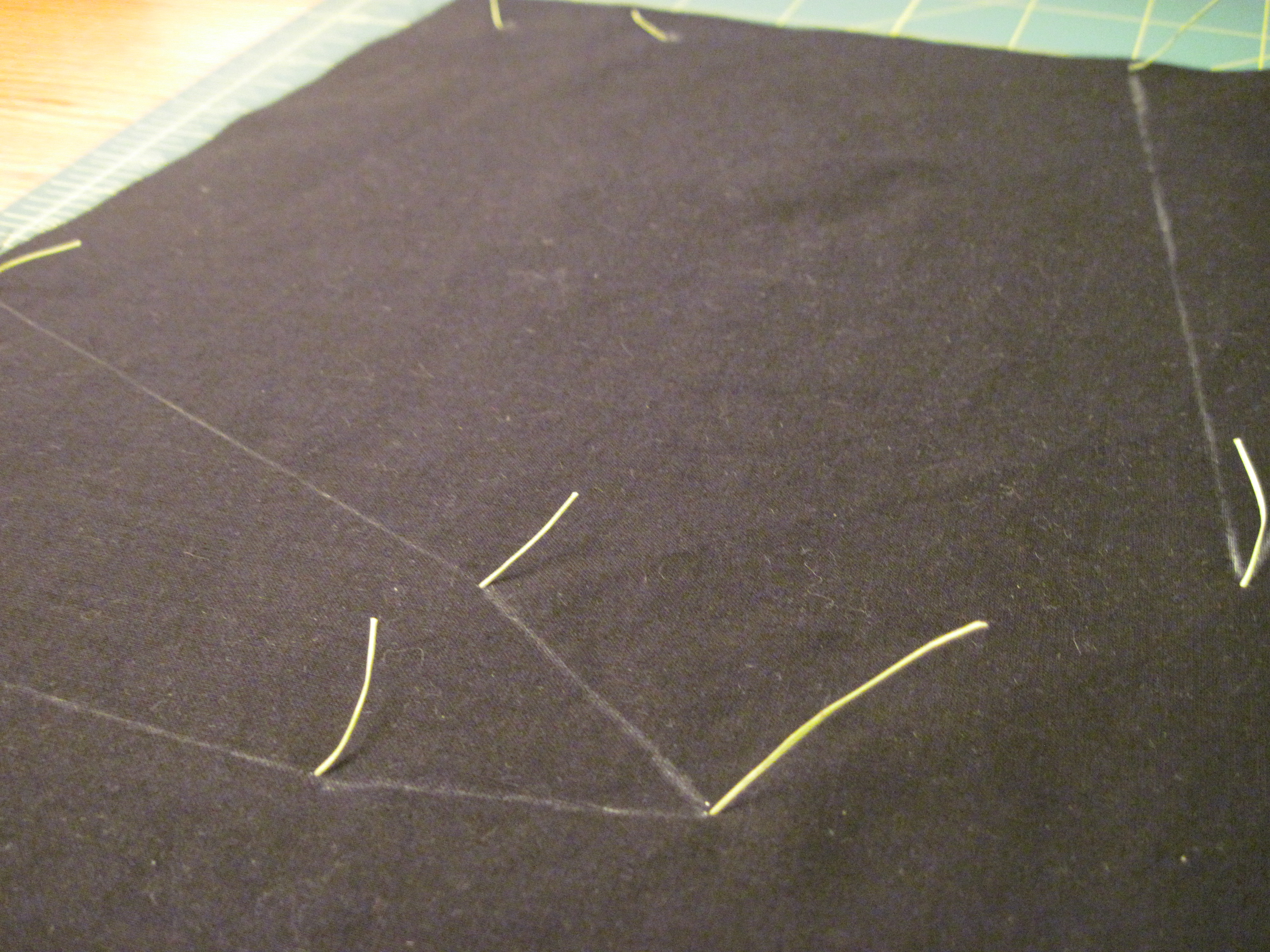
Tailor's tacks mark fabric to trace a pattern piece, without attaching tracing paper.

== See also ==
- Bar tack
