= Whip stitch =

Sewing stitch

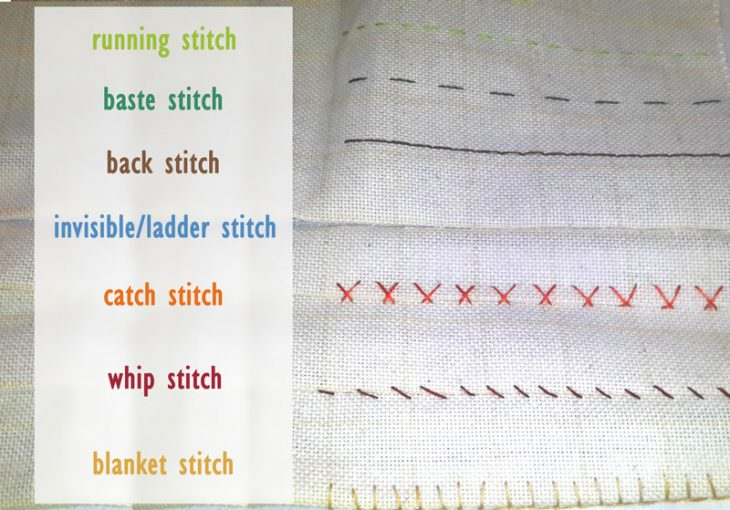
whip stitch compared with the most common sewing stitches

A whip stitch is a simple sewing stitch that is used in crocheting, knitting and sewing, in which the needle is passed in and out of the fabric in a series of stitches that circle an edge of the fabric. In hand sewing, this stitch can be used to create a seam but can also be used for joining two pieces together. Whip stitching creates a nice edge and prevents the fabric from unraveling.

It is similar to the blanket stitch as it is a form of hand sewing stitch that helps in finishing edges.

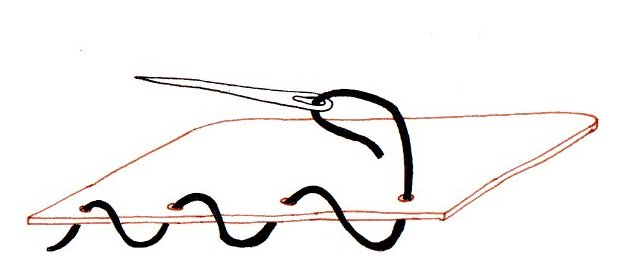
whip stitch

== Other uses ==
The whip stitch is often used in applique making, closing the sides of pillows and cushions, hemming jeans, attaching crocheted amigurumi toys together as it produces a neat seam, and in leather lacing as a decorative stitch in leather garments and accessories.

== See also ==
- Blanket stitch
- Overcast stitch
- Sewing stitches
