= Featherstitch =

Embroidery stitching technique

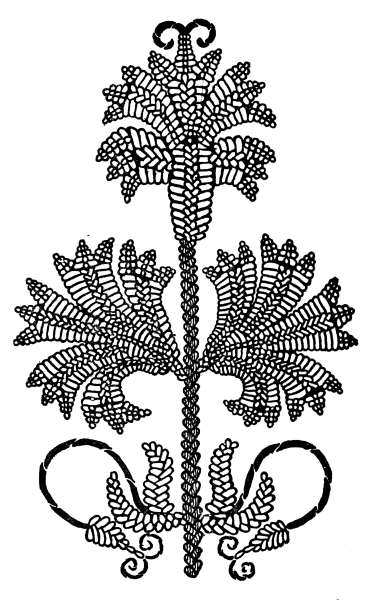
Drawing of Cretan embroidery in closed Cretan stitch from Embroidery and Tapestry Weaving, 1912

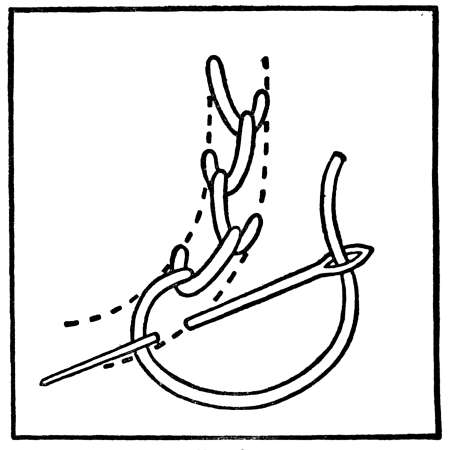
Featherstitch

Featherstitch or feather stitch and Cretan stitch or faggoting stitch are embroidery techniques made of open, looped stitches worked alternately to the right and left of a central rib. Fly stitch is categorized with the featherstitches.

== Applications ==
Feather stitch is a decorative stitch which is usually accompanied with embellishments. Cretan stitch is characteristic of embroidery of Crete and the surrounding regions.

Open Cretan stitch or faggoting is used in making open decorative seams and to attach insertions.

Feather stitch embroidery arose in England in the 19th century for decorating smock-frocks. It is also used to decorate the joins in crazy quilting. It is related to (and probably derives from) the older buttonhole stitch and chain stitch.

== Variants ==
Common variants of featherstitch include:

- Basic featherstitch
- Long-armed featherstitch
- Double featherstitch
- Closed featherstitch
- Chained feather stitch
- Cloud stitch

=== Stitch gallery ===
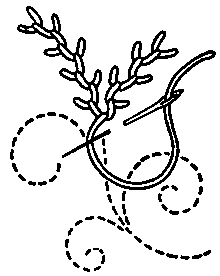
Featherstitch

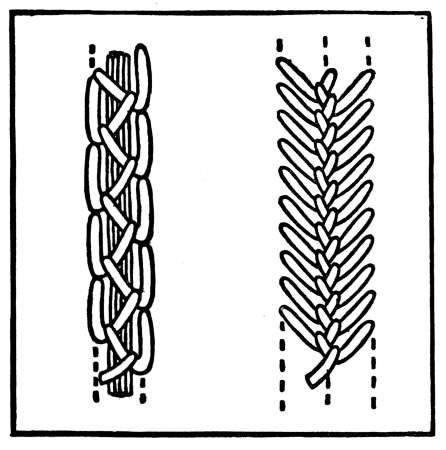
Closed featherstitch as a couching stitch, left, and long-armed featherstitch, right

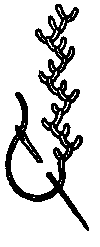
Double featherstitch

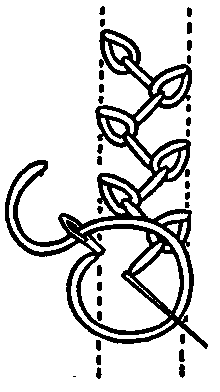
Chained featherstitch

== Looped stitches ==
Other looped stitches include:

- Cretan stitch or Open Cretan stitch or faggoting stitch
- Closed Cretan stitch
- Fishbone stitch
- Fly stitch, a filling stitch made of single, detached tacked loops.
- Loop stitch
- Scroll stitch

=== Gallery ===
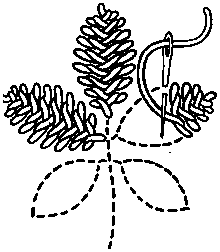
Cretan stitch

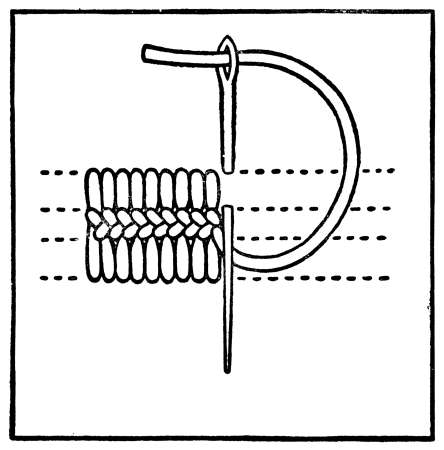
Closed Cretan stitch

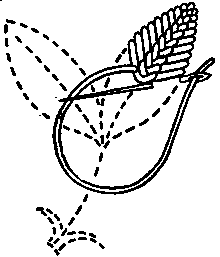
Closed Cretan stitch

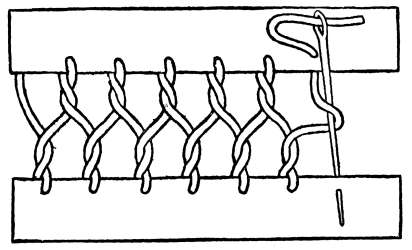
Faggotting with twisted Cretan stitch

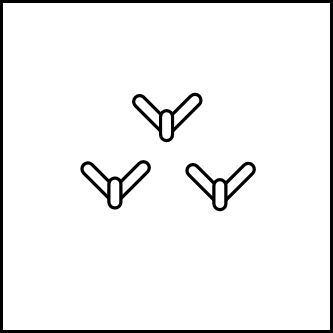
Fly stitch

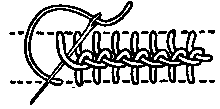
Loop stitch

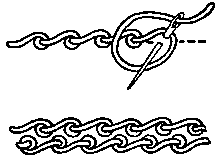
Scroll stitch

== See also ==
- Cross-stitch
- Embroidery stitch
