= Stitch (textile arts) =

Single turn or loop of yarn

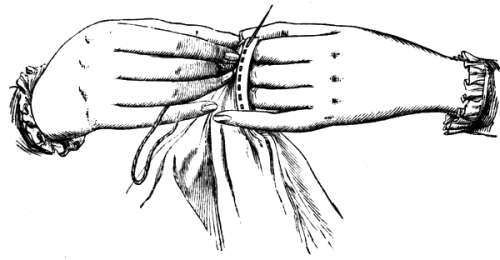
Hand-stitches

In the textile arts, a stitch is a single turn or loop of thread, or yarn. Stitches are the fundamental elements of sewing, knitting, embroidery, crochet, and needle lace-making, whether by hand or machine. A variety of stitches, each with one or more names, are used for specific purposes.

== Sewing, embroidery, and lace ==
Examples include:

- Backstitch
- Overcast stitch
- Cross stitch
- Buttonhole or blanket stitch
- Chain stitch
- Knot stitch

These stitches and their variations are named according to the position of the needle and direction of sewing (running stitch, backstitch), the form or shape of the stitch (chain stitch, feather stitch) or the purpose of the stitch (tailor's tack, hem stitch).

Sewing machine stitches are classified by their structure:

- Chain stitch, made with one thread
- Lockstitch, made with two threads
- Overlock, made with one to five threads
- Coverstitch, made with two or four threads (a twine)

More advanced machine stitches mimic traditional hand stitches using variations on the basic stitches. Many of these stitches though found centuries ago, are still used today.

== Knitting ==
In knitting, a stitch is a single loop of yarn, secured to the loops beside it to form a row or course of stitches and to the loops above and below it to form a wale.

In securing the previous stitch in a wale, the next stitch can pass through the previous loop either from below or above. If the former, the stitch is denoted as a knit stitch or a plain stitch; if the latter, as a purl stitch. The two stitches are related in that a knit stitch seen from one side of the fabric appears as a purl stitch on the other side.

== Crochet ==
In crochet, stitches are made by pulling a loop of thread through the work with a crochet hook. Crochet stitches are named based on their structure. In the English-speaking crochet world, basic stitches have different names that vary by country. The differences are usually referred to as UK/US or British/American.
