= Zigzag stitch =

Type of sewing stitch

A zig-zag

A zigzag stitch is variant geometry of the lockstitch. It is a back-and-forth stitch used where a straight stitch will not suffice, such as in reinforcing buttonholes, in stitching stretchable fabrics, and in temporarily joining two work pieces edge-to-edge.

When creating a zigzag stitch, the side to side motion of the sewing machine's needle is controlled by a cam. As the cam rotates, a fingerlike follower, connected to the needle bar, rides along the cam and tracks its indentations. As the follower moves in and out, the needle bar is moved from side to side. Sewing machines made before the mid-1950s mostly lack this hardware and so cannot natively produce a zigzag stitch. However there are often shank-driven attachments available which enable them to achieve a similar effect by moving the fabric from side to side instead of the needle bar.

Helen Blanchard is said to have invented and patented the first zigzag stitch sewing machine in 1873. Early domestic machines with built-in zigzag stitches for the home market include the Necchi BU, introduced in Italy in 1932, which the company claims was the first of its kind, and the Singer 206K, introduced in 1936.

== Zigzagger attachments ==
Older sewing machines designed to sew only a straight stitch can be adapted to sew a zigzag by means of an attachment. The attachment replaces the machine's presser foot with its own, and draws mechanical power from the machine's needle clamp (which requires the needle clamp to have a side-facing thumbscrew). It creates a zigzag by mechanically moving the fabric side to side as the machine runs.

The zigzagger's foot has longitudinal grooves on its underside, facing the material, which confer traction only sideways. This allows the zigzagger to move the material side to side while the machine's feed dogs are simultaneously moving the material forward or backward in the usual manner.

=== Singer zigzaggers ===
Singer produced a variety of "Singer Automatic Zigzagger" attachments over the years, including part numbers 160985 and 161102. These zigzaggers are equipped with pop-in cams (called "Stitch Patterns") for making four different zigzag stitches, as well as a bight control for choosing the zigzag width.

Four cams are included. There are also sets of additional different cams, four cams per set, sold as "Singer Stitch Patterns for Automatic Zigzagger". All cam sets are Singer part number 161008, and contain the following cams:

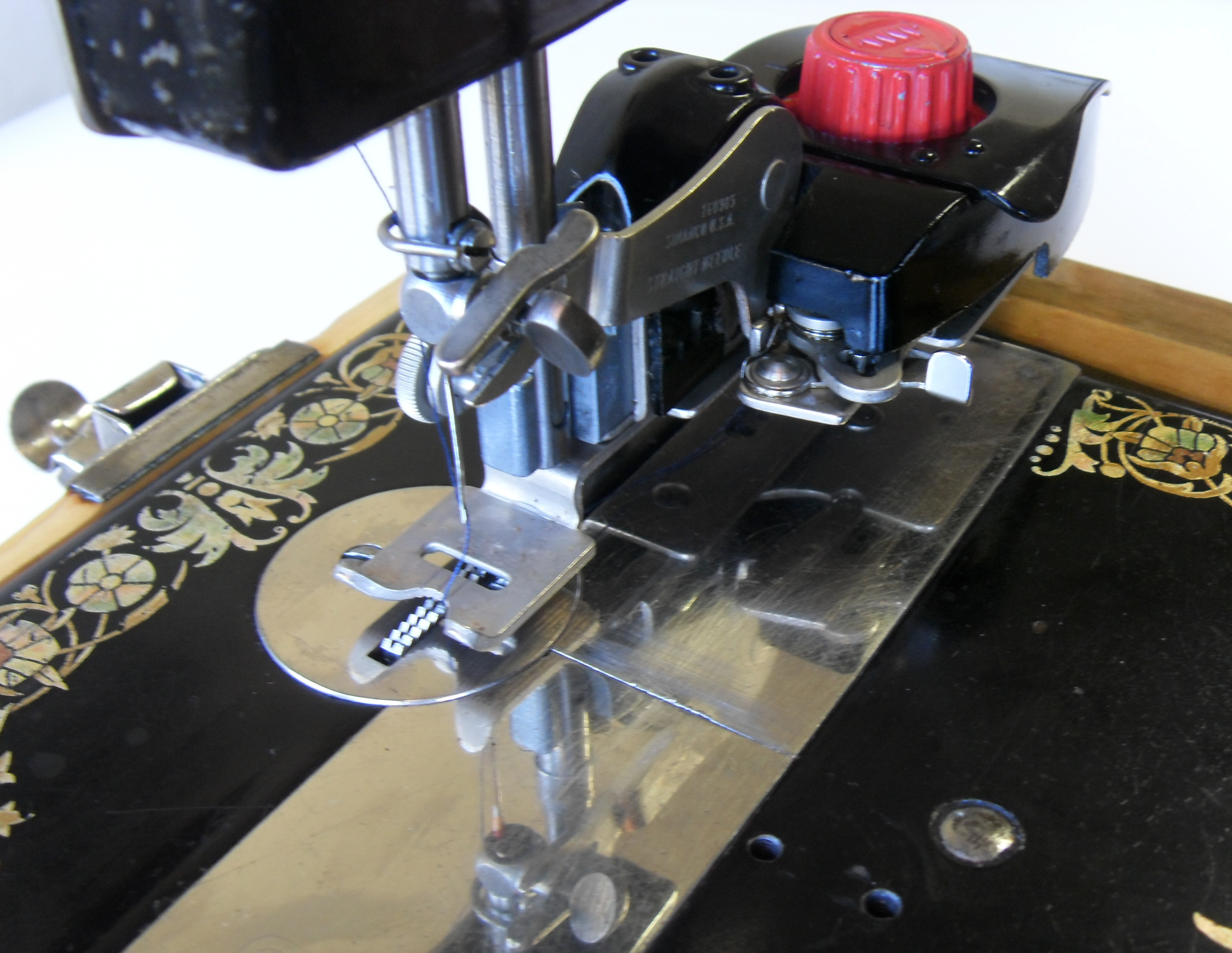
Singer model 160985 zigzagger

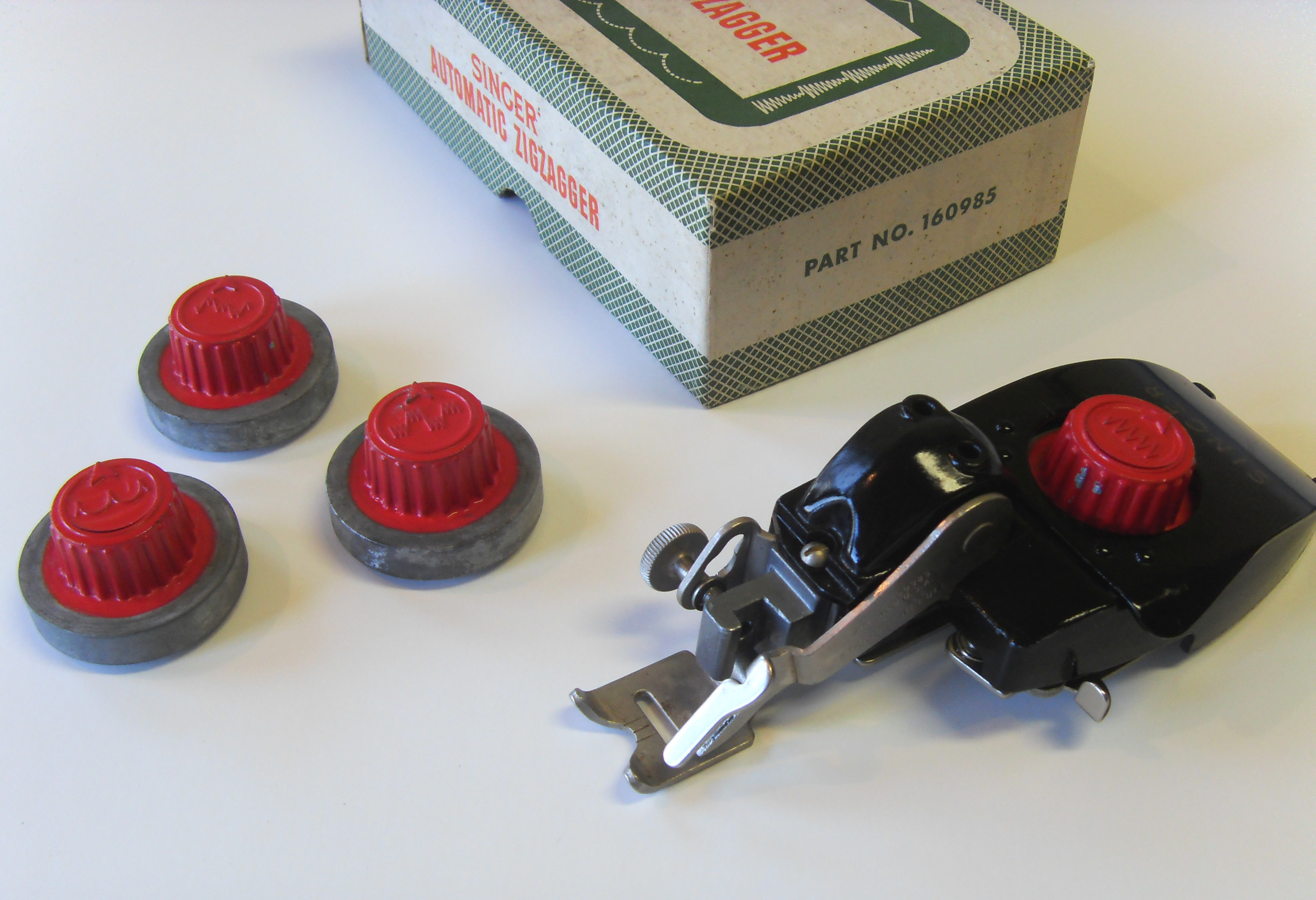
Singer model 160985 zigzagger kit

Set number	Cam part number	Pattern name
#1 red (included*)	161000	Zigzag
#1 red (included*)	161001	Blind Stitch
#1 red (included*)	161002	Domino Stitch
#1 red (included*)	161003	Arrowhead Stitch
#2 white**	161004	Scallops
#2 white**	161005	Multiple Stitch
#2 white**	161006	Walls of Troy
#2 white**	161007	Icicle
#3 blue	161067	Key
#3 blue	161068	Ball
#3 blue	161069	Block
#3 blue	161070	Shingle
#4 yellow	161071	Curved Mending
#4 yellow	161072	Open Scallop
#4 yellow	161073	Three Step
#4 yellow	161074	Solid Scallop

^{*} The #2 red set is included with the 160985 and 161102 zigzaggers.

^{**} Older #2 white sets have red-colored cams.

=== "YS Star" zigzagger ===
"YS Star" is a brand of Japanese sewing accessories that once included a zigzagger, model YS-7. Like the Singer zigzagger, it fits almost any low-shank sewing machine and draws mechanical power via an arm connected to the machine's needle clamp. Its stitch pattern is controlled by small flat rectangular metal templates, seven of which are included.

Two versions were made:

Version	Name	Body	Templates
Older	"Automatic Zig-Zager" [sic] on box, "Automatic Zigzager" [sic] on user manual	Red plastic over chromed metal	7 patterns on 7 single-ended templates
Newer	?	Green plastic over chromed metal	7 patterns on 3 double-ended and 1 single-ended templates

=== White zigzagger ===
The White Sewing Machine Company produced a zigzag attachment like the others. It was called the "White Zigzag Attachment", part number 1640. Rather than using cams or templates, it is much simpler, offering just a single control for adjusting the bight (zigzag width).

=== Sailrite Ultrafeed LSZ-1 ===
In 2000, Sailrite Enterprises, Inc. produced the Sailrite Ultrafeed LSZ-1, a portable zigzag stitch machine for sailmaking. It was created after observing other similar machines such as the Thompson Mini Walker and the Consew 146RB.

== Blind stitch ==
A blind stitch is a variant geometry of the zigzag stitch. It is also called a "blind hem". It is composed the same way as a zigzag, except that the individual zig-zag pairs are each separated by several straight stitches. Its purpose is to create a nearly invisible hem: because only the zigzags penetrate to the visible side of the material, minimizing their number minimizes their visibility.

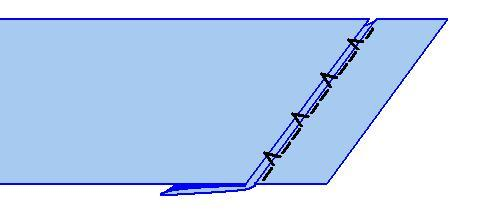
Blind stitch variant of the zigzag stitch
