= Overcast stitch =

Type of sewing stitch

Overcast stitch is a type of stitch used to enclose a raw, or unfinished, seam or edge. The purpose is to prevent unraveling of the fabric.

== Variations ==
The hand overcast stitch involves small, evenly spaced diagonal stitches, binding the raw edge of the fabric.

To create an overcast stitch with a sewing machine, an overcast foot or regular foot can be used. The overcast foot has an edge guide that helps the fabric to feed evenly along the edge and a bar in the middle that controls the stitch and makes it lay flat.

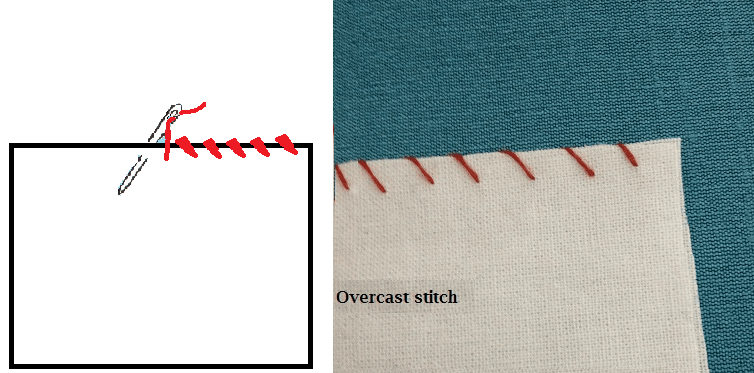
Hand Overcast stitch

== Applications ==
Overcast stitches may be reversible, as when they are used to join crochet block pieces of afghan blankets. There are several different kinds of overcast stitches. A straight overcast stitch is used for finishing edges in eyelets and cutwork. A blanket stitch, used to finish edges of wool blankets, is another common overcast stitch.

== Embroidery ==
In embroidery, an overcast stitch is a raised line stitch used on even-weave fabrics. It is commonly used for outlining designs. There are two methods of creating an embroidered overcast stitch. In one method, a line is stitched to create padding, then another thread covers the padding stitches in small stitches at right angles to the padding stitches. The other method is called detached overcast stitching, and involves two alternating padding stitches that pick up the fabric, followed by overcast stitches that cover the padding stitches without picking up the fabric.
