= White Peerless Sewing Machine =

White Peerless
- Type: Home
- Manufacturer: White Sewing Machine Company
- Material: Fabric
- Stitch: Lockstitch
- Power: Treadle, handcrank, add-on electric
- Feed: Drop
- Needle(s): One 15x1

The Peerless was a 3/4-sized version of the White Sewing Machine Company's vibrating shuttle-based sewing machine named the White Sewing Machine. It was developed at the end of the 19th century as a portable version of what was a very heavy machine. A later model called the "New Peerless" came into production at the end of the 1800s, featuring a bentwood case and a fold-back handcrank for easier storage.

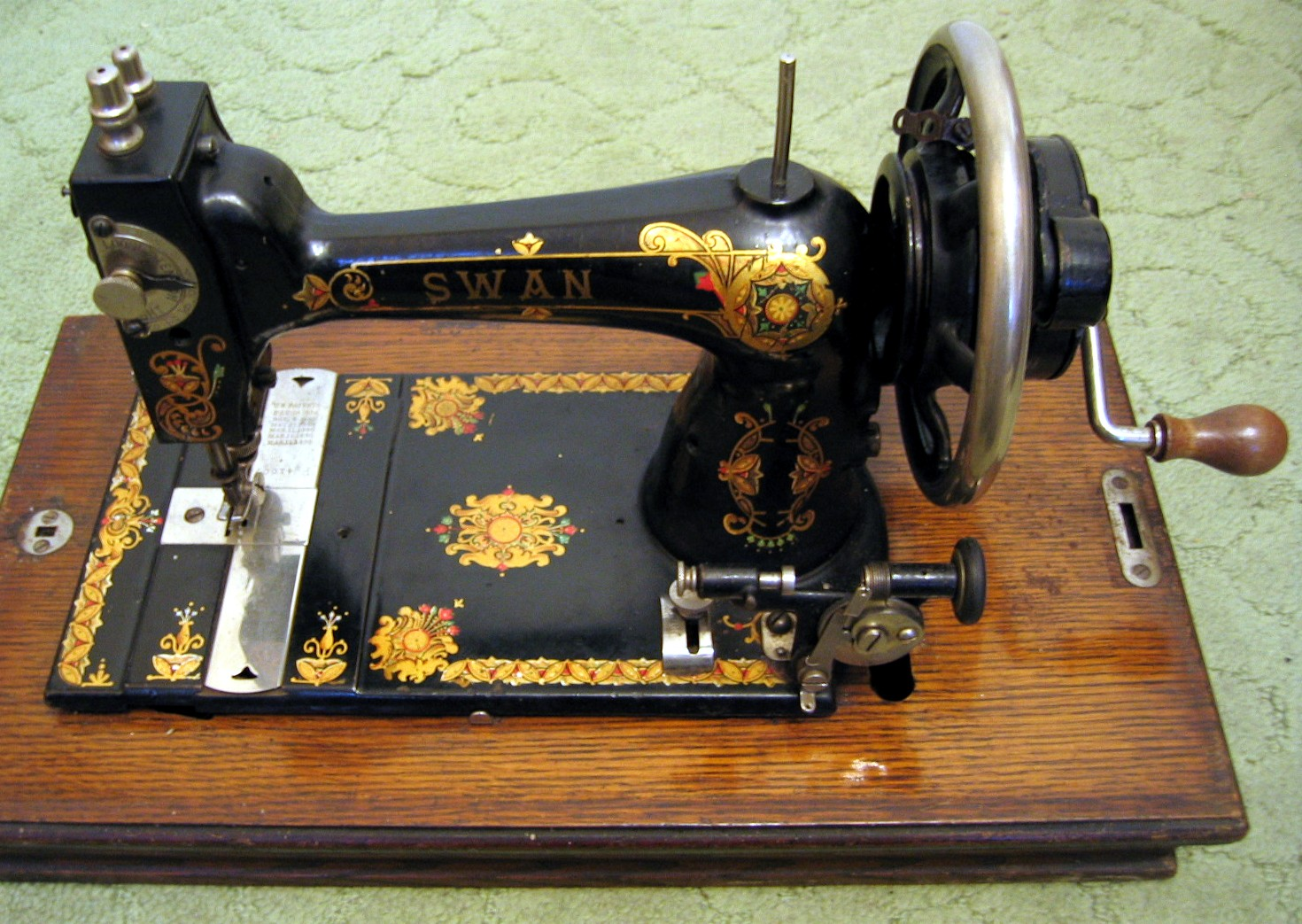
A White New Peerless badged with the name of "Swan".

== See also ==
- White Sewing Machine
