= Bobbin driver =

Throughout history, lockstitch sewing machines have used a variety of methods to drive their bobbins so as to create the lockstitch.

Names	Invented	Description	Picture	Notes
Transverse shuttle Longitudinal shuttle	1846 by Elias Howe Figure 5 from Howe's patent 4750, showing transverse shuttle 'K' in its race	Transverse shuttles carry the bobbin in a boat-shaped shuttle, and reciprocate the shuttle along a straight horizontal shaft. The design was popularized in Singer's 'New Family' machine. The design became obsolete once the other bobbin driver designs were developed.	Shuttle from a transverse shuttle bobbin driver	Sometimes incorrectly called an "oscillating shuttle". Somewhat confusingly, the term "Transverse Shuttle" is usually used only to refer to a side-to-side motion of the bobbin. When moved in a front-to-back motion, as in the Howe machines, and the earliest Singers, the term "Reciprocating Shuttle" is used instead.
Vibrating shuttle	1850 by Allen B. Wilson Figure 2 from Wilson's patent 7776, showing vibrating shuttle	Vibrating shuttle machines reciprocate their shuttle through a short arc. The earliest vibrating shuttles used boat-shaped shuttles, but bullet-shaped shuttles soon replaced them. The design was popularized in the White Sewing Machine Company's 'White Sewing Machine' and Singer's 27-series machines. Now obsolete.	Shuttle from a vibrating shuttle bobbin driver	Main article: Vibrating shuttle
Rotary hook Rotating hook Rotary loop taker Revolving hook	1851 by Allen B. Wilson Figures from Wilson's patent 9041, showing rotary hook and bobbin	Rotary hook machines hold their bobbin stationary, and continuously rotate the thread hook around it. The design was popularized in the White Sewing Machine Company's 'Family Rotary' sewing machine and Singer's models 95 and 115.	Hook from a rotary hook bobbin driver	Main article: Rotary hook
Oscillating shuttle	1877 by Lebbeus B. Miller and Philip Diehl Figure 10 from Miller/Diehl patent 208838, showing oscillating shuttle	Oscillating shuttle machines mount their bobbin on the hook, and reciprocate the hook through a short arc. The design was popularized in Singer's models 15 'Improved Family' and 31.	Shuttle and bobbin from an oscillating shuttle bobbin driver	
Oscillating hook	?	Oscillating hook machines hold their bobbin stationary, and reciprocate the hook through a short arc. The bobbin lies horizontally, right under the needle plate. The design was popularized in Singer's model 66.	Hook from an oscillating hook bobbin driver	

== "Rotating shuttle" ==
The term rotating shuttle is ambiguous. Sometimes it refers to a bobbin case, and sometimes it refers to a rotary hook design.
