= Vibrating shuttle =

Sewing machine component

A vibrating shuttle is a bobbin driver design used in home lockstitch sewing machines during the second half of the 19th century and the first half of the 20th century. It supplanted earlier transverse shuttle designs, but was itself supplanted by rotating shuttle designs.

== Overview ==
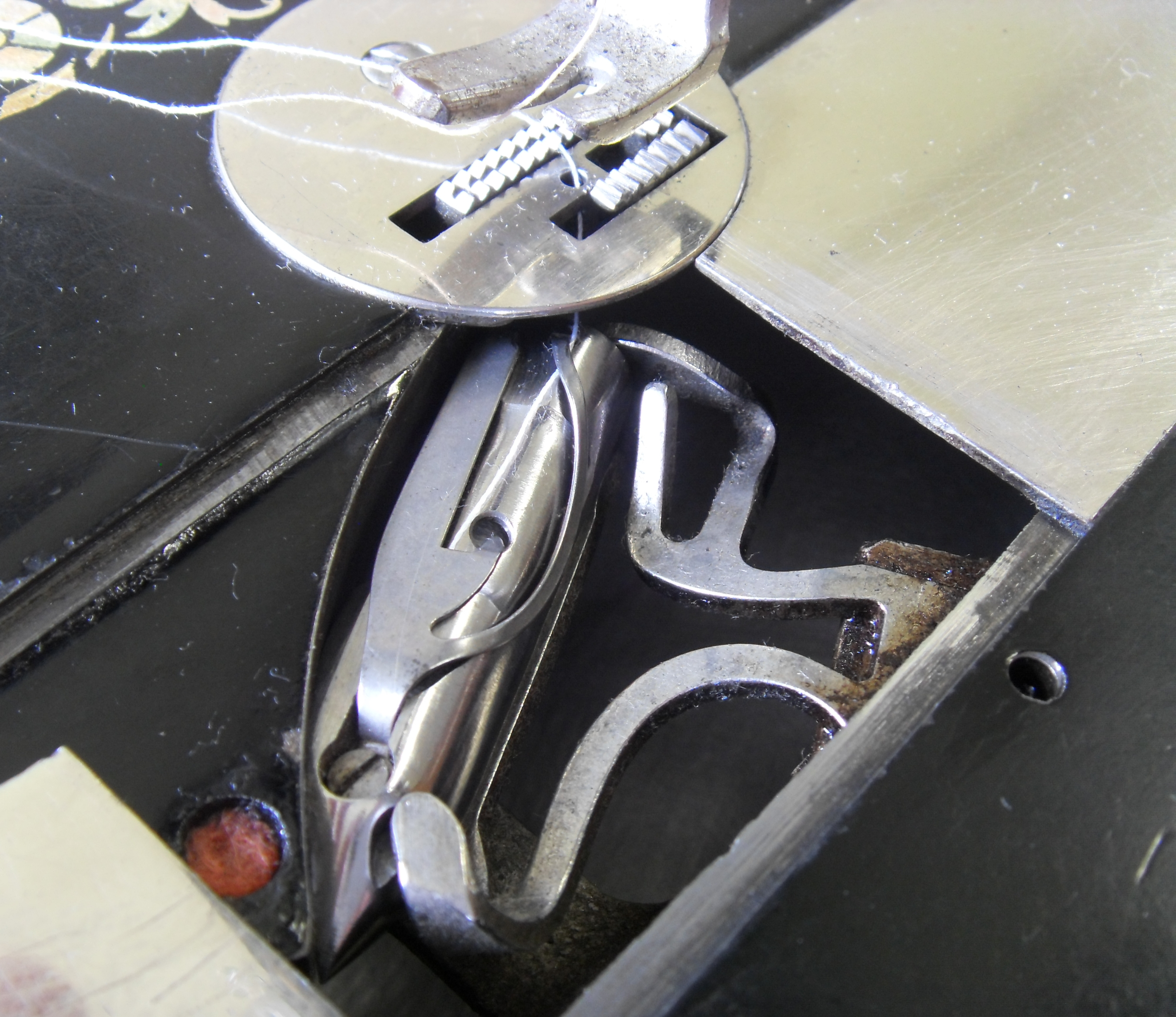
Vibrating shuttle in its carrier

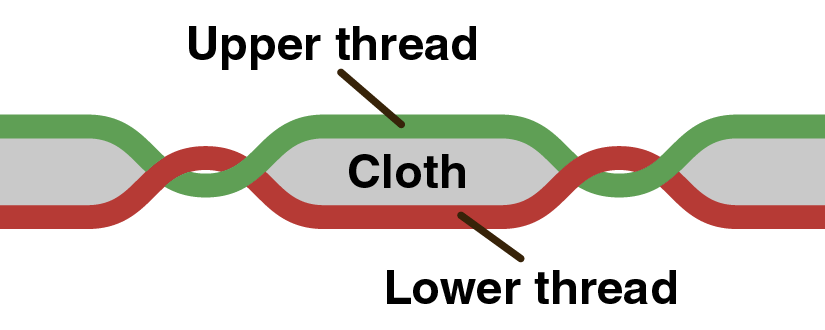

In order to create a lockstitch a sewing machine intertwines two threads: an upper thread (descending with the needle into the workpiece from above) and a lower thread (ascending into the workpiece from the bobbin below). To intertwine them, the machine must pass its shuttle (containing the bobbin and the lower thread) through a loop temporarily created from the upper thread.

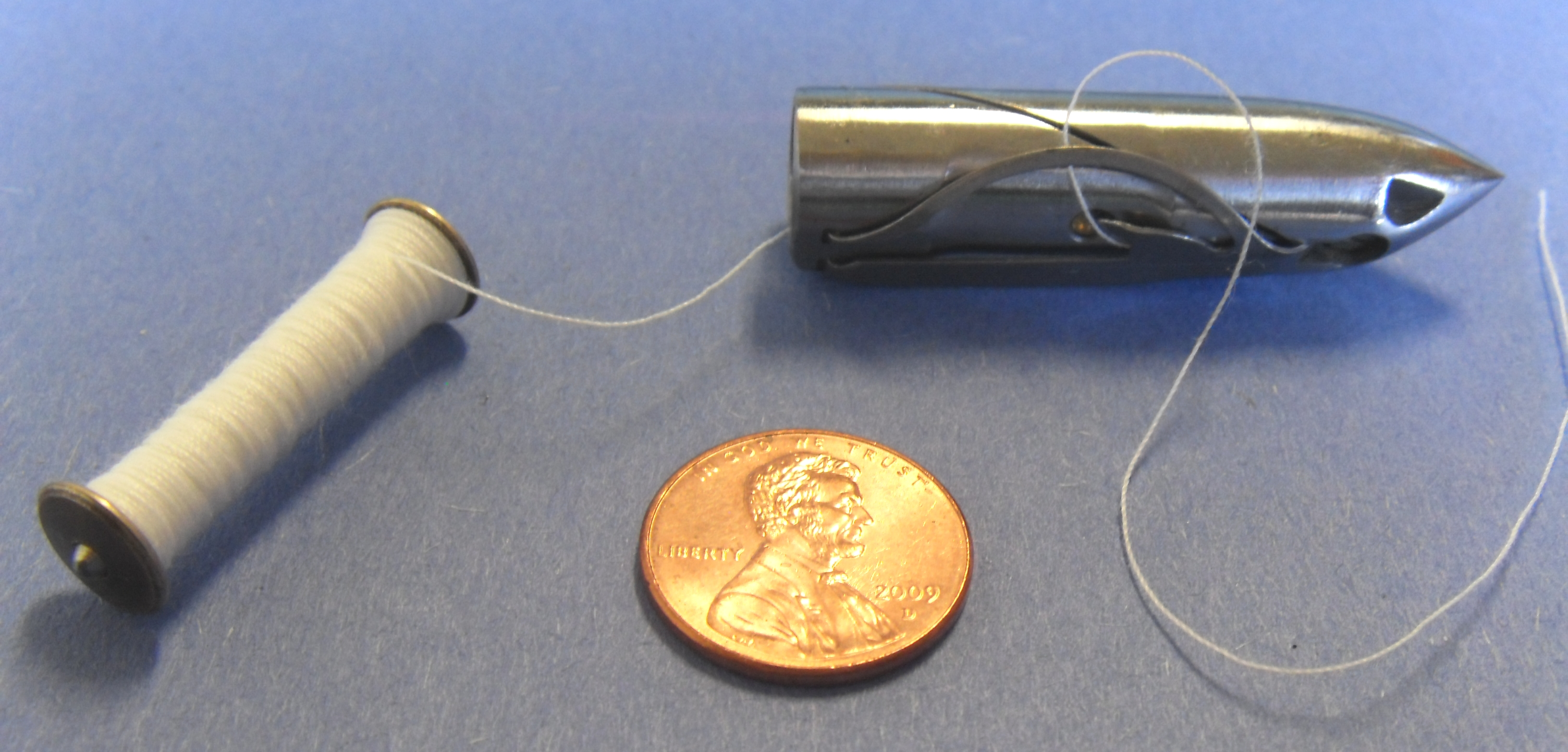
Singer bullet shuttle with bobbin exposed

Early sewing machines of the 19th century oscillate their shuttles back and forth on linear horizontal tracks—an arrangement called a "transverse shuttle". A vibrating shuttle machine, by contrast, 'vibrates' its shuttle in a circular arc. This movement represents less total mechanical motion, which means less friction, less wear, higher maximum speed, and higher reliability than in a transverse shuttle system.

Early vibrating shuttle designs inherited the boat-shaped shuttle used in transverse shuttle machines, where the bobbin is inserted from the open side of the "boat". In the 1880s, bullet shuttles became dominant. The bullet shuttle is long and slender, shaped like a bullet, with a pointed tip that is sometimes called the hook. The bobbin inserts from the rear, and the tip is pointed for the purpose of intercepting the small loop temporarily created (by a brief upward needle motion) in the upper thread—see pictures below of its operation. The bobbin too is long and slender to fit inside the shuttle; in this regard it is very different than the fat rotary bobbins of later sewing machines.

== History ==
The vibrating shuttle was used in machines made by dozens of manufacturers in the late 19th century, and improved upon by many engineers. What follows is a selection of some of the most influential examples.

=== Wilson ===
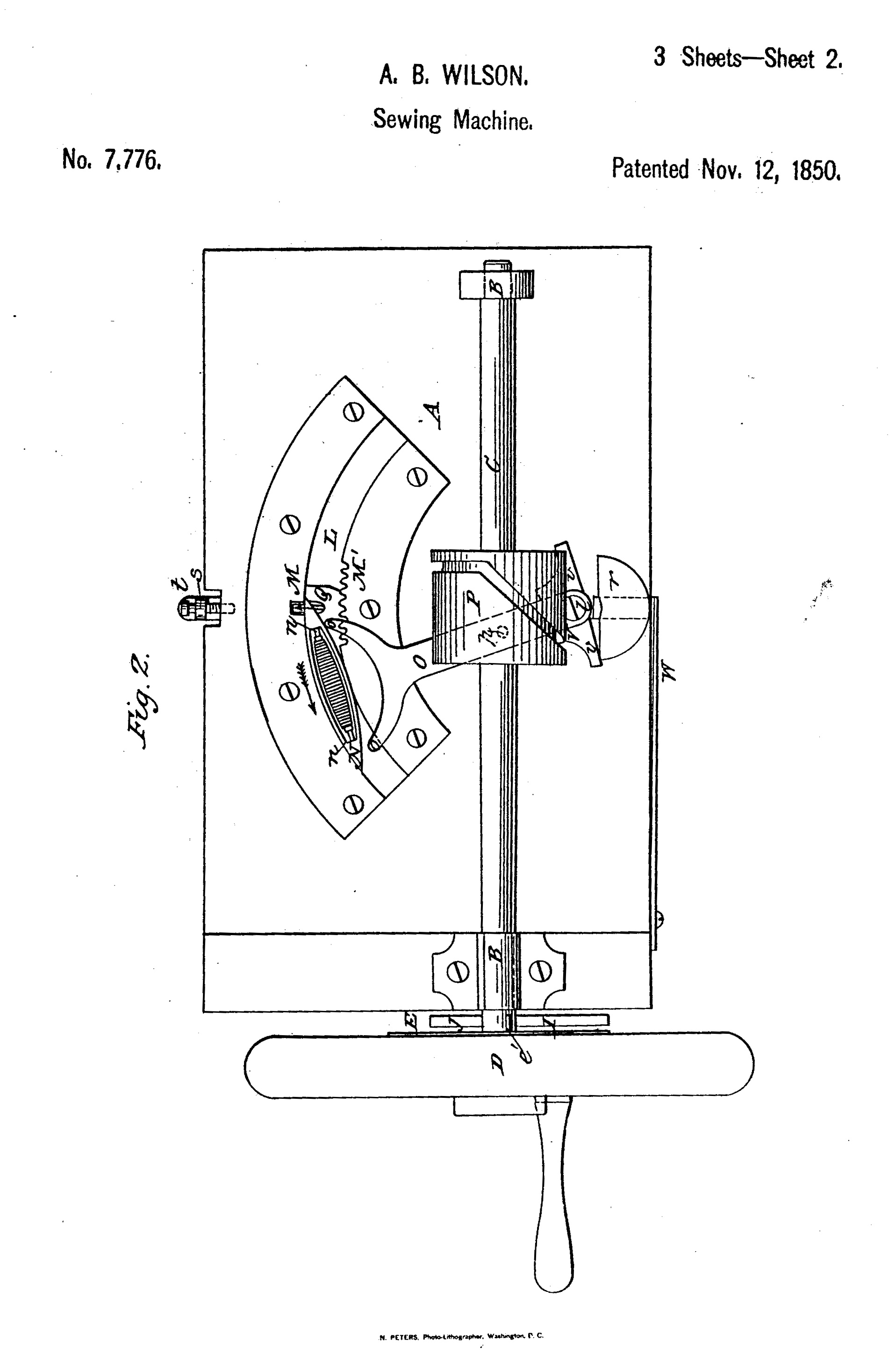
Page 2 from Wilson's patent 7776, showing the shuttle

The vibrating shuttle was invented by Allen B. Wilson in 1850, just one year before he would invent the rotary hook design that would eventually prevail over all other lockstitch bobbin driver designs. Wilson's original patent is US patent 7776, granted 12 November 1850, with reissues RE345 on 22 January 1856 and RE414 on 9 December 1856. The second page of his patent, showing the shuttle in its arc, is shown at left.

He was soon beset with patent litigation from the owners of the John Bradshaw patent:

"He was approached by the owners of the Bradshaw 1848 patent, who claimed control of the double-pointed shuttle. Although this claim was without justification, as can be seen by examining the Bradshaw patent specifications, Wilson did not have sufficient funds to fight the claim. In order to avoid a suit, he relinquished to A. P. Kline and Edward Lee, a one-half interest in his U.S. patent 7,776 […]"

His machine "had a considerable sale, but was not satisfactory to its inventor, who set himself to work to produce something more practical"—a new rotary hook design.

=== Stephen French ===
In 1868, Stephen French, working at the Gold Medal Sewing Machine Company in Orange, Massachusetts, patented an improved method of driving the vibrating arm. He used this mechanism in his designs of both the "Home Shuttle" sewing machine (from Johnson, Clark & Co., a related enterprise) and the Gold Medal "Home" sewing machine.

Underside of Gold Medal "Home", showing Stephen French's vibrator design

(The next model designed by Gold Medal, in 1878, was called the "New Home", and it proved so popular that the company was reincorporated as the New Home Sewing Machine Company in 1882.)

=== Porter and Baker ===
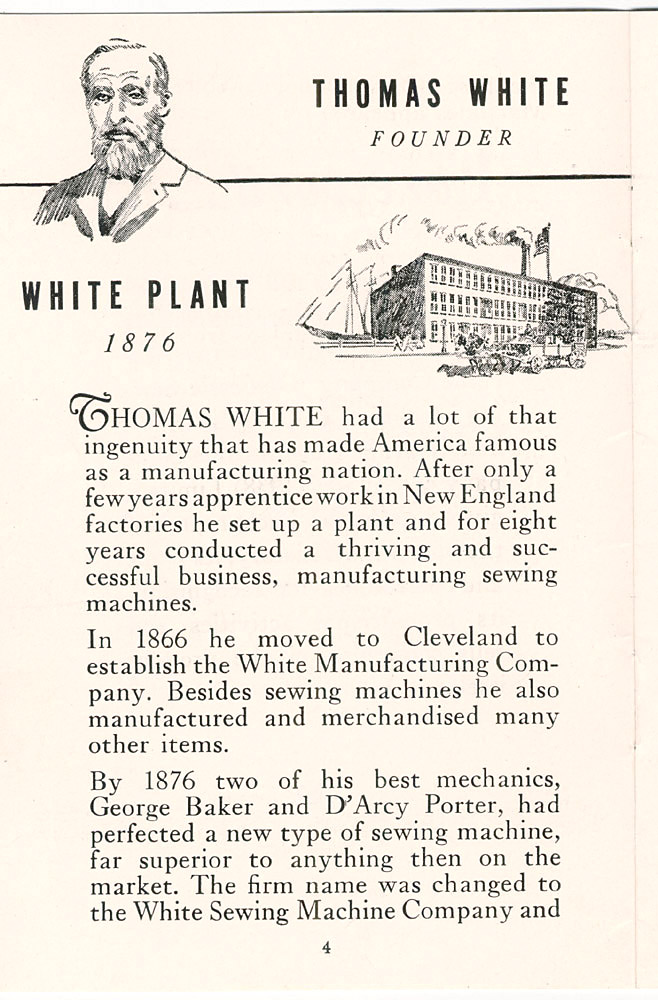
Page from White company literature

In 1876, the White Sewing Machine Company developed a machine around the vibrating shuttle which became the company's flagship product—so much so that it was originally named the "White Sewing Machine", only later taking the name "White Vibrating Shuttle" when a rotary hook model was added to the product line.

=== Whitehill ===
The vibrating shuttle's next development came in 1885, at the hands of Scottish immigrant Robert Whitehill. He designed a new machine around it which Singer bought and popularized.

The initial design of the Porter/Baker shuttle would change little throughout the 86 years that it would remain in production at White and then at Singer. This can be seen in the following shuttle-threading diagrams taken from the White and Singer instruction manuals:

White Sewing Machine	Singer Model 27 and 127

== Operation ==
The following photo gallery shows the vibrating shuttle cycling through a single stitch. In the pictures, the silver sliding covers have been opened to show the operation of the shuttle; normally they would be closed to prevent interference between the workpiece and the shuttle.

1	Shuttle is forward and beginning to move rearward. Needle is up and beginning to move downward.
2	Shuttle is midway and still moving rearward. Needle is down.
3	Shuttle is rearward and beginning to move forward again. Needle moves slightly upward to form a small loop in the upper thread at the needle's eye.
4	Shuttle is midway, and its point ('hook') has passed through the loop in the upper thread. Upper thread is now looped around the shuttle's waist. Needle is up.
5	Shuttle is forward again, having completely passed through the loop in the upper thread. Loop in upper thread is now being pulled straight (trapping the lower thread in a lockstitch) by the take-up arm. Needle is still up.

== Obsolescence ==
The vibrating shuttle was a significant innovation towards the goal of a simple, fast, and reliable lockstitch sewing machine, and the design remained popular for decades. Indeed, even twenty-five years later, on 10 October 1910, Singer was awarded US patent 1005177 for a new shuttle-ejector mechanism for it. (The improvement is one of those incorporated into the 'modernized' models 127 and 128 that replaced the 27 and 28.)

Later sewing machines abandoned such designs in favor of the faster rotary and/or hook-based designs.

Rotary and hook-based designs are superior because they do not cause their sewing machine to shake and 'walk' the way that vibrating and transverse shuttles do. Vibrating shuttle machines nevertheless remained in production until the 1960s.
