= White Sewing Machine =

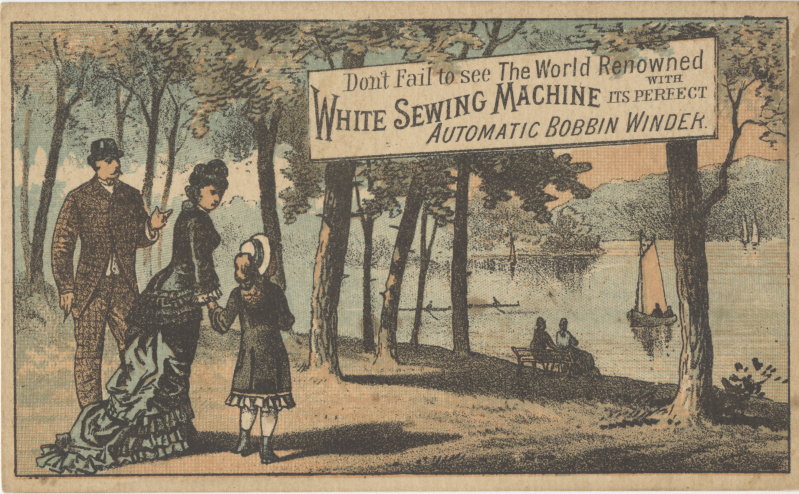
Trade card, ca 1900

The White Sewing Machine was the first sewing machine from the White Sewing Machine Company. It used a vibrating shuttle bobbin driver design. For that reason, and to differentiate it from the later White Family Rotary that used a rotary hook design instead, it came to be known as the "White Vibrating Shuttle" or "White VS". In 1879 it cost USD50 to US$125 (US$1097 to US$2744 adjusted) depending on which table or cabinet it was to be mounted in. The White VS continued in production, with improvements, until the early 1900s.

There was also a 3/4-sized version called the "White Peerless".

== Production ==
=== Versions ===
The White VS evolved over time through these versions:

Year	Model	Shuttle	Picture	Notes
1876–1882	Model A (VS I)	boat		round tension control on upper arm, manual bobbin winder
1882–1886	VS IIa	boat	?	round tension nut on lower head without dial
1886–1889	VS IIa	bullet	1886-1889 White VS IIa Treadle Sewing Machine. Upper tension knob has no dial.	round tension nut on lower head without dial
1889–1892	VS IIb	bullet	?	round tension nut on lower head without dial
1893–1928	VS III	bullet		round tension control on upper head with dial

=== Portable versions ===
White developed a 3/4-sized version for the sake of portability, exactly as Singer was developing the 3/4-sized model VS-3/28/128. It was called the 'Peerless' and its evolution tracked that of its full-sized parent:

Version	Based on	Picture	Notes
Peerless	VS I		tensioner mounted on upper arm like the VS I
White Peerless	VS IIa or IIb	?	tensioner mounted on lower head like the VS IIa and IIb
New White Peerless	VS III		three variants produced—A, B, and C – differing in case and hand-crank.
Gem	Unique design.	White Gem Sewing Machine from about 1886	very small, and very different from the VS and Peerless

=== Shuttle changes ===
The first versions of the White Sewing Machine used a "boat" shuttle that was comparable to those used in contemporary transverse shuttle machines. In 1886 the shuttle was changed to a bullet shape, with a thin rod in the interior upon which the bobbin rotates. The change was probably prompted by the bullet shuttle used in the new Singer Vibrating Shuttle machine, invented the year before, itself a derivative of the White machine. Still later, the shuttle was refined again for the Peerless machines.

Version	Shuttle	Part number
VS I, VS IIa		85 (body), 94 (bobbin)
VS IIa		?
VS IIb		282 (body), 321 (bobbin)
VS III	original shuttle used 1893-1900	349 (assembly), 321 (bobbin)
VS III	"New Shuttle" used 1900 onward	?
VS III	New White Peerless shuttle	1554 (assembly), 321 (bobbin)

=== Badged variants ===
White produced VS machines under several different badges, in addition to the Peerless. These included 'Franklin' (same name as a Singer model 27 clone produced later), 'Mason D', 'Minnesota E', and 'Queen'.

== History ==
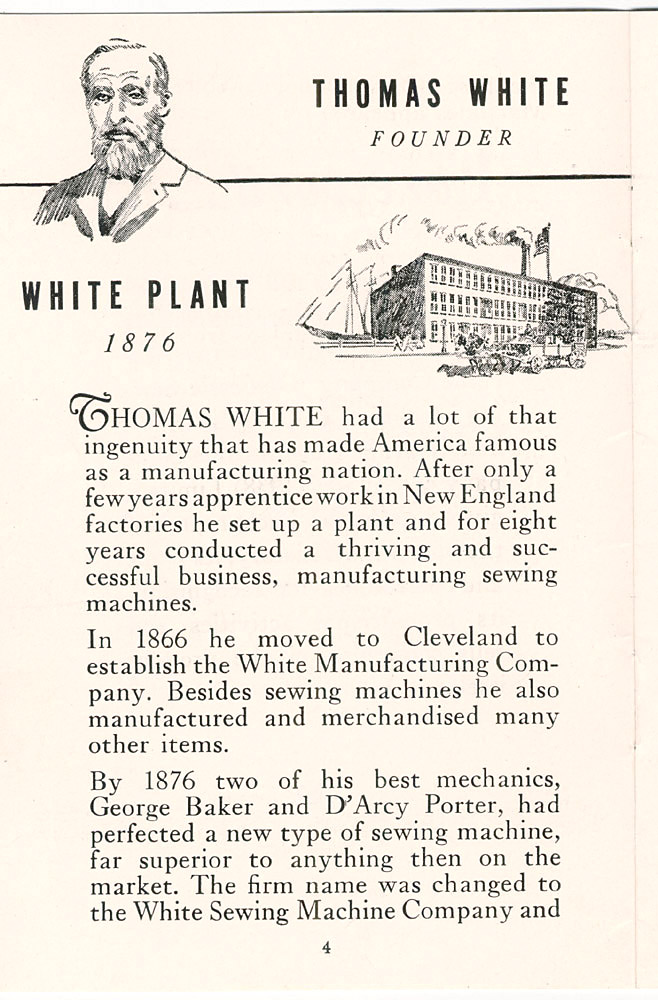
Page from White Sewing Machine Company literature

D'Arcy Porter and George W. Baker designed the machine and are named as inventors on most of the six original US patents, dated 1876–1877, that cover it. The company literature would later look back adoringly on them, calling them "two of [White's] best mechanics" who had "perfected a new type of sewing machine, far superior to anything then on the market".

At the time of its development, the machine was the White Sewing Machine Company's flagship product—so much so that it was simply named the "White Sewing Machine". It was later renamed the "White Vibrating Shuttle" when a rotary hook model named the White Family Rotary was added to the product line.
