= Feed dog =

Sewing machine component

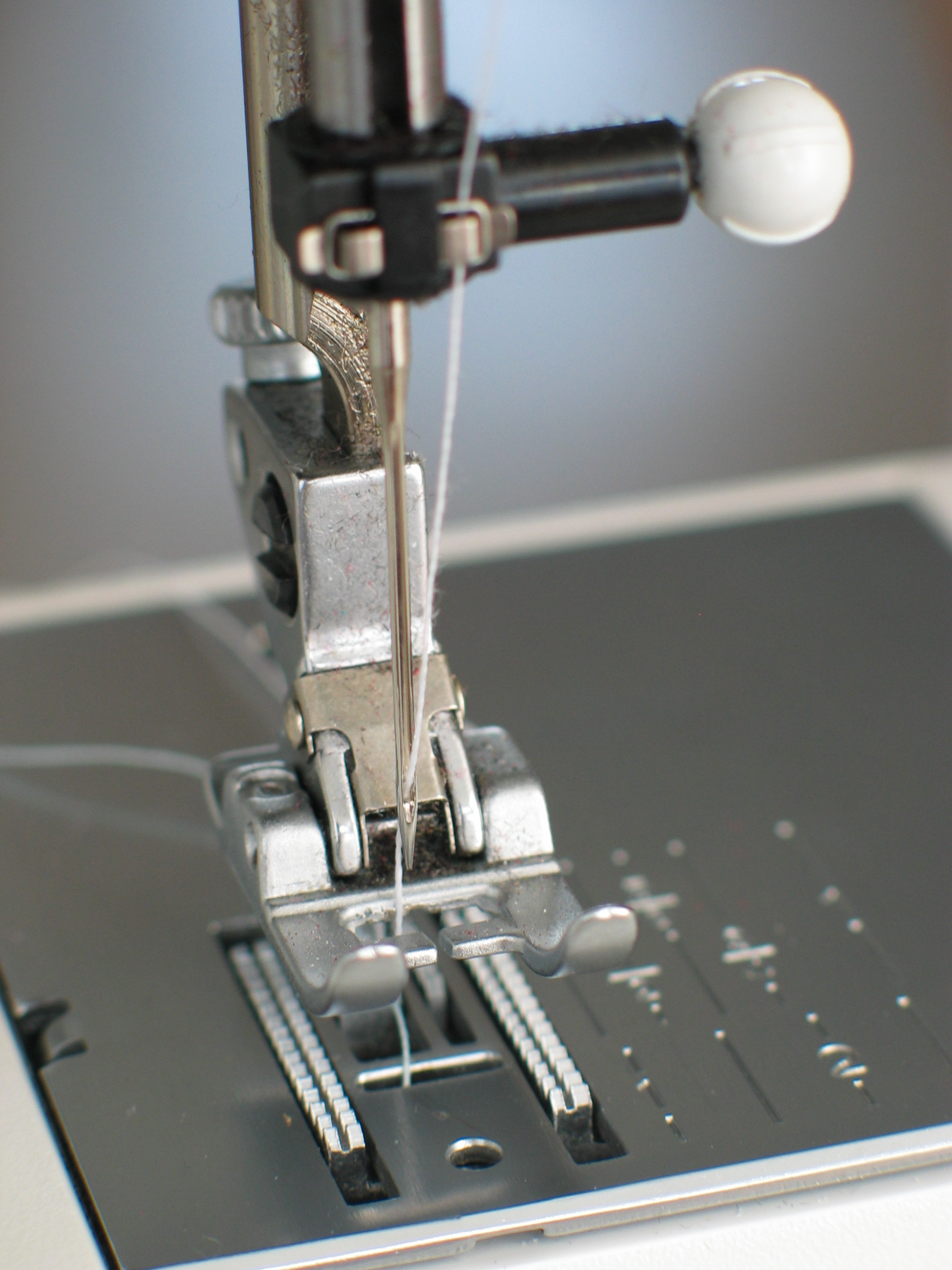
Needle plate, presser foot, and feed dogs

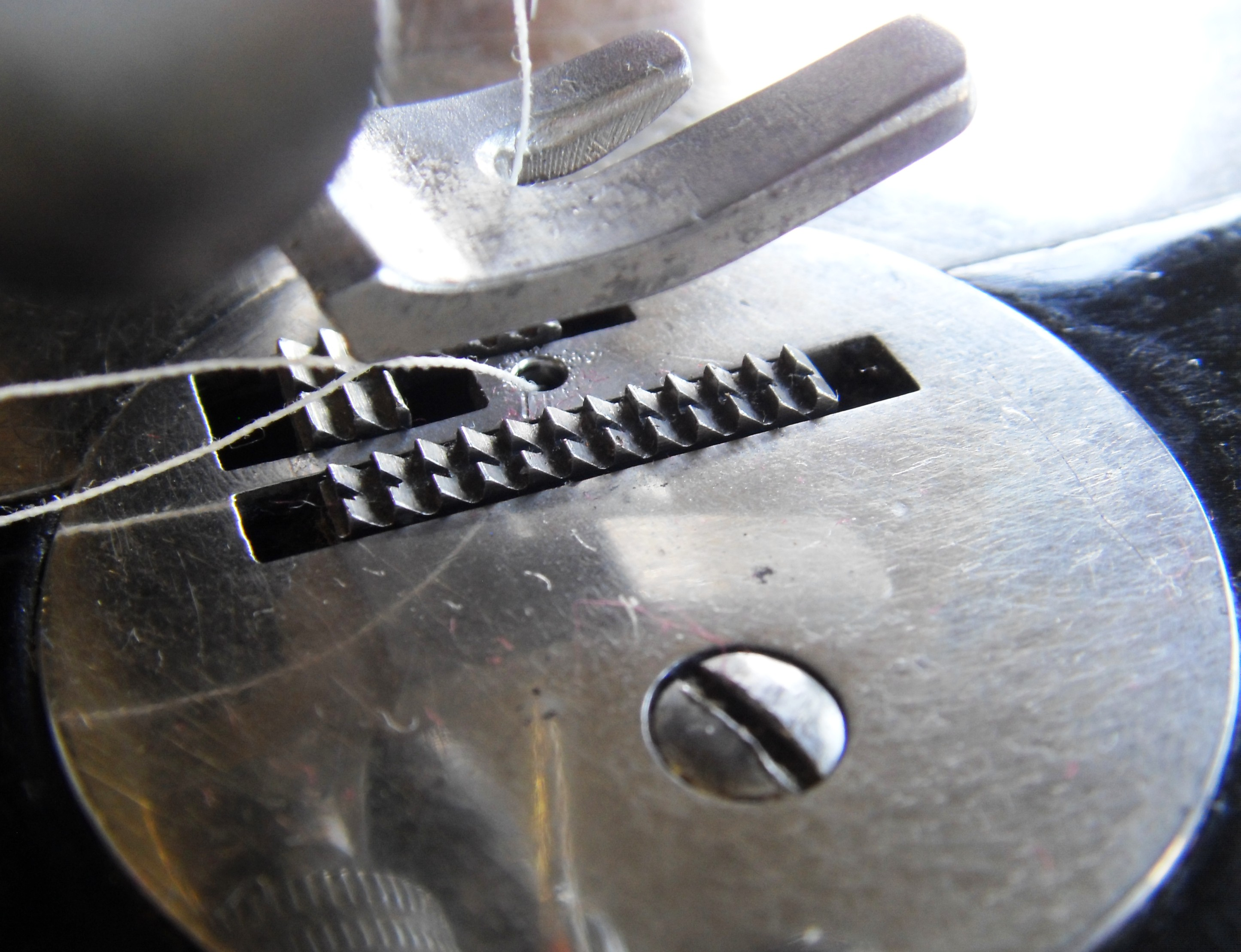
Closeup of feed dogs showing teeth rising up through the needle plate

A feed dog is a movable plate which pulls fabric through a sewing machine in discrete steps between stitches.

== Action ==
A set of feed dogs typically resembles two or three short, thin metal bars, crosscut with diagonal teeth, which move both front to back and up and down in slots in a sewing machine's needle plate: front to back to advance fabric gripped between the dogs and the presser foot toward the needle, and up and down to recess at the end of their stroke, release the fabric, and remain recessed while returning before emerging again to begin a new one.

== Name ==
A mechanical dog is named to suggest the jaw or teeth of a dog, the animal, clamped on to an object, refusing to let go.

This arrangement is called "drop feed" in reference to the way the dogs drop below the needle plate when returning for the next stroke. Allen B. Wilson invented it during the time period 1850 to 1854, while also developing the rotary hook. Wilson called it a "four-motion feed", in reference to the four movements the dogs perform during one full stitch: up into the fabric, back to pull the fabric along to the next stitch, down out of the fabric and below the needle plate, and then forward to return to the starting position.

== Stitch length ==
Virtually all drop-feed sewing machines can vary their stitch length; this is typically controlled by a lever or dial on the front of the machine. They are usually also capable of reversing the feed dogs' motion to pull the fabric backwards to form a backstitch.

Video of feed dogs in action on a Hua Nan sewing machine

== See also ==
- Dog (engineering)
