= Singer New Family =

The Singer 'New Family' Sewing Machine was a transverse shuttle sewing machine produced by the Singer Manufacturing Company during the middle of the 19th century. It was first issued in 1865, and continued to be manufactured into the 20th century. It established Singer's reputation as a manufacturer of reliable "low arm" sewing machines.

By 1882, Singer had sold over 4 million New Family machines; in 1882 alone, the company sold 451,538 New Family sewing machines.
