= Rotary hook =

Sewing machine component

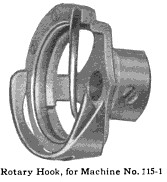
A rotary hook

The rotary hook or rotating hook is a bobbin driver design used in lockstitch sewing machines since the 19th century. It triumphed over competing designs because it can run at higher speeds with less vibration. Rotary hooks and oscillating shuttles are the two most common bobbin drivers in use today.

== Operation ==
Rotary hook creating a lockstitch

The rotary hook continuously rotates in place, hooking the upper thread each time its pointed tip passes the 12 o'clock position. Enough upper thread is pulled from above to pass around the bobbin case, which sits loosely inside the hook frame such that loops of thread can pass completely over it. The excess thread, no longer needed, is then pulled back upward by the sewing machine's take-up arm.

This arrangement is mechanically very simple but also introduces a significant limitation. Since the lower bobbin must pass completely through the upper thread, and the upper thread necessary to complete this passage must be completely withdrawn by the take-up arm, the lower bobbin must either be very small or the take-up arm must have a very long stroke.

== History ==
=== Wilson ===
The technology was invented by Allen B. Wilson in 1851, in steps. Wilson had just left an unsatisfactory business relationship in order to partner with Nathaniel Wheeler, who was impressed by a model of Wilson's vibrating shuttle machine. Ever since developing the vibrating shuttle, Wilson had been ruminating on a plan for a machine that used a rotating hook combined with a traditional reciprocating bobbin. For this hybrid machine he received patent US 8296, issued 1851-Aug-12, (reissued as RE914 on 28 February 1860). Knowing that such a machine would surely lead to patent litigation with his former partners who had bought out the patent for the vibrating shuttle, Wilson kept working, and developed a refined design which kept the bobbin stationary. He filed for patent, and the partners built their first production rotary hook machine the same year, selling it for US$35 (US$891 adjusted). The next year patent US 9041, issued 1852-June-15, was awarded.

The rotary hook design was then called the "Wheeler & Wilson principle" after Wilson's partnership with Wheeler.

Just two years later, in 1853, Scientific American took notice:

"There are 300 of these machines now in operation in various parts of the country, and the work which they can perform cannot be surpassed.... The time must soon come when every private family that has much sewing to do, will have one of these neat and perfect machines; indeed many private families have them now.... The price of one all complete is $125 [USD3184 adjusted]; every machine is made under the eye of the inventor at the company's machine shop, Watertown, Connecticut, so that every one is warranted ... agreement between Mr. Howe* and Messrs. Wheeler, Wilson & Co., so every customer will be perfectly protected...."

* Mr. Howe is mentioned due to the patent thicket that threatened to put the smaller sewing machine companies out of business.

=== White ===
Later, once the patents had expired, the White Sewing Machine Company used it in the popular White Family Rotary machine.
