= Lockstitch =

Stitch made by sewing machines

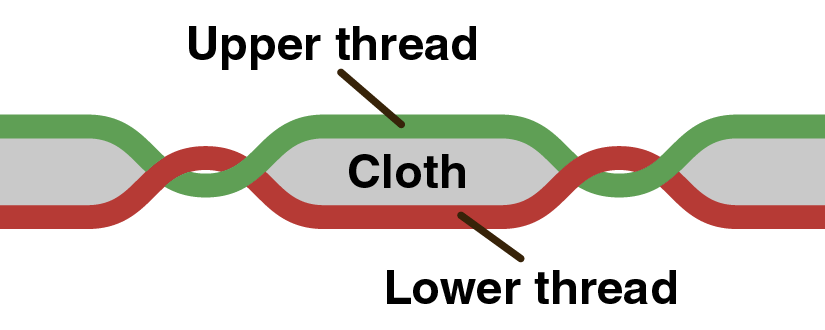
Lockstitch, seen from the side

A lockstitch is the most common mechanical stitch made by a sewing machine. The term "single needle stitching", often found on dress shirt labels, refers to lockstitch.

== Structure ==
The lockstitch uses two threads, an upper and a lower. Lockstitch is named because the two threads, upper and lower, "lock" (entwine) together in the hole in the fabric which they pass through. The upper thread runs from a spool kept on a spindle on top of or next to the machine, through a tension mechanism, through the take-up arm, and finally through the hole in the needle. Meanwhile, the lower thread is wound onto a bobbin, which is inserted into a case in the lower section of the machine below the material.

To make one stitch, the machine lowers the threaded needle through the cloth into the bobbin area, where a rotating hook (or other hooking mechanism) catches the upper thread at the point just after it goes through the needle. The hook mechanism carries the upper thread entirely around the bobbin case so that it has made one wrap of the bobbin thread. Then the take-up arm pulls the excess upper thread (from the bobbin area) back to the top, forming the lockstitch. Then the feed dogs pull the material along one stitch length, and the cycle repeats.

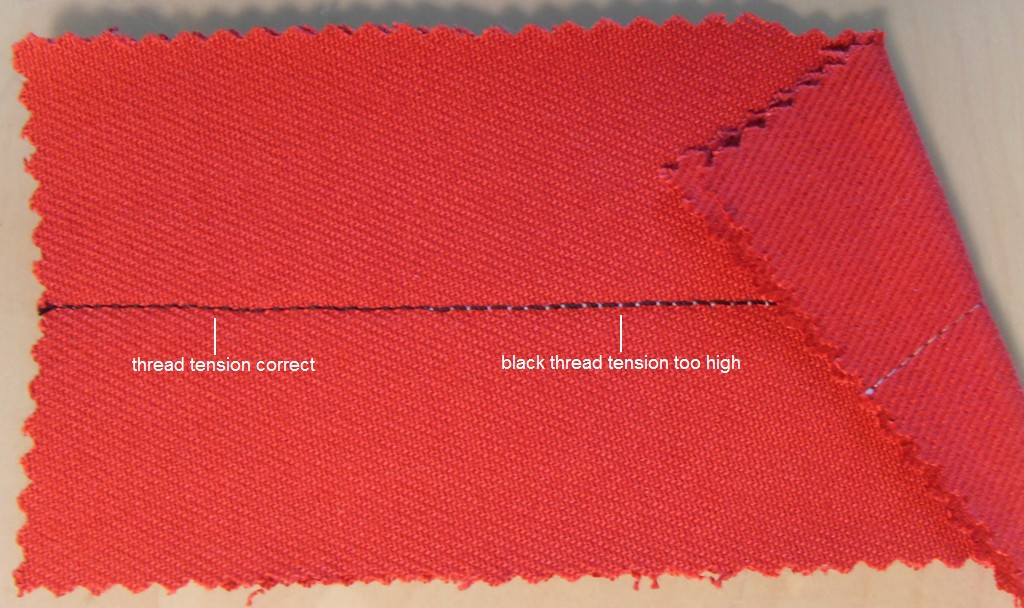
Correct and incorrect thread tension

Ideally, the lockstitch is formed in the center of the thickness of the material — that is, ideally the upper thread entwines the lower thread in the middle of the material. The thread tension mechanisms, one for the upper thread and one for the lower thread, prevent either thread from pulling the entwine point out of the middle of the material.

Prior to the invention of the rotating hook, lockstitch machines placed the lower bobbin inside a miniature shuttle which would be passed through the loop formed when the needle passed through the fabric and then began to retract again.

== Geometry ==
The geometry of the lockstitch is controlled by the presence or absence of:

- sideways movements of the machine's needle
- backwards movements of the machine's feed dogs

In older machines, the needle and feed motion are controlled by mechanical cams. Some modern household machines offer a slot for user-replaceable custom stitch cams. In more recent designs, the needle and feed motion are directly motorized.

=== Straight ===
Straight stitch geometry is produced when the needle has no sideways movements and when the feed dogs are following only in the normal forward "four motion" movement.

Because its two threads run straight and parallel, a straight stitch is not natively stretchable.

=== Zigzag ===
Zigzag stitch geometry is produced when the needle moves rhythmically side to side while stitching, while the feed dogs are following only in the normal forward "four motion" movement. Most lockstitch machines made after the 1960s are capable of doing this; older machines achieve the same stitch with a specialist presser foot which moves the fabric beneath the stationary needle.

Zigzag stitches are used when a stretchable stitch is required, such as when sewing stretchy fabrics.

==== Blind ====
Blind stitch geometry is a derivative of the zigzag. It is created in the same manner, except that the needle zigs to the side and then zags back only once every fourth or fifth stitch. It is used to reduce the visibility of hems and other seam edges.

=== Stretch ===
Stretch stitch geometry is specifically for stretchability. While the needle is moving, as for straight or zigzag stitches, the feed dogs automatically move the fabric forward and backward. As with zigzag stitches, stretch stitching is controlled by mechanical cams, but because of the dual action, stretch stitch machines have double cams. As the double cam rotates, the first follower rides along one track to move the needle bar from side to side, while the second follower rides along a different track to move the feed dogs forward and reverse.

=== Decorative ===
By adding controlled motion of the material being sewn through an additional set of motors, arbitrary customized patterns of 100 cm or more in each direction can be sewn, opening the door to the very popular category of programmable household embroidery machines.

== Prevalence ==
=== Home ===
Most home sewing machines are lockstitch machines, although overlockers (aka sergers) have entered the home market since the 1980s. A lockstitch can also be performed by hand using a sewing awl.

=== Industrial ===
Of a typical garment factory's sewing machines, half might be lockstitch machines, and the other half divided between overlock machines, chain stitch machines, and various other specialized machines.

Industrial lockstitch machines with two needles, each forming an independent lockstitch with its own bobbin, are also very common. There are different types of lockstitch industrial machines. The most commonly used are the drop feed for light and medium duty, and walking foot for medium and heavy duty like the Class 7 with an impressive 3/4" foot lift. This makes the Class 7 able to stitch through heavy materials up to 3/4" with threads as strong as 57 lbs. Originally made by Singer in the US and Europe for supplying the demand for heavy-duty clothing for the troops, for many years after the war this class was not available as new because the market was filled. With the outsourcing of many sewing manufacturing jobs, nowadays many Chinese Class 7 machines are available and built by Federal Specifications giving them a performance equal to the original ones (FSN:3530-3111-1556, FSN: 3530-3111-3675, FSN: 3530-311-1556, FSN: 3530-3111-3075).

Most industrial lockstitch machines sew only a straight line of stitches. Industrial zig-zag machines are available but uncommon, and there are essentially no fancy-pattern stitching industrial machines other than dedicated embroidery and edge decoration machines. Even something as simple as a bar-tack or a buttonhole stitch is usually done by a dedicated machine incapable of doing anything else. When a variety of decorative stitching is required rather than a single stitch, a "commercial" machine (basically a heavy-duty household machine) is usually employed.

== See also ==
- Chain stitch
- Overlock
- Sewing
- Sewing machine
