= List of sewing machine brands =

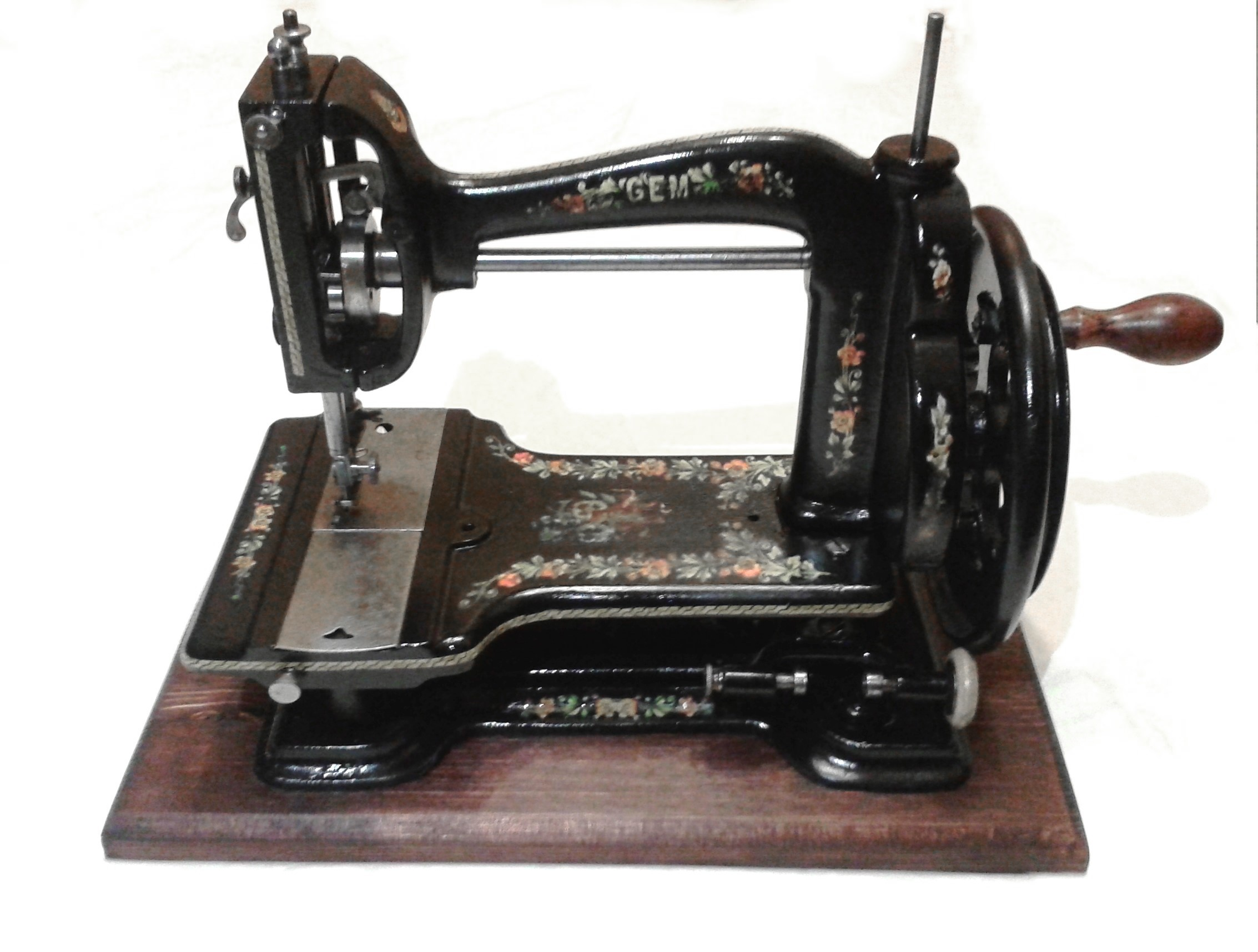
A rare Gem-brand sewing machine produced by the White Sewing Machine Company, circa 1887

A sewing machine is a machine used to stitch fabric and other materials together with thread. Sewing machines were invented during the first Industrial Revolution to decrease the amount of manual sewing work performed in clothing companies.

== Active ==
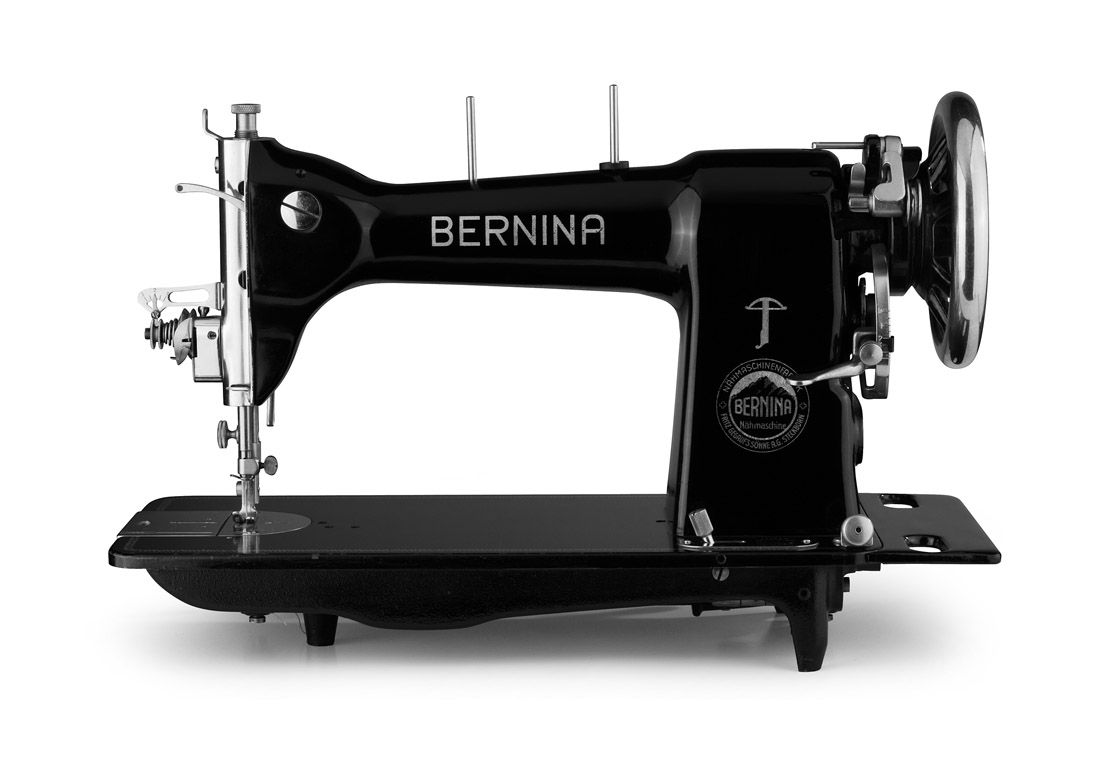
The Bernina International model 105 was the company's first sewing machine, and was manufactured from 1932 to 1945.

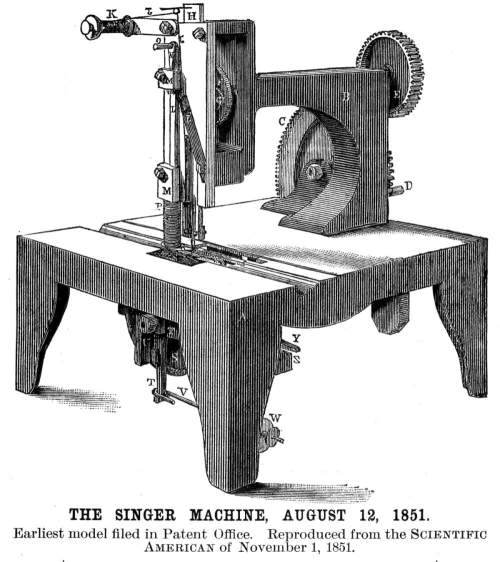
An 1851 Singer sewing machine

- Alfa – a Basque brand.
- Baby Lock – a Tacony brand.
- Bernina – privately owned international manufacturer of sewing, sergers, and embroidery systems. The company was founded in 1893 in Steckborn, Switzerland, by a Swiss inventor Fritz Gegauf.
- Brother – Sewing machines company in Japan. In 1908, Established Yasui Sewing Machine Co. for sewing machine repair service, the predecessor to BROTHER INDUSTRIES, LTD., in Nagoya. Mass-produced home sewing machines starting in 1932.
- ShangGong group (SGSB Co. Ltd) with the brands:
  - Dürkopp Adler
  - Zoje, Chinese, founded in 1994.
  - PFAFF Industrial
- Feiyue Group - Chinese company.
- Frister & Rossmann
- Janome
  - Elna – Swiss sewing machine manufacturer. Elna began operations in the 1940s. In the late 1940s and 1950s, an increased demand for sewing machines in the United States transpired, and Elna machines were imported into the U.S., as well as other sewing machines from companies in Germany, Italy, Switzerland and Sweden.
- Juki
- Łucznik, previously Zakłady Metalowe „Łucznik” (ZM „Łucznik”, now FB "Łucznik" Radom) founded in 1925, started producing sawing machines in 1947, now part of ASPA Electro since 2004; all current models manufactured in Asia since about 2008
- Merrow Sewing Machine Company
- Necchi, Italian sewing machine manufacturer
- SVP Worldwide (Singer Viking PFAFF) – global company with these brands:
  - SINGER – American manufacturer of sewing machines, first established as I. M. Singer & Co. in 1851 by Isaac Merritt Singer with New York lawyer Edward Clark.
  - Husqvarna Viking – (Viking Sewing Machines), formerly named Husqvarna Sewing Machines
  - PFAFF
- Toyota Home Sewing – Aisin Seiki
- Union Special – American industrial sewing machine company based in Huntley, Illinois

== Defunct ==
- American Sewing Machine Company
- Davis Sewing Machine Company
- Domestic Sewing Machine Company, later purchased by White Sewing Machine Company
- Jennie June – manufactured by the June Manufacturing Company, which was founded in 1879.
- Jones Sewing Machine Company
- Kimball and Morton of Glasgow – former manufacturer of domestic and industrial sewing machines based in Glasgow, Scotland, that was active between 1867 and 1955.
- Leader Sewing Machine
- Moldacot Pocket Sewing Machine Company – A short-lived company that made a portable sewing machine between 1885 and 1887
- National Sewing Machine Company – former Belvidere, Illinois-based manufacturer founded in the late 19th century, it manufactured sewing machines and other products.
- New Home, purchased by Janome in 1960 and used as a badge for their own machines
- Riccar (Riccar Company, Riccar Sewing Machine Company Ltd., Riccar Company Ltd.)
- Sewmor
- Taft-Peirce Manufacturing Company
- Tikkakoski
- White Sewing Machine Company

== See also ==
- Glossary of sewing terms
- Lists of brands
- List of sewing stitches
- Barthélemy Thimonnier – a French inventor who is attributed with the invention of the first sewing machine that replicated sewing by hand
- Textile machinery manufacturers
- Textile machinery manufacturers in German-language-wiki/textil-maschinen-bau-unter-nehmen
- Digital textile printing
