= VSM Group =

Swedish manufacturer of sewing machines

Husqvarna Viking
- Founded: 1872 (as a sewing machine manufacturer from the original 1689 arms factory)
- Founder: Royal arms factory artisans in Huskvarna, Sweden (original arms factory founded 1689, sewing machine production started 1872)
- Headquarters: Huskvarna, Sweden (design and historic headquarters)
- Revenue: $33.1 million (approximate recent figure)
- Number of employees: 157 (approximate recent figure)
- Parent: SVP Worldwide (since 2006, after acquisition by Kohlberg & Co. merged Singer, Husqvarna Viking, and Pfaff)
- Website: www.singer.com/pages/husqvarnaviking

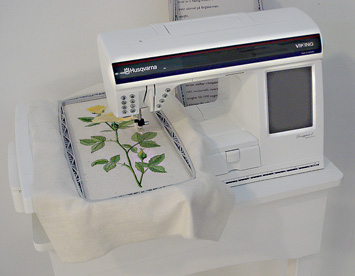
Husqvarna Viking sewing machine

VSM Group AB (Viking Sewing Machines), previously named Husqvarna Sewing Machines is a company based in Huskvarna, Sweden.

Founded in 1872, the company is best known for "smart" (computerized) sewing machines and sergers under the brands Husqvarna Viking and Pfaff. The VSM brand produces several lines of sewing machines, the top being the Designer series and the lowest being the mechanical (non-computerized) Huskystars. The sewing machines change every year or so as the experts create upgrades. In February 2006 VSM Group was bought by Kohlberg & Co., who already owned the brand Singer. Singer and VSM Group have been merged into a company named SVP Worldwide, with headquarters in Hamilton, Bermuda, where the initials are reflecting the brands Singer, Viking and Pfaff.

== History ==
In 1999, VSM Group took over Pfaff sewing machines. In December 2005, Industri Kapital sold VSM Group to Kohlberg Management IV, already owner of the Singer1 brand. The merger of the two entities then gave birth to SVP Worldwide, whose head office is in Hamilton, Bermuda. The name SVP identifies the three brands of the merger (Singer, VSM, Pfaff). All brands used by VSM group are under license from KSIN Luxembourg2.

== See also ==
- List of sewing machine brands
