= Leader Sewing Machine =

The Leader Sewing Machine Company produced sewing machines from 1870 to 1899 or thereabout.

The base of operations shows as 479 to 497 Case Avenue, Cleveland, Ohio and 1115 Olive Street, St Louis, Montana USA on some 1884 and other Victorian trade cards and 1885 envelopes traded on eBay.

Grace Cooper, in her book "The Sewing Machine: Its Invention and Development", lists a "Leader Sewing Machine Company" of Springfield, Massachusetts, with earliest known record of operation being 1882, and ending by 1888.

The A. G. Mason Manufacturing Company manufactured a sewing machine designated the "Leader" amongst others in their line up of Florence, Crown and New Century, there is no known connection to the Leader Sewing Machine Company.

Later, overlockers were made under the Leader brand though they may have been made at a different company to the first one. At least some of the overlockers including a 4 thread model (DC-647) were shipped from China.

== See also ==
- List of sewing machine brands
