= Kimball and Morton of Glasgow =

Kimball & Morton were a Glasgow-based manufacturer of domestic and industrial sewing machines active between 1867 and 1955.

== Company inception ==
The first office set up in the UK by I.M. Singer was at 11 Buchanan Street in Glasgow in 1856, and the manager of this office was called Alonzo Kimball. John Morton was one of the firm’s travelling salesmen for England. Kimball began to patent improvements in sewing machines in his own name on 30 June 1864 (Patent no. 1632), 23 July 1866 (Patent no. 1908) and 11 March 1867 (Patent no. 687). These patents were for machines that were heavyweight and designed for use on canvas and heavyweight materials such as sack cloth. John Morton then joined Kimball and together they created the Kimball & Morton Company in 1867. Patent number 2227, dated 27 June 1877 was the first patent to appear under both names. Until this point their factory was based at 82 Bishop Street, Andertson, Glasgow, and they had showrooms at 114 Argyle Street.

== The 'Lion' ==
Kimball and Morton are most famous for their unusual ‘Lion’ machines and the first of these was manufactured in 1868. The design uses a transverse shuttle lockstitch mechanism with the upper mechanism and the needle bar secreted beneath a bronzed cast iron lion. A pair of matching legs could be attached to hide the lower needle bar and presser foot when the machine was not in use. The treadle was equally ornate with depictions of a lion and eagle as well as the motto ‘Strength and Speed’. The Lion sewing machine was the only British-made sewing machine to win a medal at the American Centennial Exhibition in Philadelphia in 1876. A rare example of both the Lion treadle machine of 1868 and hand crank model of 1902 can be seen at Glasgow Museums Resource Centre.

In March 2019 a Kimball and Morton Lion sewing machine was valued between £10,000 and £15,000 on BBC programme 'The Antiques Roadshow'

The company also produced successful industrial machines that were used for work with such items as sails. When patents for the Singer 12k and 13k expired Kimball and Morton produced a family and medium machine in 1878 that continued to be produced right into the early 1900s.

Kimball and Morton became a limited company in 1887 with its main office and factory situated at Bothwell Circus in Glasgow.

On 9 October 1902 the sons of John Morton put in a patent (No.21933) for the second Lion machine which could be made as a hand or treadle machine. The lion (sculpted to look like the work of J. Vasteugh Gyorgy) stands on rocks that are hinged to allow the needle bar, presser foot and shuttle race to be seen whilst the head of the lion is also hinged to allow the user to insert the top reel and alter tension.

Kimball and Morton produced many different models of machine over the years and moved to new premises at 11a Norfolk Street, Glasgow.

== See also ==
- List of sewing machine brands
