= Tape edge machine =

Type of sewing machine

A tape edge machine is a type of sewing machine used in the bedding industry to finish the top and bottom edges of a mattress. The machine is used to stitch the top and bottom panels of a mattress to the mattress edge, and to cover that raw edge with a protective tape or ribbon. Some tape-edge machines are fully automated, capable of turning corners and flipping the mattress without involvement from the operator.

The protective tape attached by a tape-edge machine, also known as tape-edge or binding tape, can be either knit or woven, and can come in a variety of patterns and colors.

Union Special, a sewing machine company founded in 1881, designed the first tape-edge machine and premiered it at the 1934 World's Fair in Chicago.
