= Feiyue Group =

Large Chinese non-governmental sewing machine company

China Feiyue Sewing Machinery Group was founded in 1986 by Qiu Jibao, and is one of the largest non-state enterprises in China. Its headquarters are in Taizhou, Zhejiang province, and the company has over 30 international offices in other countries.

== Overview ==
The group produces 31 series of domestic and industrial sewing equipment, including over 300 separate products. Most of the group's sales are of computerized industrial sewing machines, electronic domestic sewing machines, and automated embroidery machines. Annual sales have reached US$166,000,000.00 worldwide and have been increasing steadily for the last decade, with the company supplying international companies such as the Singer Corporation.

At the beginning of 2009, China Feiyue went through a restructuring process in order to minimize financial damage from the 2008 financial crisis. Feiyue saw its sales plummet due to fear of an economic downturn from its largest customers. As part of the restructuring, the company gained several new investors, and the company was able to enter other markets such as recycling, automotive and other industries with the help of the new participants.

== China Feiyue USA Inc. ==
China Feiyue USA Inc. was established in 1997 in Pomona, California, primarily to gather market data and research information about the North American market, but also to offer aftersales service to North American customers. The company has since moved its facilities to Chino, California. To date, it has formed partnerships with over 1,500 dealers in the United States to promote, distribute or service Feiyue products. China Feiyue USA Inc. is led by general manager Ke Dong, a native of Hangzhou, China.

== See also ==
- List of sewing machine brands
