= Featherweight (disambiguation) =

Featherweight is a weight class in the combat sports of boxing, kickboxing, mixed martial arts, and Greco-Roman wrestling.

Including:

- Featherweight (MMA) in mixed martial arts refers to different weight classes
- Super featherweight junior lightweight (IBF and WBO)
- Super bantamweight, also known as junior featherweight or light featherweight

== Characters ==
- Featherweight, a character appearing in DC Comics

== Music ==
- "Featherweight", 1977 song by Count Basie from the album Prime Time
- "Featherweight", 1995 song by Candlebox, B-side to the single "Simple Lessons"
- "Featherweight", 2020 song by Fleet Foxes from the album Shore
- "Featherweight", 2023 song by Local Natives from the album Time Will Wait for No One

== Products ==
- Singer Featherweight, a model series of sewing machines produced from 1933 to 1968
