= Union Special =

American industrial sewing company

- Founded: 1881
- Headquarters: 1 Union Special Plaza, Huntley, IL 60142
- Owner: Juki (1989-2008)
- Website: http://www.unionspecial.com

Union Special (Union Special Machine Company) is an American industrial sewing machine company based in Huntley, Illinois, and is one of the oldest remaining sewing machine companies. The company opened its current factory, which was formerly a Borden milk factory, in 1948.

== See also ==
- List of sewing machine brands
