= Frister & Rossmann =

German manufacturer of sewing machines and typewriters

- Company type: Privately held company
- Industry: Sewing and embroidery systems
- Founded: 1864; 161 years ago in Berlin, Germany
- Founders: Gustav Rossmann; Robert Frister

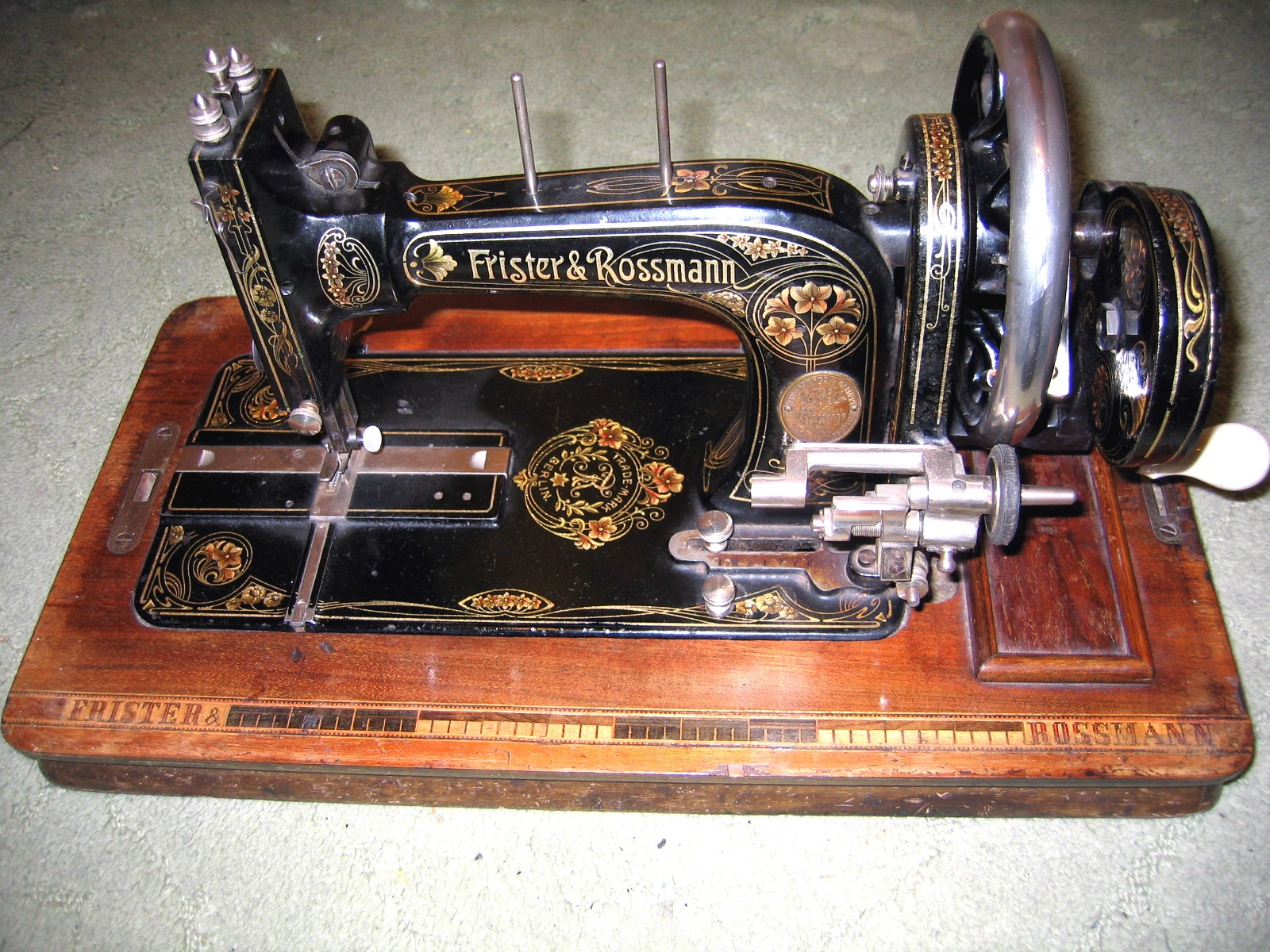
A German design Frister & Rossmann sewing machine from about 1920

Frister & Rossmann is a German manufacturer of sewing and embroidery systems. Some of the early 1900s manual sewing machines were ornately decorated.

== History ==
Frister & Rossmann was founded in 1864 in Berlin by Gustav Rossmann and Robert Frister.

The UK importer was sued by the Singer company in 1883.

The company became Germany's largest sewing machine manufacturer, until 1902.

The London agent was shut down during World War I.

Currently, the company is owned by SMD Retail Limited, the parent company of Sewing Machines Direct.

== Awards ==
In the 1880s, the company was awarded at various international exhibitions, such as those in Sydney, Adelaide, Crystal Palace, Amsterdam, London, Melbourne, Edinburgh and Berlin.

== See also ==
- Machine embroidery
