= Sewmor =

Brand of sewing machines

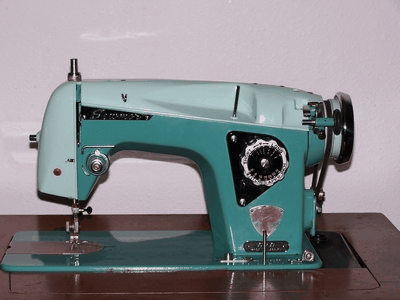
Sewmor Model 620

Sewmor sewing machines were designed and manufactured in post-World War II Japan (mainly using parts from miscellaneous Asian countries, though the 900 series motors are said to be manufactured in Belgium) and imported/badged by the Consolidated Sewing Machine Corporation in New York City, New York.

Numerous models existed, with many units proving to have a fairly reliable track record over the years. A few models have recently been becoming a more sought collector's item, generally due to their aesthetic similarities to American automobiles of the same era.

== See also ==
- List of sewing machine brands
