= Flatlock =

Flatlock is a sewing machine stitch that butts two edges of fabric with no overlap. The flatlock stitch is used on swimwear, active wear, and infant clothing.

== Description ==
It is commonly used in sports wear as there are less fabric to chafe. A similar stitch can be achieved on overlock machines, but the result is thicker as the cloth slightly overlaps. However, some industrial overlock machines can do flatlock stitches. Yamato Sewing Machine Mfg. advertises their interlock sewing machines as "Flatlock/Coverstitch" machines.

While home overlock machines can produce a mock flatlock stitch that is similar to the flatlock of a commercial flatlock machine, it lacks strength because it only contains 3 threads instead of the 6 threads in a true flatlock stitch.
