= SVP Worldwide =

U.S.-headquartered manufacturing company

- Company type: Private
- Industry: Consumer goods
- Founded: 2006; 20 years ago
- Headquarters: Nashville, Tennessee, U.S.
- Key people: Carl-Martin Lindahl (CEO)
- Products: Sewing machines
- Owner: Platinum Equity
- Website: svpworldwide.com

SVP Worldwide is an American privately held company that designs, manufactures, and distributes consumer sewing machines and accessories around the world under three brands: Singer, Husqvarna Viking, and Pfaff.

The company's corporate headquarters is located in Nashville, Tennessee, and is supplemented by regional headquarters and sales offices located in Milan (Italy), São Paulo (Brazil), and Sydney (Australia).

Via its affiliates, SVP operates in more than 180 countries.

The company has its central R&D, sales, and customer service employees in the Huskvarna/Jönköping region of Sweden with support teams in Shanghai, London and Nashville.

== History ==
SVP was formed when Kohlberg & Company, an American private equity firm that owned the Swedish VSM Group (owner of the Husqvarna Viking and Pfaff sewing machine brands), combined VSM with Singer, which it acquired in 2004 for $134 million. The company was founded in 2006 and was formerly headquartered in Hamilton, Bermuda.

In 2018, Kohlberg & Company sold SVP Worldwide to Ares Management, a publicly traded global asset manager based in Los Angeles.

In 2020, SVP's subsidiary Singer reported an increase in machine sales due to the COVID-19 pandemic. In response, the company released a variety of patterns for DIY reusable face masks. Also in 2020, SVP collaborated with the Amazon Prime show Making the Cut.

In 2021, SVP unveiled an upcoming sewing machine, the Pfaff Creative Icon 2, which will operate with artificial intelligence functions. Also in 2021, SVP was acquired by Platinum Equity.

== See also ==
- List of sewing machine brands
