= Pfaff =

German sewing machine manufacturer

MAX PFAFF Industrial
- Founded: 1862; 164 years ago as PFAFF, Kaiserslautern, Germany
- Founder: Georg Max Pfaff
- Headquarters: Kaiserslautern, Germany
- Key people: Min Zhang (chairman); Cornelia Mast (CEO)
- Number of employees: 180 (2014)
- Parent: SGSB Co. Ltd
- Website: www.pfaff-industrial.com/en

PFAFF (German: PFAFF Industriesysteme und Maschinen AG, PFAFF Industrial) is a German manufacturer of sewing machines and is now owned by the SGSB Co. Ltd.

== History ==
PFAFF was founded in Kaiserslautern, Germany, in 1862 by instrument maker Georg Michael Pfaff (1823–1893). Pfaff's first machine was handmade, and designed to sew leather in the manufacture of shoes.

In 1885, Georg Michael Pfaff opened a sewing machine shop in London. The PFAFF factory was expanded and modernized. Georg Pfaff, the second son of the founder, took over the management of the company after his father's death in 1893 and expanded it further with great success. The founder's firstborn son, Jacob Pfaff, died in 1889. His daughter, Lina Pfaff, took over the company in 1917 when her brother Georg died and ran it successfully on a global scale until 1926. Her nephew, Karl Pfaff, took over the company when she retired at the age of seventy-two.

It made its one-millionth machine in 1910. Pfaff was bought by Husqvarna Viking in 1999.

In 2006, the American equity firm Kohlberg & Company, owner of Singer, acquired Swedish VSM Group, owner of Husqvarna Viking and PFAFF, thereby creating SVP Worldwide.

In March 2013, the German holding company of SGSB Group Co. Ltd., ShangGong (Europe) Holding Corp. GmbH, took over 100% of the shares of PFAFF Industriesysteme und Maschinen AG.

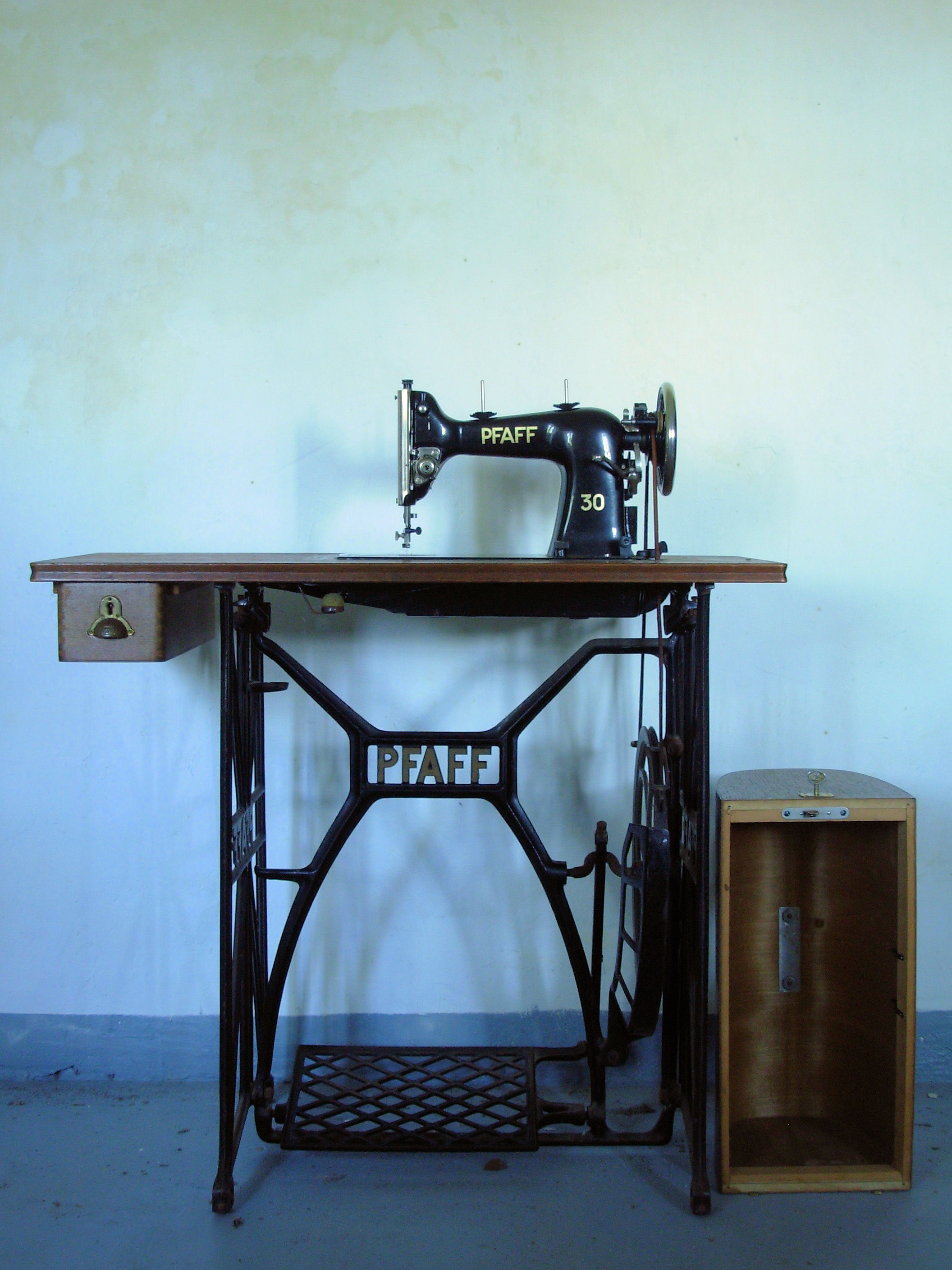
A PFAFF treadle sewing machine

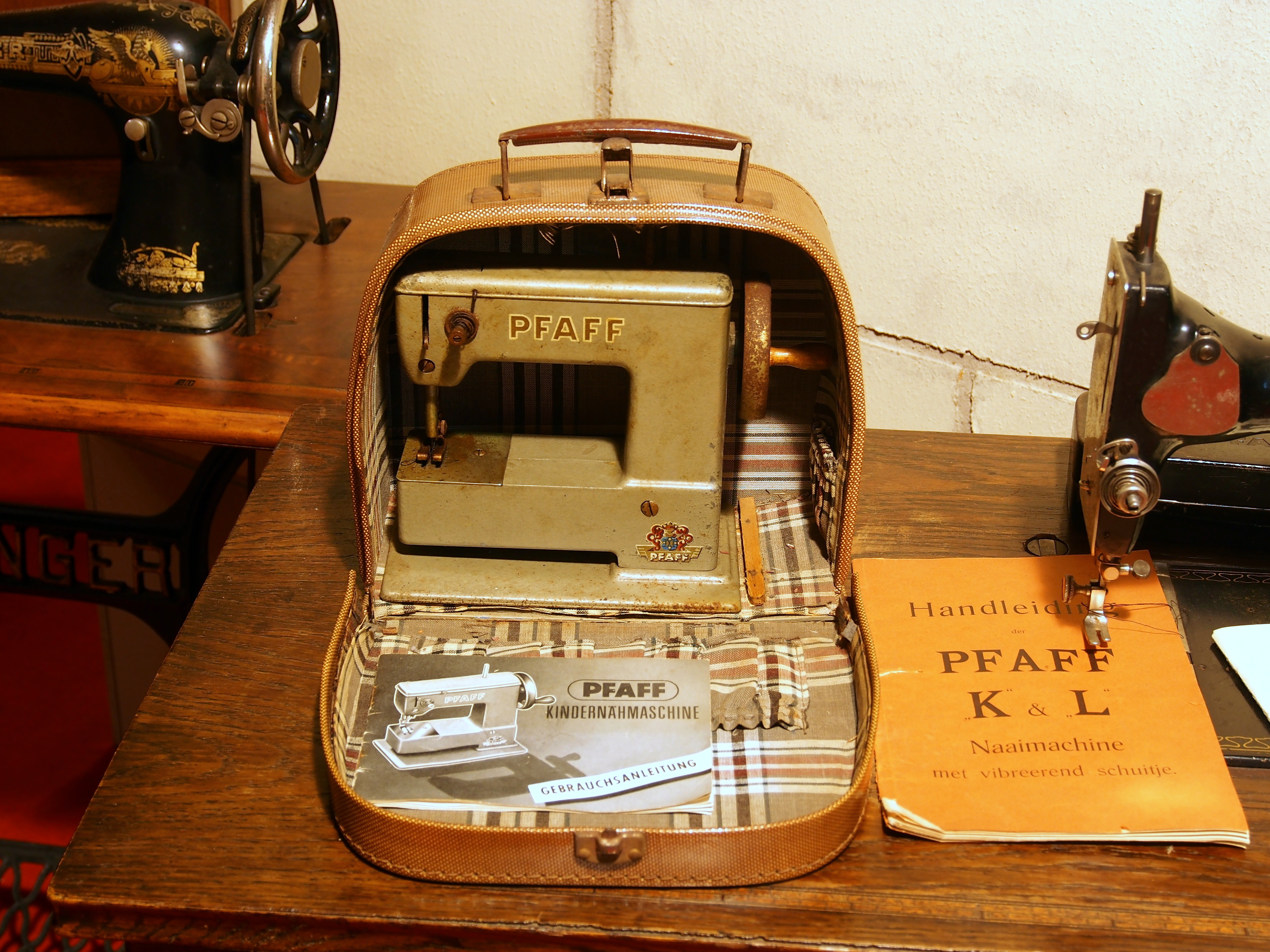
Pfaff portable sewing machine

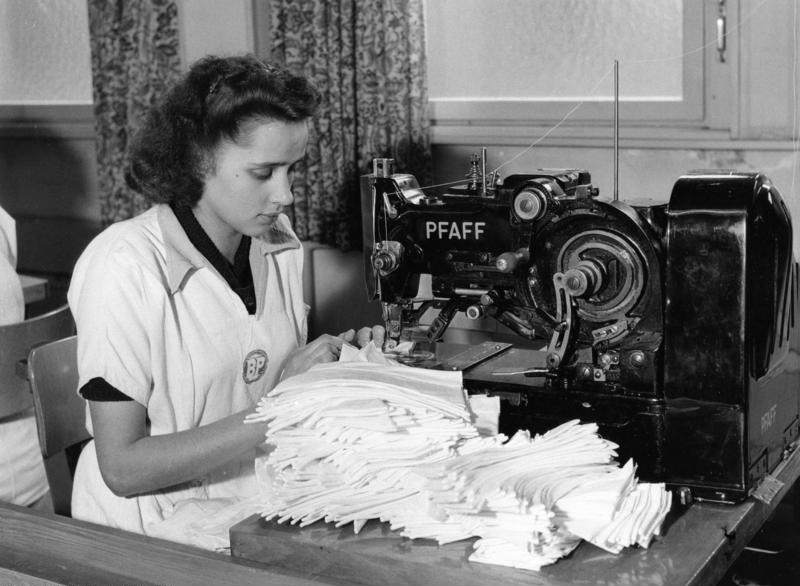
Bundesarchiv B 145 Bild-F001162-0004, Köln, Cologne Bierbaum-Proenen textile factory; this buttonhole machine works collar buttonholes.

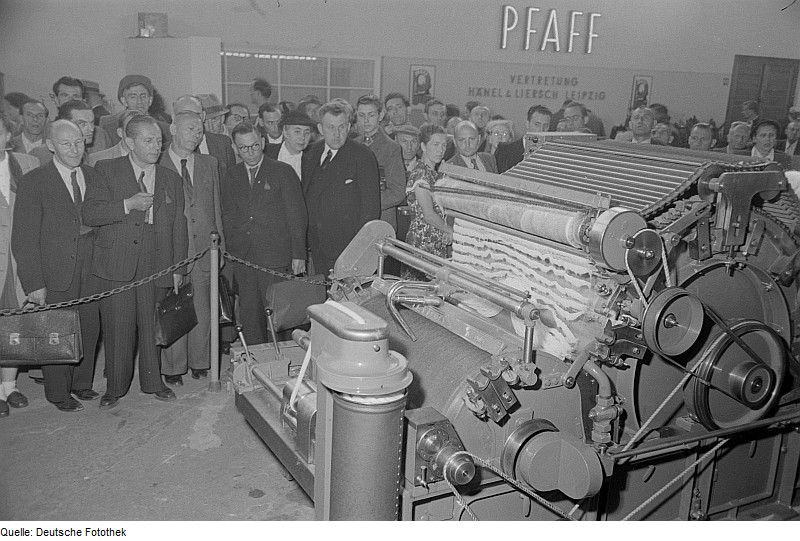
Visitors at the demonstration of a Pfaff textile machine at the 1953 Technical Fair

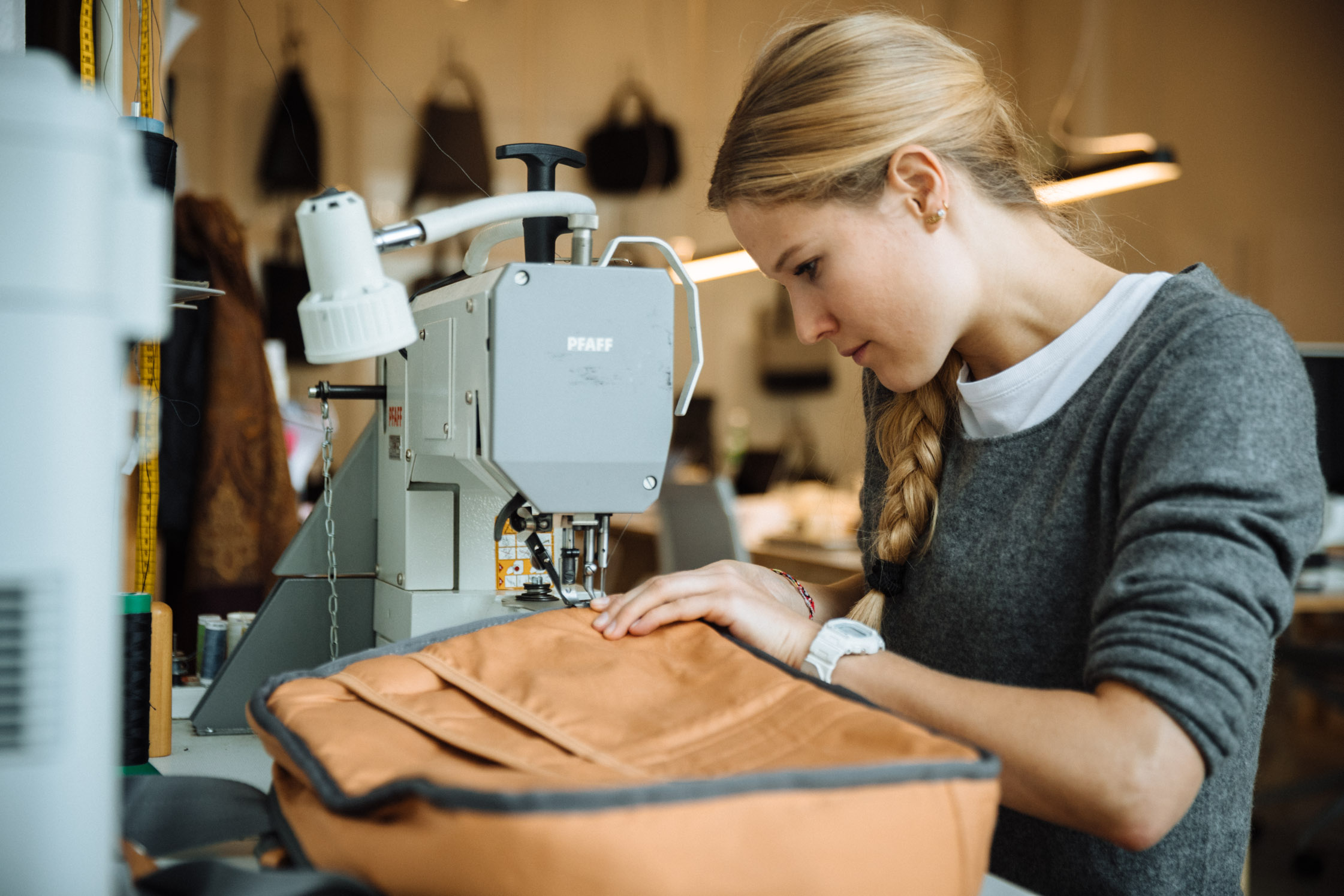
Woman using a Pfaff machine to create a bag

== See also ==
- List of sewing machine brands
