= Singer Featherweight =

Model series of lockstitch domestic sewing machines

Singer 221, 221K, 221J, 222K
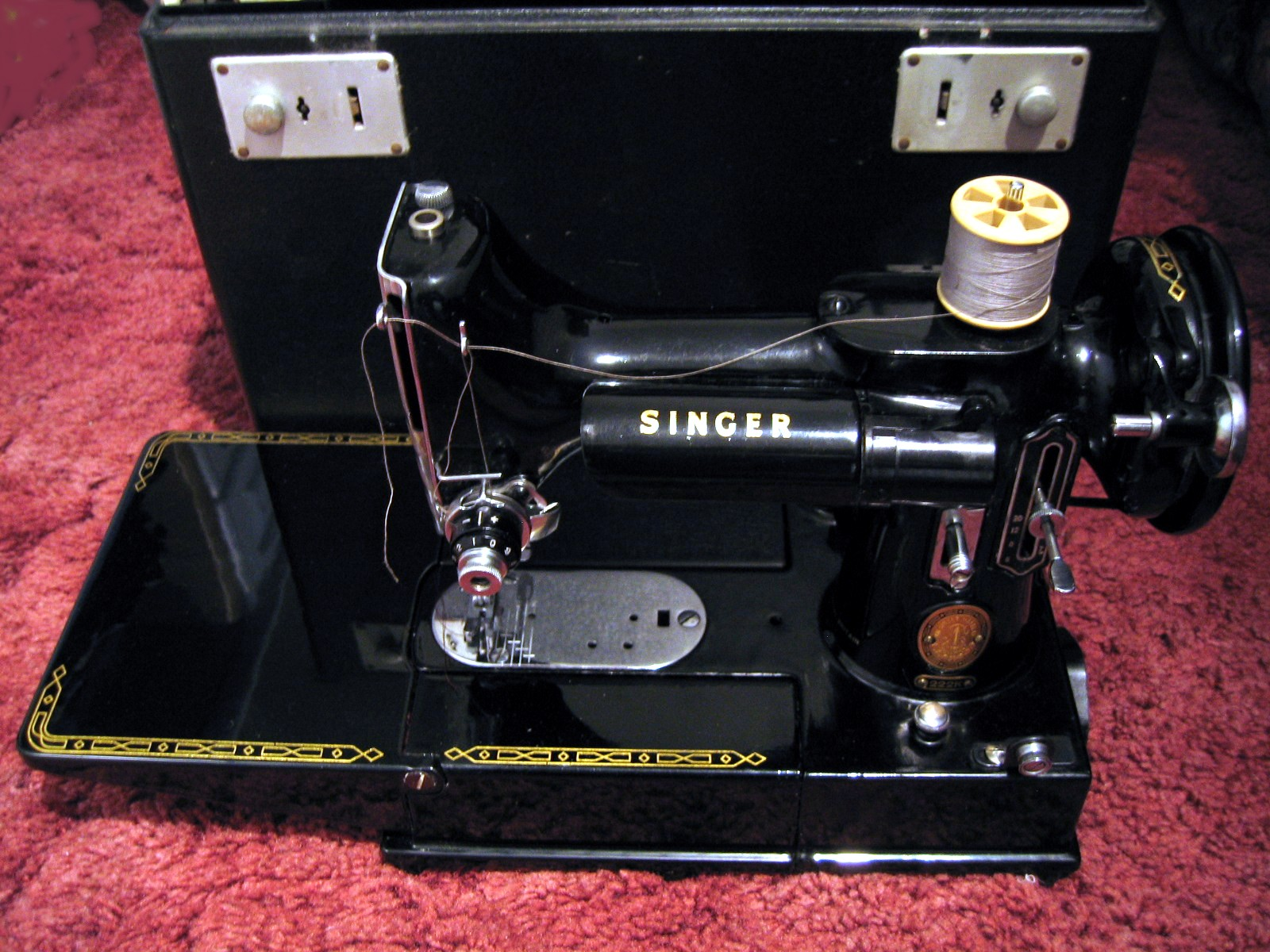
- A 1954 Singer 222K
- Manufacturer: Singer Manufacturing Company
- AKA: Featherweight
- Assembly: USA: Elizabethport; UK: Kilbowie; Canada: Saint-Jean-sur-Richelieu
- Material: Fabric
- Needle(s): single 15x1
- Stitch formation: Straight lockstitch; Vertical side-facing rotary hook; Drop feed

The Singer Featherweight is a model series of lockstitch domestic sewing machines produced by the Singer Manufacturing Company from 1933 to 1968, significant among sewing machines for their continuing popularity, active use by quilters and high collector's value.

== Design ==
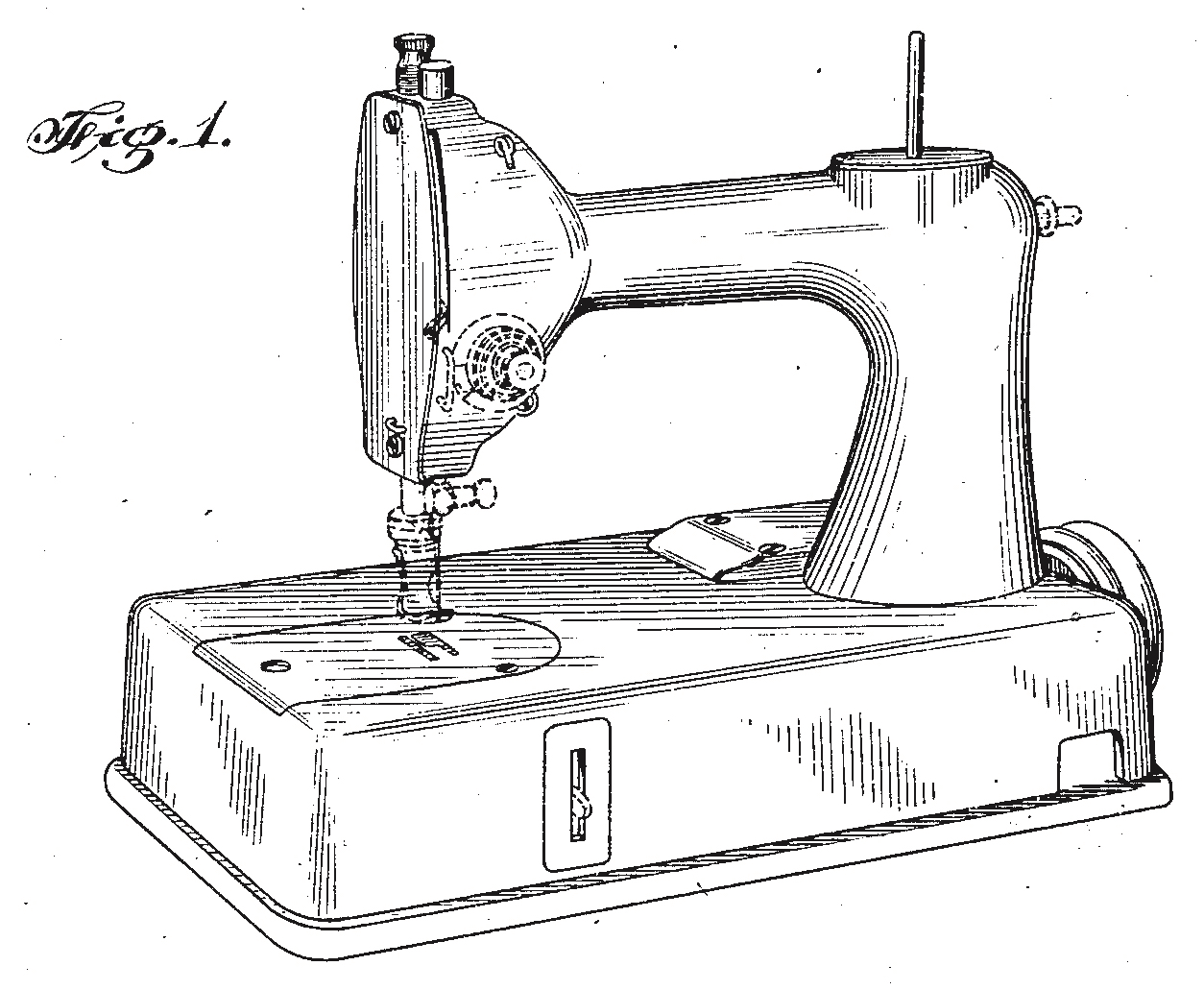
A patent illustration of the Osann portable sewing machine

A typical early 20th century sewing machine, like the Singer 27, was designed to be mounted in a treadle or table, and though reduced-size models with hand cranks and wooden cases were introduced, their weight strains the meaning of the word 'portable.' The first sewing machine designed for portability, with a completely enclosed movement, was invented in 1928 by Raymond Plumley and Richard Hohmann, engineers for the Frederick Osann Company, who took advantage of then-recent advances in alloy technology to create a machine housed in a lightweight cast aluminum body. Osann subcontracted manufacture and assembly to the Standard Sewing Machine Company of Cleveland, Ohio, which marketed the machine under a number of brands, including Osann, Standard, and General Electric.

Both companies encountered financial difficulties as the Great Depression worsened; Osann was acquired by Standard, which was in turn acquired by the Singer Manufacturing Company. Singer continued production of the Sewhandy under the Standard brand through the early 30s while working on an improved design, which would be introduced as the Model 221 during the 1934 World's Fair. Like the Sewhandy, the 221 featured aluminum construction and small size, weighing only 11 pounds (5.0 kg), as well as an improved self-fastening bobbin case which simplified the design of the machine's bobbin driver.

== Production ==
It is estimated that Singer produced and sold some 3.0–3.5 million Featherweight machines during the model's lifetime. Production of the original Featherweight ended in 1961, but continued at Singer factories in Quebec and Scotland until 1969. Later British versions have numerous cost-saving components including a belt drive and a simpler front thread guide. An especially sought-after free arm version, Model 222K, was produced in Scotland from c.1953 to c.1961 exclusively for the non-US market.

== Attachments ==
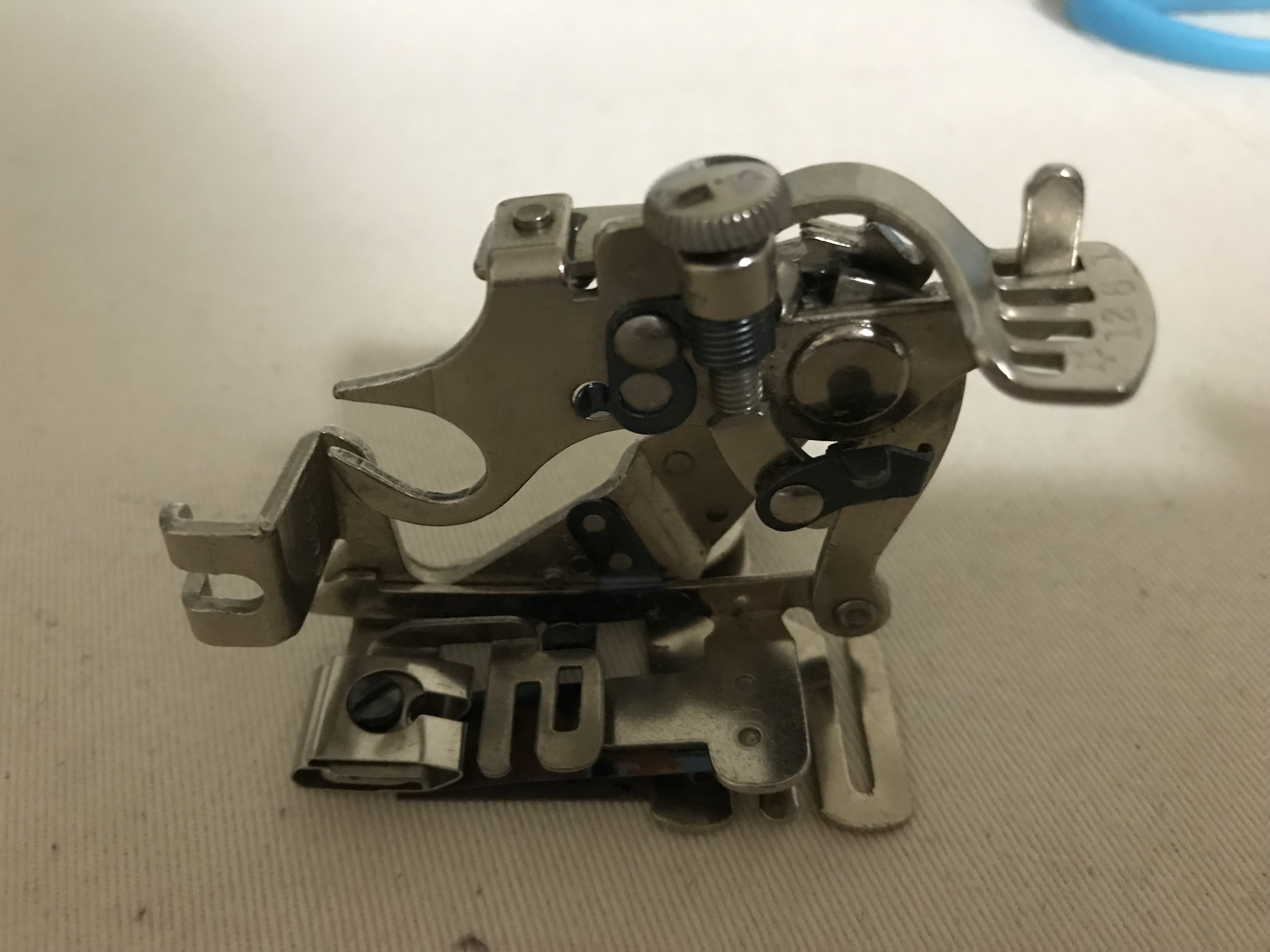
Singer sewing-machine ruffler attachment

A number of attachments are available for the Featherweight, including the following feet:

- Foot hemmer – used for hemming, making hemmed and felled seams, and for sewing on lace while hemming
- Adjustable hemmer – to make hems from 3/16" to 15/16" wide
- Multi-slotted binder – to apply unfolded bias binding 15/16" in width and folded bias bindings in sizes 1–5 (1/4" – 1/2"), or to add piping
- Edge-stitcher – replaces the presser foot, used to accurately stitch at the very edge of the fabric
- Gatherer – used to slightly gather material
- Ruffler – to make and apply ruffles in one step, to pipe ruffles, or to pleat material
