= Singer Corporation =

American manufacturer of sewing machines

- Industry: Manufacturing
- Founded: 1851; 175 years ago in New York City
- Founders: Isaac M. Singer; Edward C. Clark
- Headquarters: Nashville, Tennessee, U.S.
- Products: Sewing machine Upholstery
- Website: www.singer.com

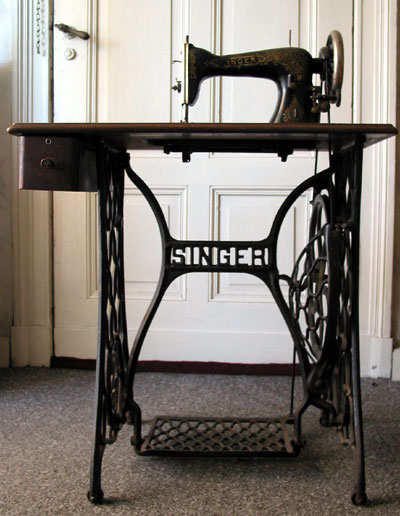
A Singer treadle sewing machine

Singer Corporation is an American manufacturer of consumer sewing machines, first established as I. M. Singer & Co. in 1851 by Isaac M. Singer with New York lawyer Edward C. Clark. Best known for its sewing machines, it was renamed Singer Manufacturing Company in 1865, then the Singer Company in 1963. The global headquarters are based in Nashville, Tennessee. Its first large factory for mass production was built in 1863 in Elizabeth, New Jersey.

== History ==
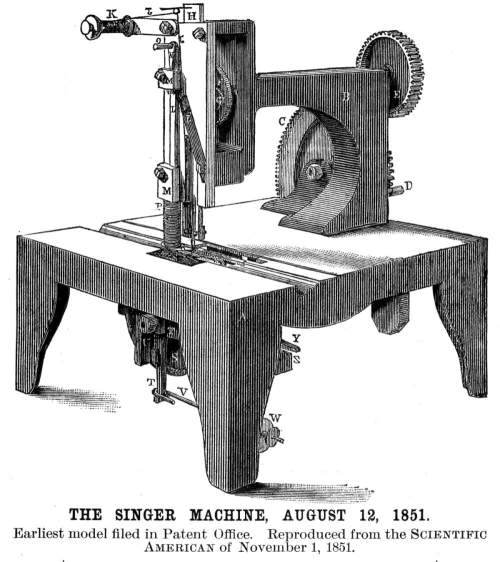
A Singer 1851 sewing machine

Singer's original design was the first practical sewing machine for general domestic use. It incorporated the basic eye-pointed needle and lock stitch, developed by Elias Howe, who won a patent-infringement suit against Singer in 1854.

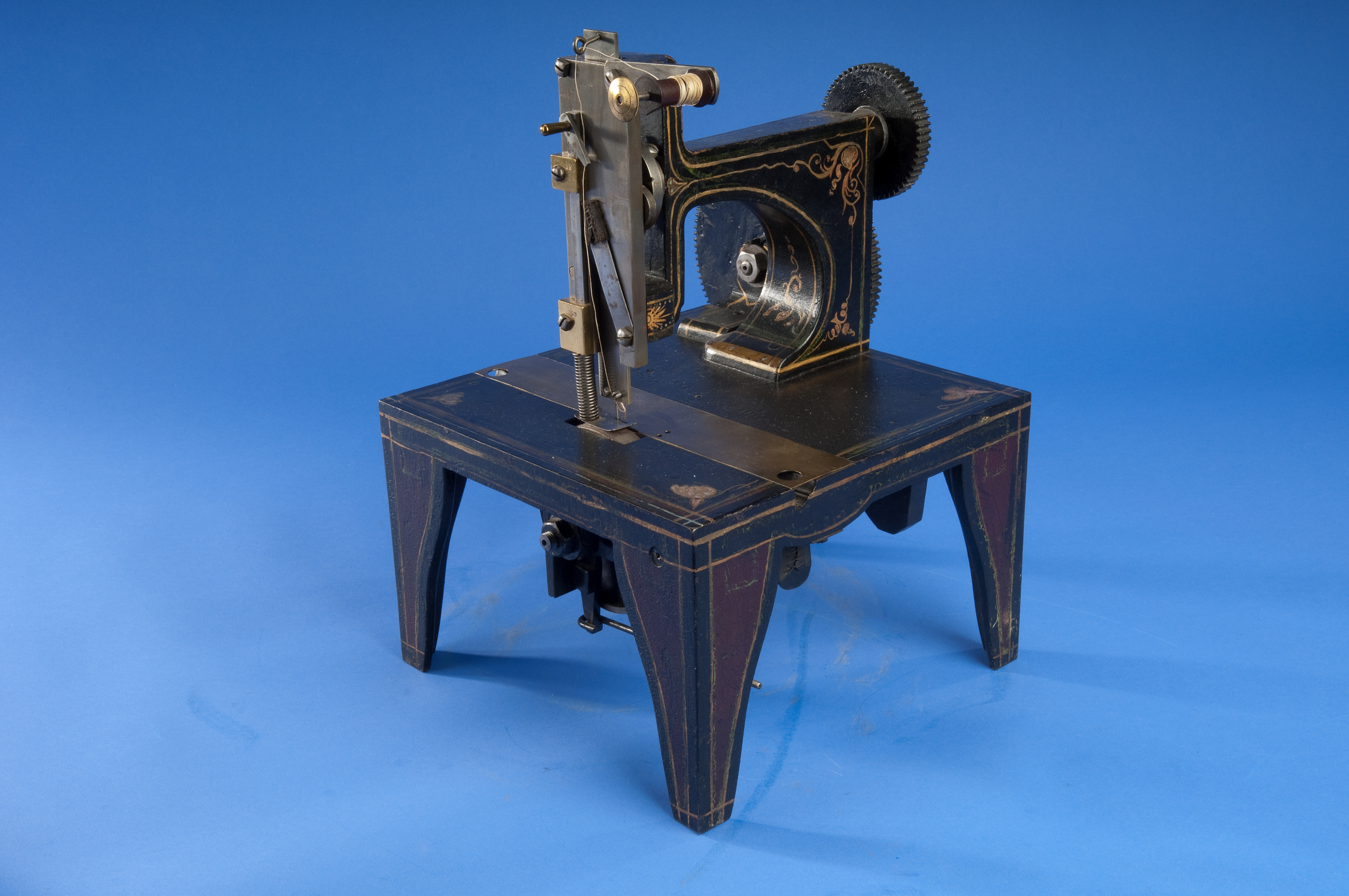
Singer's patent model for his sewing machine

Singer obtained patent no. 8294 in August 1851 for an improved sewing machine that included a circular feed wheel, thread controller, and power transmitted by gear wheels and shafting.

Singer consolidated enough patents in the field to enable him to engage in mass production, and by 1860 his company was the largest manufacturer of sewing machines in the world.

In 1885, Singer built a new works at Kilbowie (designed by Robert Ewan) which produced its first "vibrating shuttle" sewing machine, an improvement over contemporary transverse shuttle designs (see bobbin drivers). The Singer company began to market its machines internationally in 1855 and won first prize at the Paris World's Fair that year. The company demonstrated the first workable electric sewing machine in 1910. Singer was also a marketing innovator and a pioneer in promoting the use of installment payment plans.

=== Early sales figures ===
Year	1853	1859	1867	1871	1873	1876
Units	810	10,953	43,053	181,260	232,444	262,316

Old Singer logo

By 1876, Singer was claiming cumulative sales of two million sewing machines and had put the two millionth machine on display in Philadelphia.

=== Singer in Scotland ===
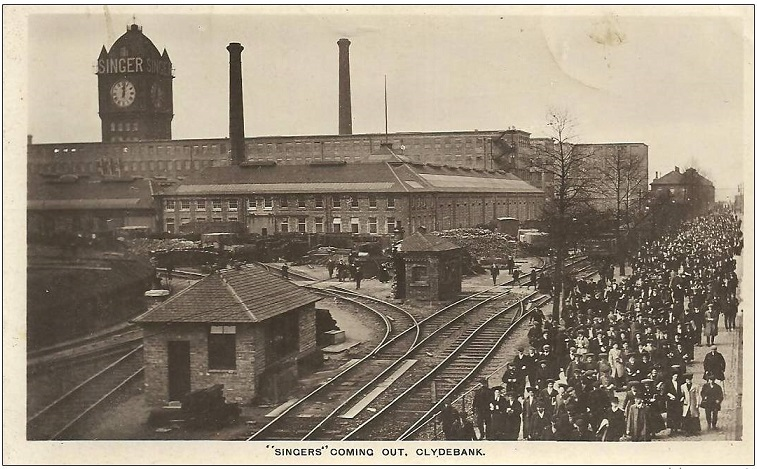
Workers leaving Singer sewing machine factory on Clydebank

In 1867, the Singer Company decided that the demand for their sewing machines in the United Kingdom was sufficiently high to open a local factory in Glasgow on John Street. The Vice President of Singer, George Ross McKenzie selected Glasgow because of its iron making industries, cheap labour, and shipping capabilities. Demand for sewing machines outstripped production at the new plant and by 1873, a new larger factory was completed on James Street, Bridgeton. By that point, Singer employed over 2,000 people in Scotland, but they still could not produce enough machines.

In 1882, McKenzie, by then President-elect of the Singer Manufacturing Company, undertook the ground breaking ceremony on 46 acres (19 ha) of farmland at Kilbowie, Clydebank. Originally, two main buildings were constructed, each 800-foot (240 m) long, 50-foot (15 m) wide and three storeys high. These were connected by three wings. Built above the middle wing was a 200-foot (61 m) tall clock tower with the "Singer" name clearly displayed for all to see for miles around. A total of 2.75 miles (4.43 km) of railway lines were laid throughout the factory to connect the different departments such as the boiler room, foundry, shipping and the lines to main railway stations. Sir Robert McAlpine was the building contractor and the factory was designed to be fire proof with water sprinklers, making it the most modern factory in Europe at that time.

With nearly a million square feet of space and almost 7,000 employees, it was possible to produce on average 13,000 machines a week, making it the largest sewing machine factory in the world. The Clydebank factory was so productive that in 1905, the U.S. Singer Company set up and registered the Singer Manufacturing Company Ltd. in the United Kingdom. Demand continued to exceed production, so each building was extended upwards to 6 storeys high. A railway station with the company name was established in 1907 with connections to adjoining towns and central Glasgow to assist in transporting the workforce to the facility. Increased productivity came from 'scientific management' techniques which increased workloads whilst keeping salary overheads low, and in 1911, a mass walk out of 10,000 workers, the 'Singer Strike', took place in support of twelve women polishers, who had seen three staff dismissed, but the workload remained the same with no extra pay. It was significant in its recognition of the rights of women workers and 'collective bargaining' and predated the labour movement known as 'Red Clydeside'. A centenary film was made by the BBC about the female workers who stood up to the American management.

In the First World War, sewing machine production gave way to munitions. The Singer Clydebank factory received over 5000 government contracts, and made 303 million artillery shells, shell components, fuses, and aeroplane parts, as well as grenades, rifle parts, and 361,000 horseshoes. Its labour force of 14,000 was about 70% female at war's end.

From its opening in 1884 until 1943, the Kilbowie factory produced approximately 36,000,000 sewing machines. Singer was the world leader and sold more machines than all the other makers added together. In 1913, the factory shipped 1.3 million machines. The late 1950s and 1960s saw a period of significant change at the Clydebank factory. In 1958, Singer reduced production at their main American plant and transferred 40% of this production to the Clydebank factory in a bid to reduce costs. Between 1961 and 1964, the Clydebank factory underwent a £4 million modernisation programme which saw the Clydebank factory cease the production of cast iron machines and focus on the production of aluminium machines for western markets. As part of this modernisation programme, the famous Singer Clock was demolished in 1963. At the height of its productiveness in the mid-1960s, Singer employed over 16,000 workers but by the end of that decade, compulsory redundancies were taking place and 10 years later the workforce was down to 5,000. Financial problems and lack of orders forced the world's largest sewing machine factory to close in June 1980, bringing to an end over 100 years of sewing machine production in Scotland. The complex of buildings was demolished in 1998.

An archive about the factory, the strike and the history of its business in Scotland, is regarded as a recognised collection of national significance by Museums Galleries Scotland.

Painted Singer Sewing sign in Kingston, New York

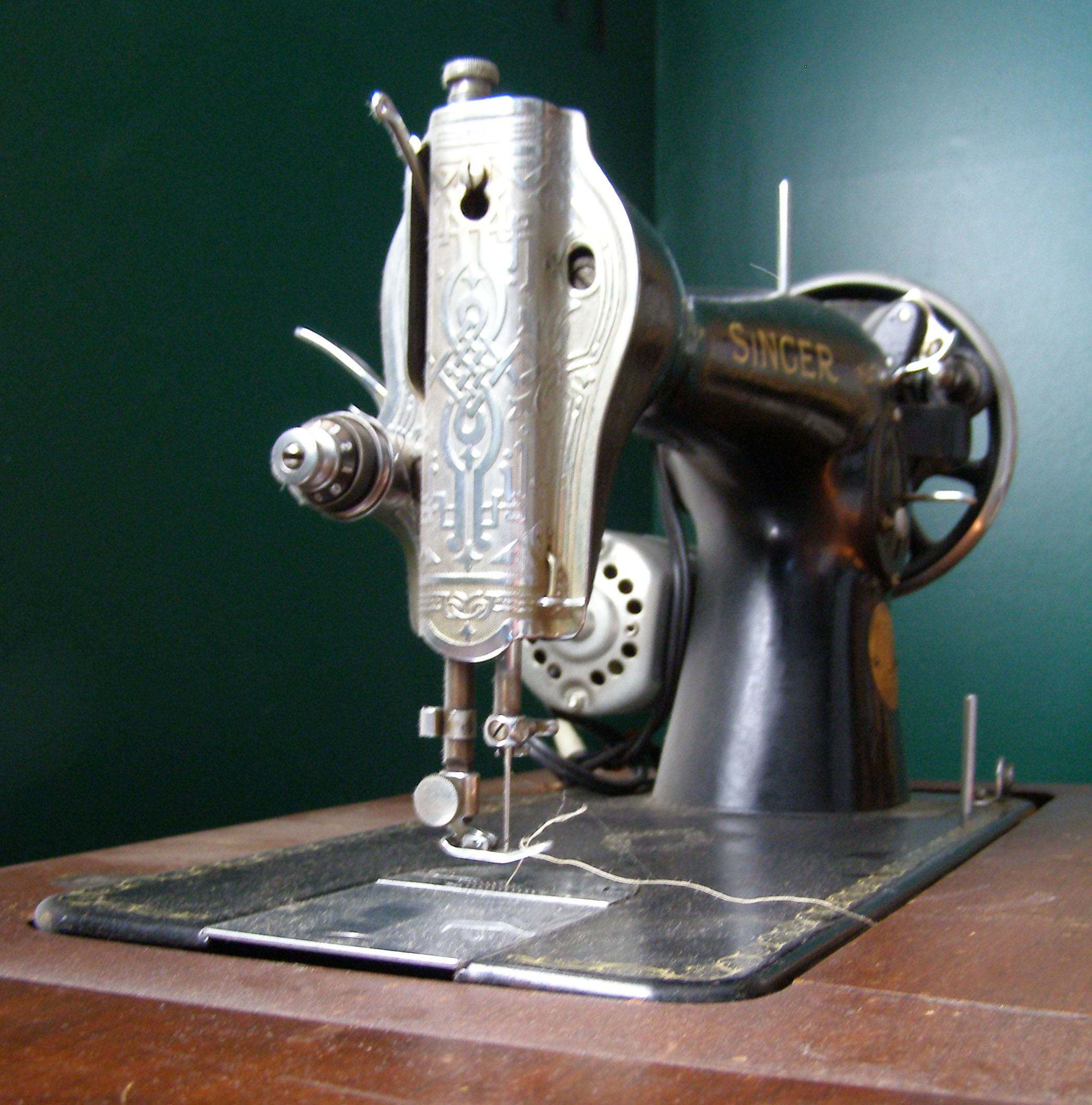
A Singer model 15 sewing machine with electric retrofit

=== Marketing before the World Wars ===
The Singer sewing machine was the first complex standardised technology to be mass marketed. It was not the first sewing machine, and its patent in 1851 led to a patent battle with Elias Howe, inventor of the lockstitch machine. This eventually resulted in a patent sharing accord among the major firms. Marketing strategies included focusing on the manufacturing industry, gender identity, credit plans, and "hire purchases."

Singer's marketing emphasized the role of women and their relationship to the home, evoking ideals of virtue, modesty, and diligence. Though the sewing machine represented liberation from arduous hand sewing, it chiefly benefited those sewing for their families and themselves. Tradespeople relying on sewing as a livelihood still suffered from poor wages, which dropped further in response to the time savings gained by machine sewing. Singer offered credit purchases and rent-to-own arrangements, allowing people to rent a machine with the rental payments applied to the eventual purchase of the machine, and sold globally through the use of direct-sales door-to-door canvassers to demonstrate and sell the machines.

=== World War II ===
During World War II, the company suspended sewing machine production to take on government contracts for weapons manufacturing. Factories in the United States supplied the American forces with Norden bomb sights and M1 Carbine rifle receivers, while factories in Germany provided their armed forces with weapons.

In 1939, the company was given a production study by the government to draw plans and develop standard raw material sizes for building M1911A1 pistols. The following April 17, Singer was given an educational order of 500 units with serial numbers S800001 – S800500. The educational order was a programme set up by the Ordnance Board in the U.S. to teach companies without gun-making experience to manufacture weapons.

Singer delivered 500 units to the U.S. government. Although Singer was unable to produce 100 guns a day, which the government contract required, the War Department was impressed with the quality of their pistols and asked the company to produce navigation and targeting equipment components. The pistol tooling and manufacturing machines were transferred to Remington Rand whilst some went to the Ithaca Gun Company. Approximately 1.75 million 1911A1 pistols were produced during World War II, making original Singer pistols relatively rare and collectable. In 2017, one sold at auction for $414,000.

In December 1940, Singer won a contract to produce the M5 Antiaircraft Director, a version of the UK-designed Kerrison Predictor. The US Army had previously adopted the M7 Computing Sight for their 37 mm gun M1 anti-aircraft guns, but the gun proved temperamental and Sperry Corporation was too busy producing other systems to build the required number of M7's. After testing in September 1940, the Army accepted the Kerrison as the M5, and later, the Bofors 40 mm gun in place of the M1.

=== Post-war ===
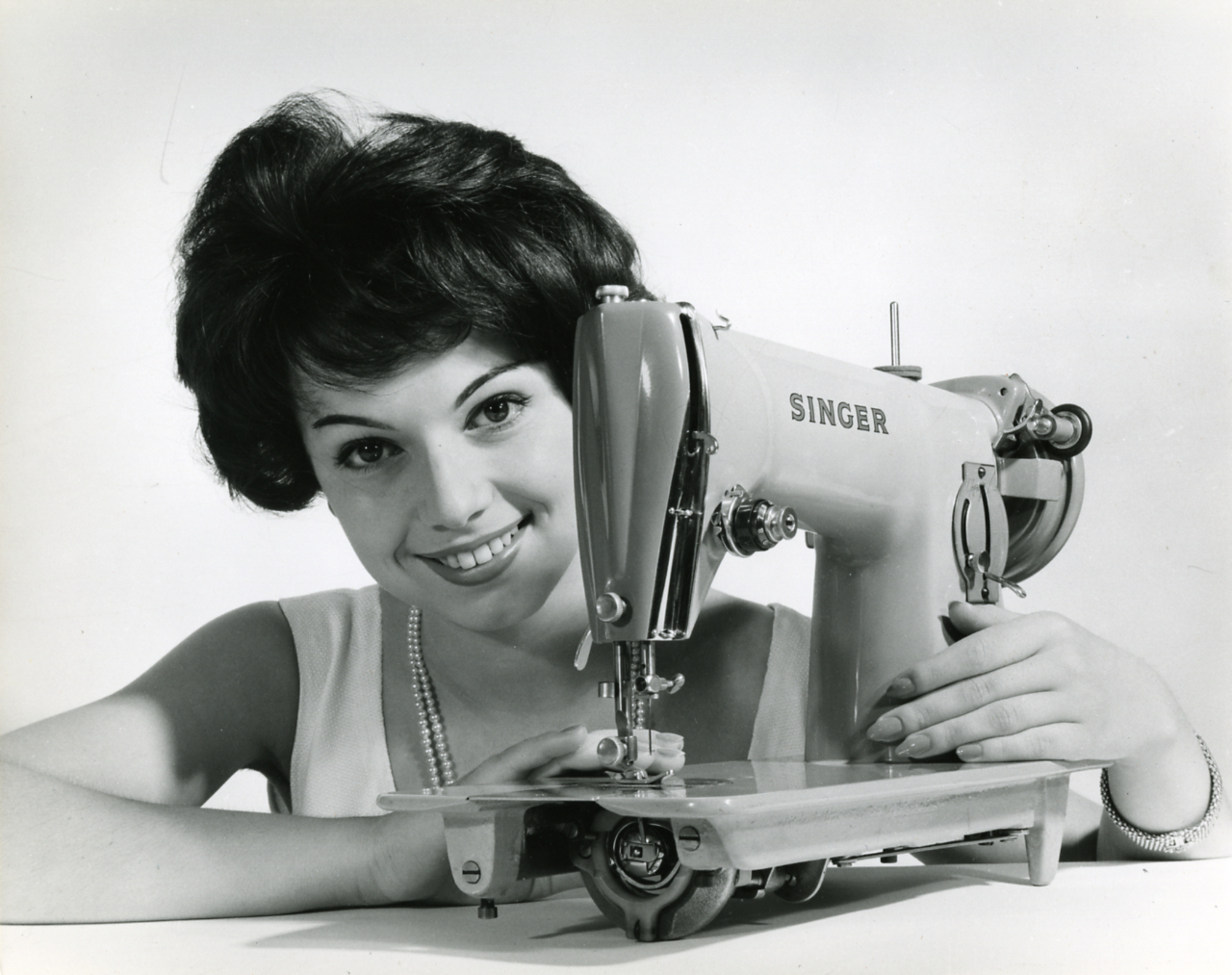
Advertising photograph by Paolo Monti, Milan 1963. The machine is a model 191.

Singer resumed developing sewing machines in 1946. They introduced one of their most popular, highest-quality and fully-optioned machines in 1957, the 401 Slant-o-Matic.

In the late 1960s and early 1970s, Singer sponsored rock and roll concerts to help advertise a variety of products including a line of Singer record players. The 1971 concert series was broadcast by WPLJ New York from the A&R Recording Studios and included the Paul Butterfield Blues Band, Seatrain, Procol Harum, Incredible String Band, Mother Earth, and Delaney & Bonnie and Friends. In 1968, Singer sponsored "Singer Presents ... Elvis", commonly referred to as the '68 Comeback Special.

=== Diversification ===
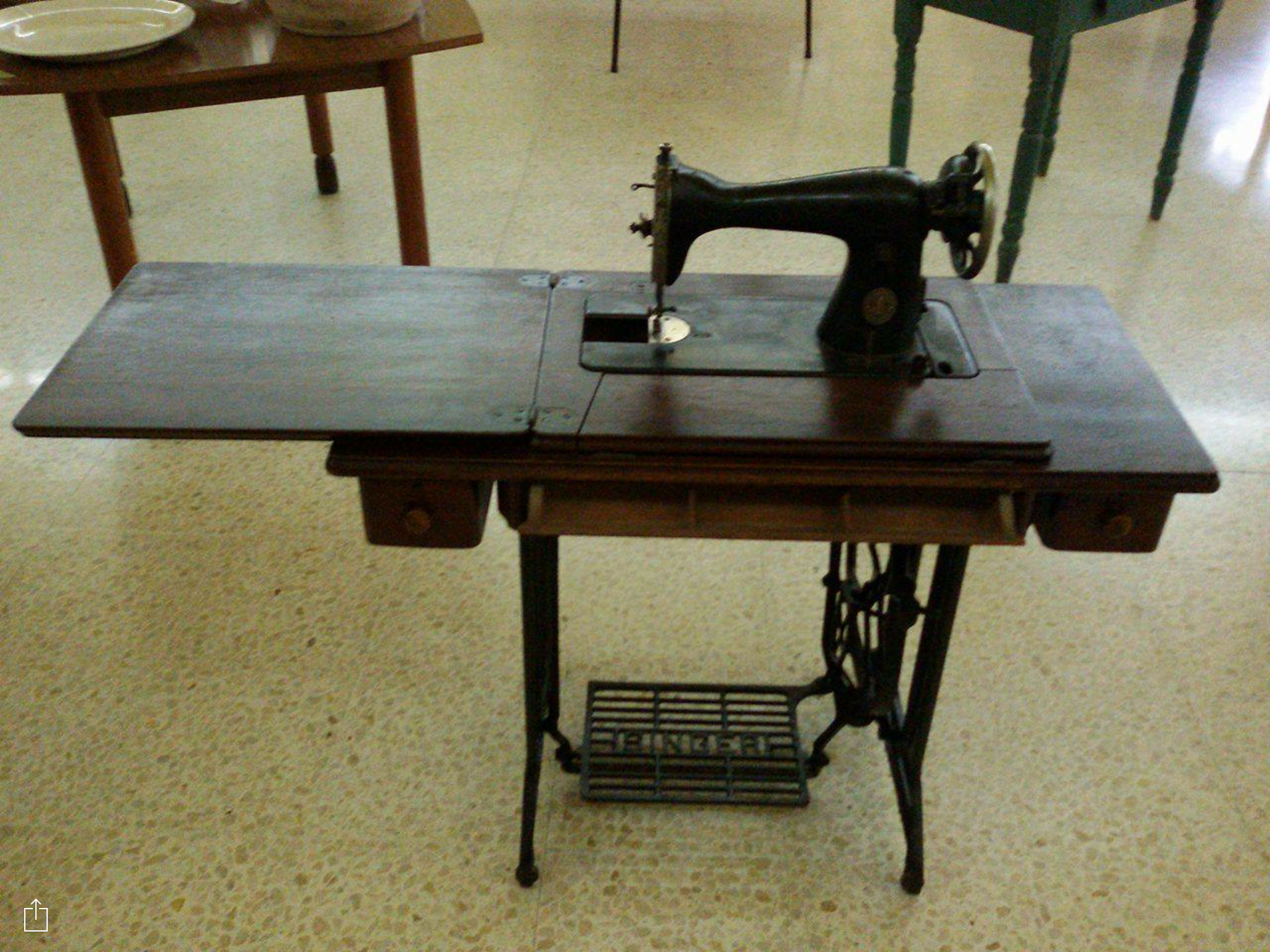
Singer in Malta

Sales and profits grew until the 1940s. The market was affected in several ways. The US market matured after WWII. European and Japanese manufacturers ate into the market with zig-zag sewing machines. Under the leadership of Donald P. Kircher, Singer diversified into markets such as office equipment, defense, and aerospace. While 90% of Singer's revenue was from sewing machines before diversification, this was reduced to 35% after the change.

In the 1960s, the company diversified, acquiring the Friden calculator company in 1965 and General Precision Equipment Corporation in 1968 for over $400m. GPE included Librascope, The Kearfott Company, Inc, and Link Flight Simulation. In 1968 also, Singer bought out GPS Systems and added it to the Link Simulations Systems Division (LSSD). This unit produced nuclear power plant control room simulators in Silver Spring, Maryland: Tech Road building for Boiling Water Reactor (BWR), Parkway building for Pressurized Water Reactor (PWR) and later moved to Broken Land Parkway in Columbia, Maryland while flight simulators were produced in Binghamton, New York.

Friden became Singer Business Machines which produced the Singer System 10. In January 1976, Singer announced its withdrawal from the data processing market, offering the division to other companies. In March 1976, TRW Inc. and Singer announced an agreement whereby TRW would assume "managerial responsibilities" for Singer's System 10 and point-of-sale products, perceived as a way for TRW to expand its market presence. Maintenance and customer support for Singer's products were transferred to TRW, accompanied by a pledge for TRW to continue manufacturing at Singer's Cogar facility in Utica, New York. Concurrently with these arrangements, ICL assumed the corresponding "management responsibilities" to Singer's international operations and acquired the rights to products marketed internationally, including the System 10. ICL would later acquire the Cogar subsidiary and its manufacturing facility, continuing to manufacture the System 10 for its own customers. Despite Singer's original announcement, its international operations continued to win orders and show signs of profitability. As some existing Singer customers contemplated legal action against the company for failing to fulfil its obligations, ICL sought to expand its US presence, attracting new business for both its own products as well as those acquired from Singer.

By 1971 Singer was also producing portable/home audio/visual equipment. In order to support this venture, Singer sponsored concerts such as the 1971 A&R Studio concerts on WPLJ-New York mentioned above.

For several years in the 1970s, Singer set up a national sales force for CAT phototypesetting machines (of UNIX troff fame) made by another Massachusetts company, Graphic Systems Inc. This division was purchased by Wang Laboratories in 1978.

=== Late 20th century ===
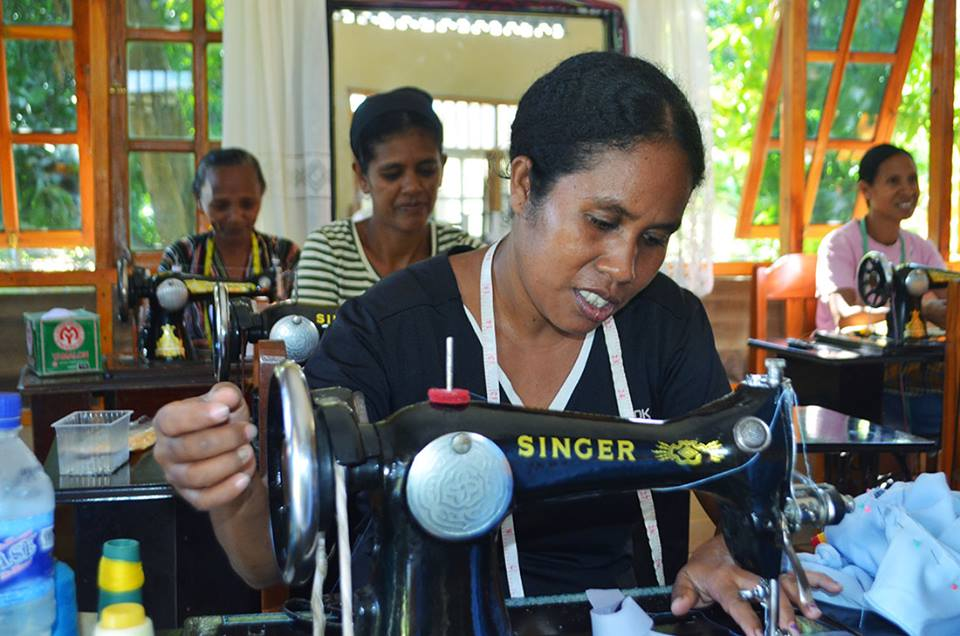
Woman with Singer sewing machine in East Timor (2017)

In 1978 Singer moved its HQ from Rockefeller Plaza to Stamford, Connecticut. 430 jobs were moved to the new location.

During the 1980s Singer sewing machine markets were being hit with Japanese machines and European brands including Bernina, Pfaff, and Viking. In 1986 Singer purchased Dalmo Victor for $174m from Textron, It would subsequently be resold in 1989 for $175m in cash to General Instrument. The original Singer company announced in July 1986 that it would be spinning off its sewing machine business under the name SSMC Ltd.

In 1987, corporate raider Paul Bilzerian made a "greenmail" run at Singer, and ended up owning the company when no "white knight" rescuer appeared. To recover his money, Bilzerian sold off parts of the company. Kearfott was split. The Kearfott Guidance & Navigation Corporation was sold to the Astronautics Corporation of America in 1988, and the Electronic Systems Division was purchased by the Plessey Company in 1988 and renamed Plessey Electronic Systems (and then acquired by GEC-Marconi in 1990, renamed GEC-Marconi Electronic Systems, and later incorporated into BAE Systems). The four Link divisions developing and supporting industrial and flight simulation were sold to Canadian Avionics Electronics (CAE) and became CAE-Link. The nuclear power simulator division became S3 Technologies, and later GSE Systems, and relocated to Eldersburg, Maryland. The Sewing Machine Division was sold in 1989 to Semi-Tech Microelectronics, a publicly traded Toronto-based company.

In 1989 Semi-Tech Global purchased SSMC along with the rights to the Singer name, allowing for the renaming of SSMC back to Singer. As a result the former Singer Corporation was renamed to Bicoastal Corporation. Semi-Tech Global incorporated Singer (former SSMC Ltd.) into Singer N.V., based in the Netherlands Antilles, owned by the Hong Kong holding company.

=== Kohlberg & Company ===
Singer N.V. filed for bankruptcy in 1999, and was acquired by Kohlberg & Company. In 1997, Singer (Singer N.V.) US operations moved its consumer products to LaVergne, Tennessee. This location also served its wholesale distribution of sewing machines and parts.

In 2006 the parent company of Singer, Kohlberg & Company, acquired the Husqvarna and Pfaff brands. This merged the three brands into the current company, the SVP Group. Its main competitors are Baby Lock, Bernina, Brother, Janome, Juki and Aisin Seiki.

In 2017, the company launched their new Singer Sewing Assistant App.

In 2018, a large factory fire destroyed a Singer distribution office and warehouse in Seven Hills, Sydney. Singer had manufactured sewing machines in Australia at a purpose-built plant in the western Sydney suburb of Penrith, from 1959 until 1967.

== Singer buildings ==
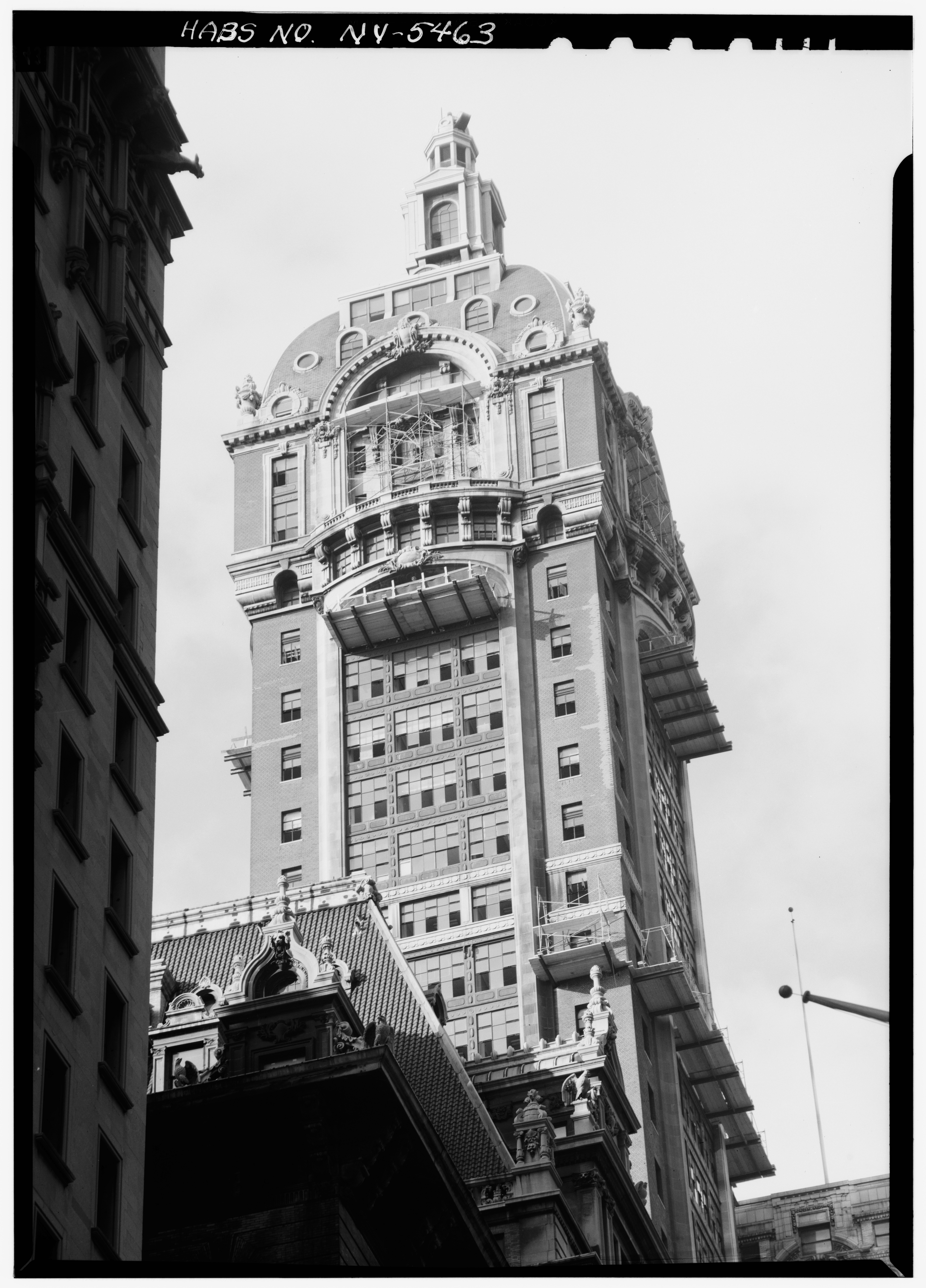
The tower of the former Singer Building in New York City, the tallest in the world at the time of its construction

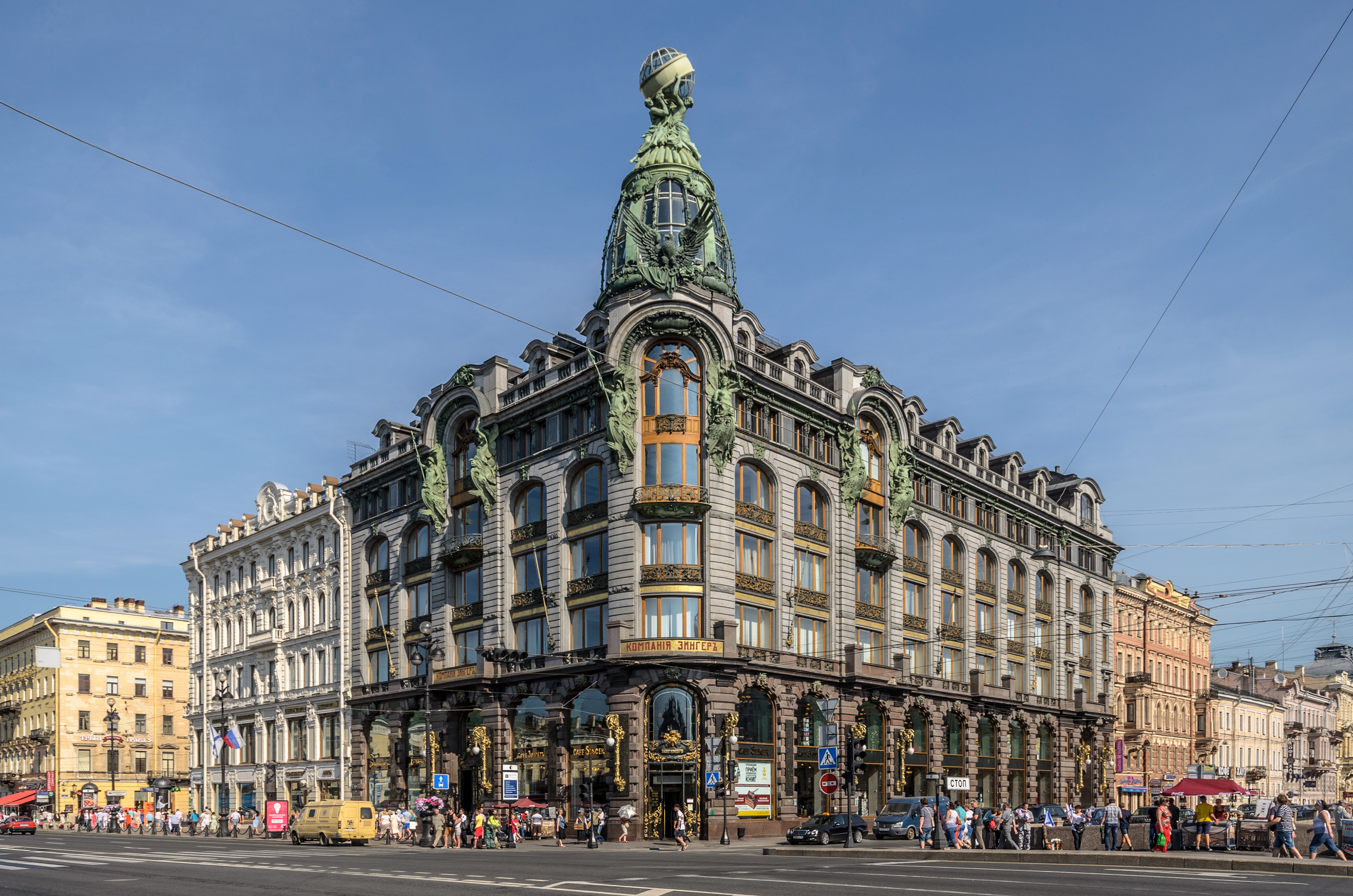
Singer House in Saint Petersburg, Russia

Singer was heavily involved in New York City real estate in the 1800s through Edward C. Clark, a founder of the company. Clark had built The Dakota apartments and other New York buildings in the 1880s. In 1900, the Singer company retained Ernest Flagg to build a 12-story loft building at Broadway and Prince Street in Lower Manhattan. The building is now considered architecturally notable, and it has been restored.

The 47-story Singer Building, completed in 1908, was also designed by Flagg, who designed two landmark residences for Bourne. Constructed during Bourne's tenure, the Singer Building (demolished in 1968 for the One Liberty Plaza development) was then the tallest building in the world and was the tallest building to be intentionally demolished until the Twin Towers of the World Trade Center were destroyed in the September 11 attacks.

At their Clydebank factory, Singer built a 200 feet (61 m) clock tower, which stood over the central wing and had the reputation of being the largest four-faced clock in the world. Each face weighed five tons, and it took four men fifteen minutes twice a week to keep it wound. The tower was demolished in 1963, and the factory itself was closed in 1980. Singer railway station, built to serve the factory, is only one of two railway stations in the UK named after a factory, and is still in operation today.

The famous Singer House, designed by architect Pavel Suzor, was built in 1902–1904 at Nevsky Prospekt in Saint Petersburg as headquarters of the Russian branch of the company. This modern style building (situated just opposite the Kazan Cathedral) is officially recognised as an object of Russian historical-cultural heritage.

== List of company presidents ==
- Isaac M. Singer (1851–1863)
- Inslee Hopper (1863–1875)
- Edward C. Clark (1875–1882)
- George Ross McKenzie (1882–1889)
- Frederick Gilbert Bourne (1889–1905)
- Sir Douglas Alexander (1905–1949)
- Milton C. Lightner (1949–1958)
- Donald P. Kircher (1958–1975)
- Joseph Bernard Flavin (1975–1987)
- Paul Bilzerian (1988–1989)
- Iftikhar Ahmed (1989–1997)
- Stephen H. Goodman (1998–2004)

== Popular domestic Singer sewing machines ==
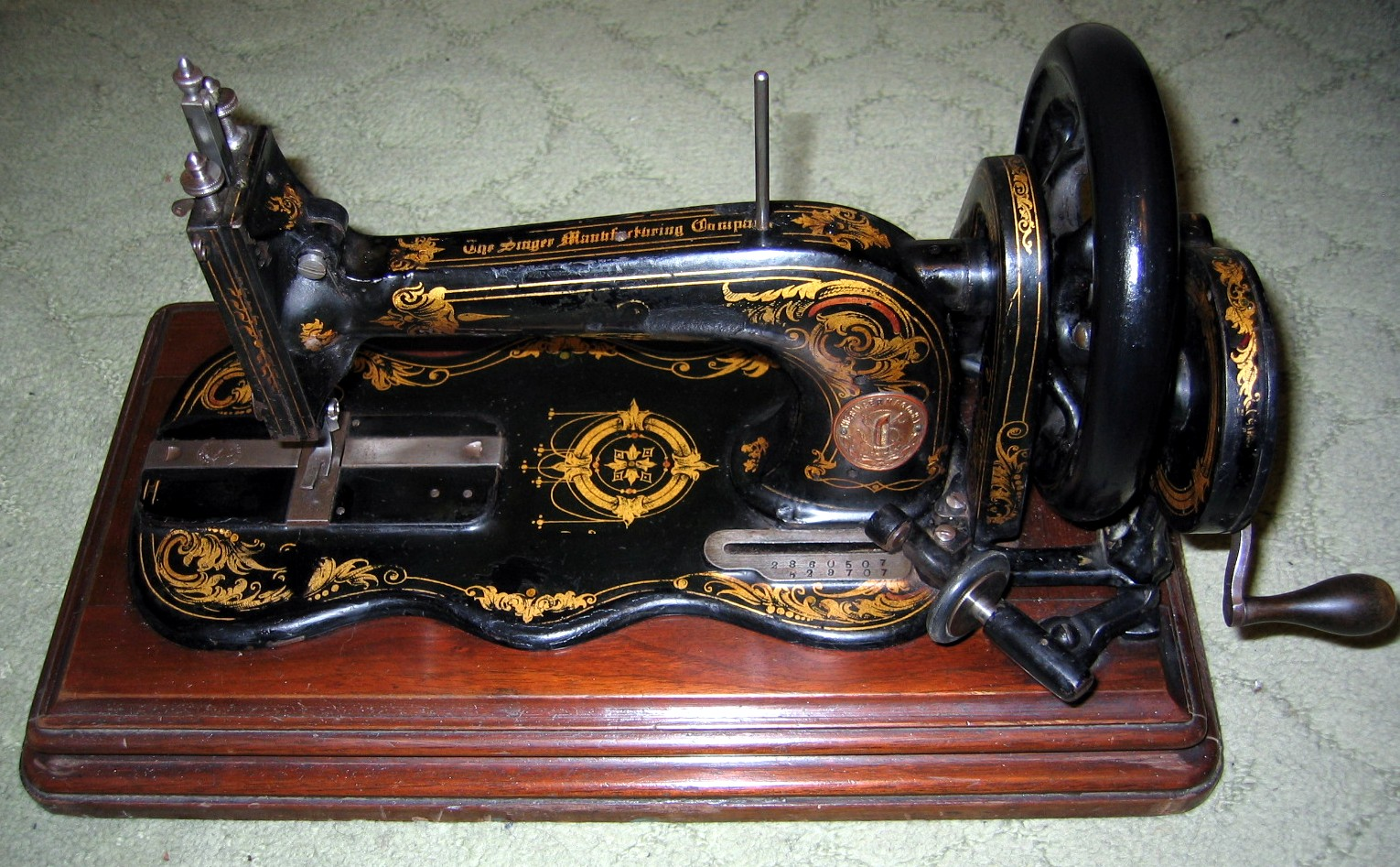
A Singer model 12K fiddle-bed from 1878

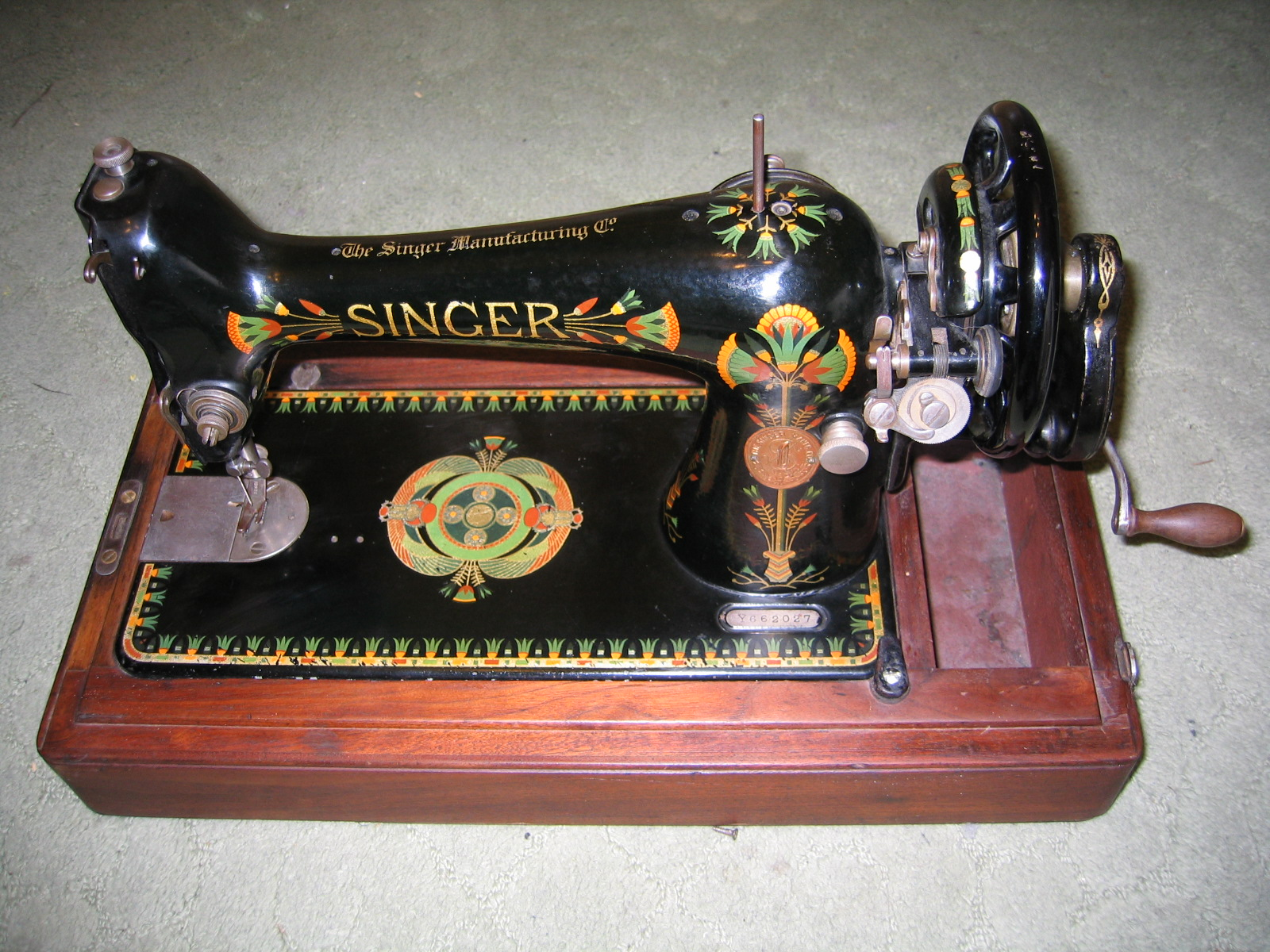
A Singer model 66 with Lotus decals from 1922

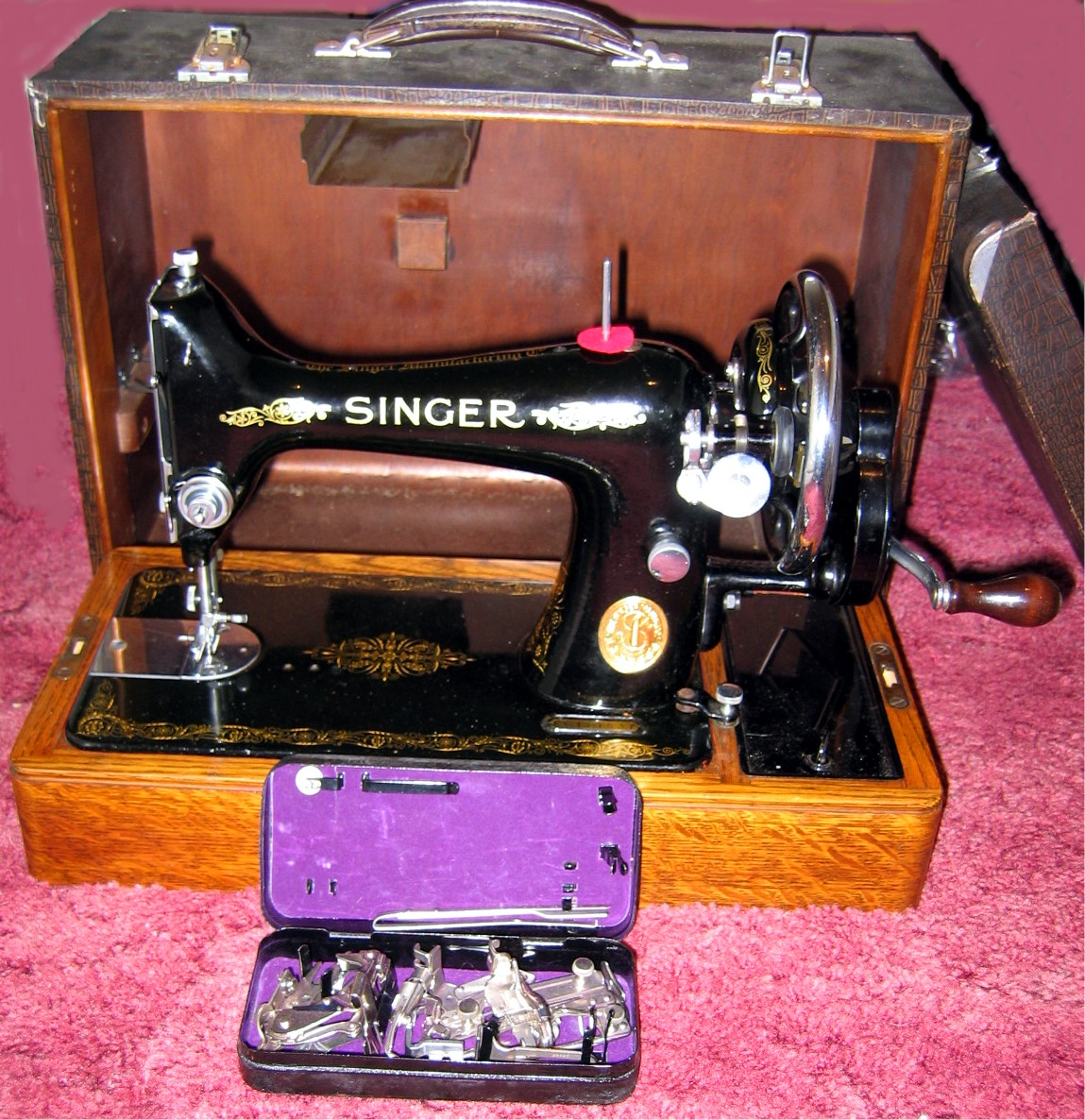
A Singer model 99 from 1939

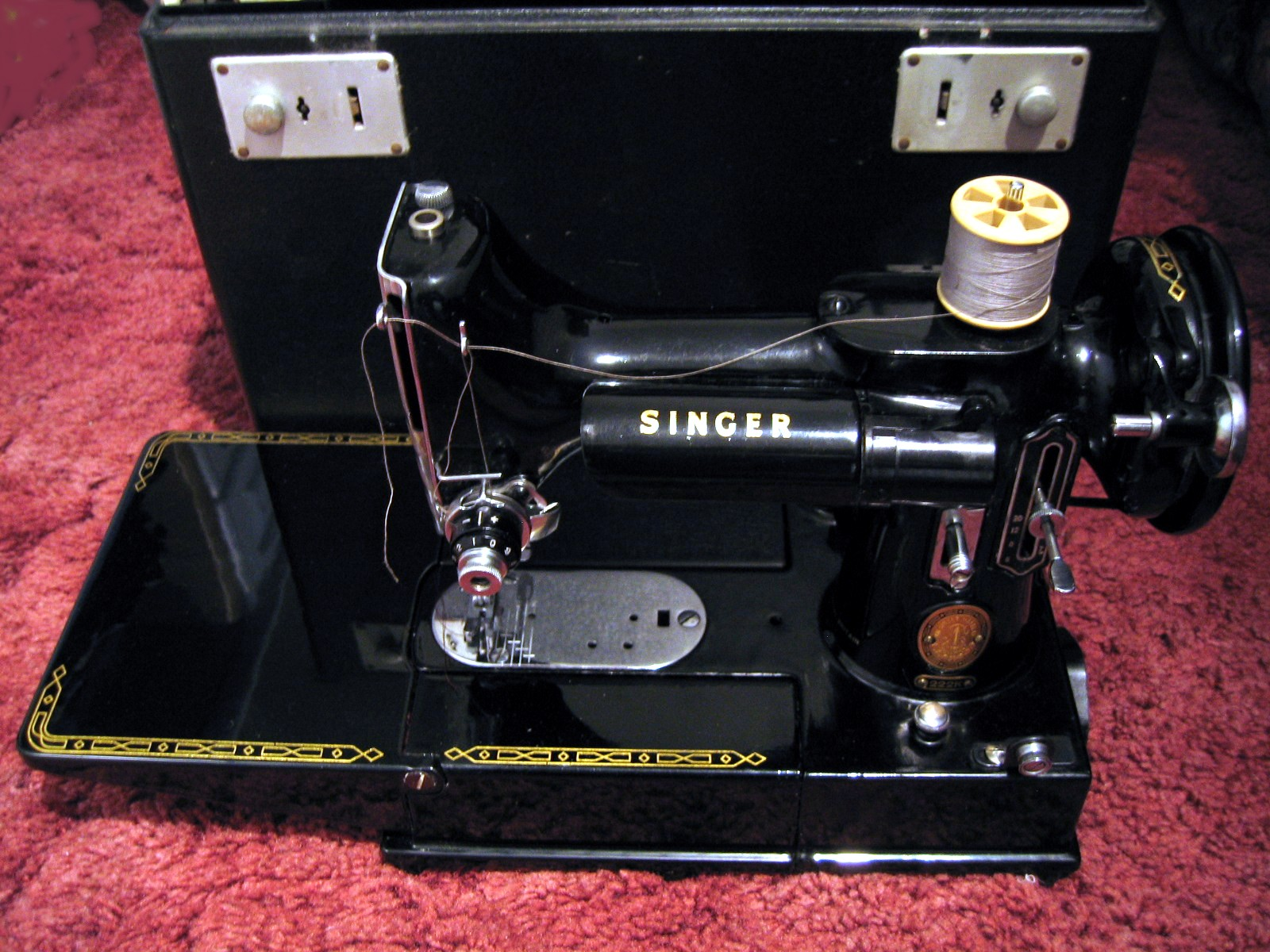
A Singer Featherweight model 222k from 1954

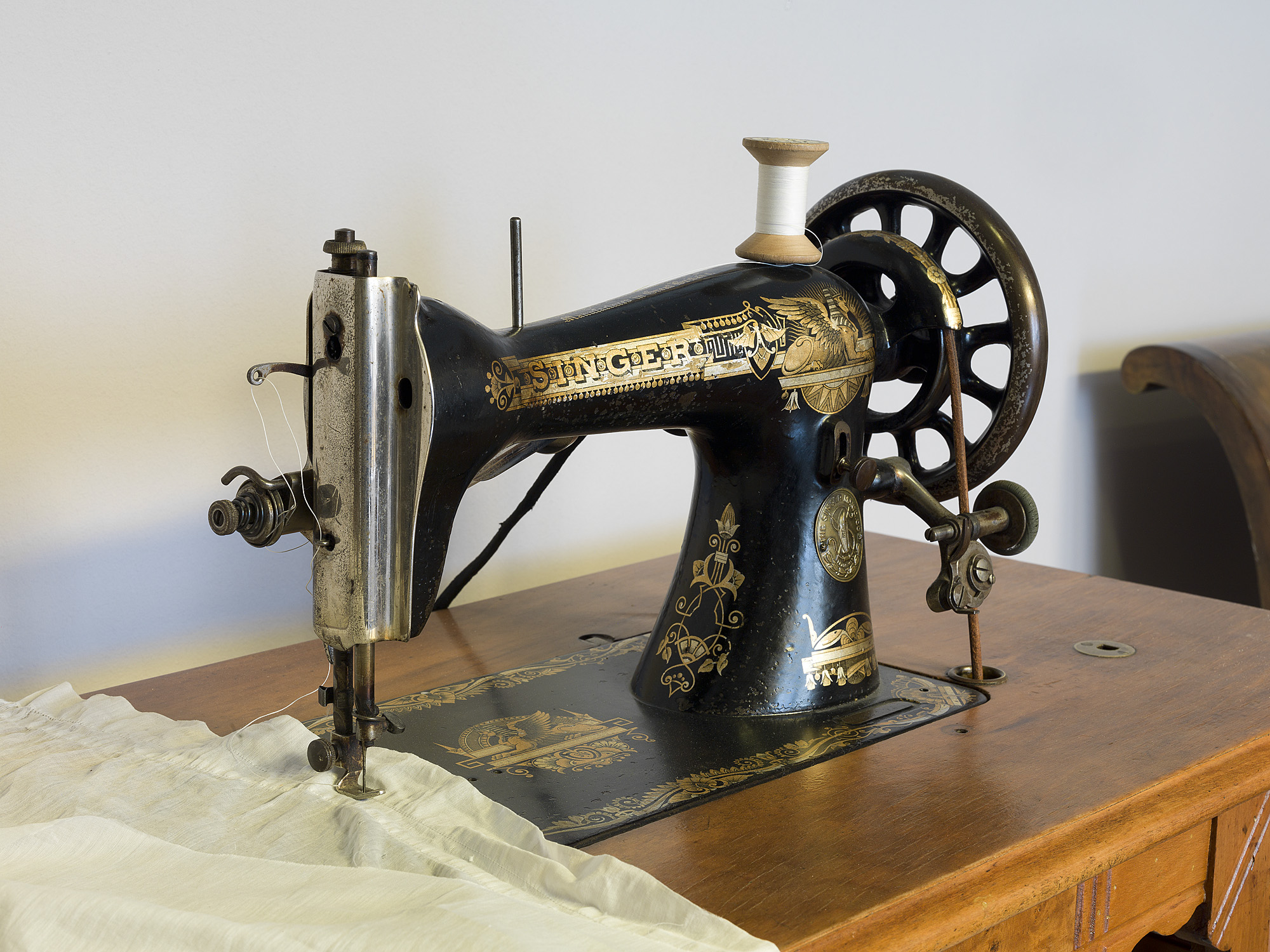
A Singer model 15. This was one of Singer's longest-running production models.

== See also ==
- History of the sewing machine
- List of sewing machine brands
