= Overlock =

Type of multi-thread stitch

The purl stitch.

An overlock is a kind of stitch that sews over the edge of one or two pieces of cloth for edging, hemming, or seaming. Usually an overlock sewing machine will cut the edges of the cloth as they are fed through (such machines being called sergers in North America), though some are made without cutters. The inclusion of automated cutters allows overlock machines to create finished seams easily and quickly. An overlock sewing machine differs from a lockstitch sewing machine in that it uses loopers fed by multiple thread cones rather than a bobbin. Loopers serve to create thread loops that pass from the needle thread to the edges of the fabric so that the edges of the fabric are contained within the seam.

Overlock sewing machines usually run at high speeds, from 1000 to 9000 rpm, and most are used in industry for edging, hemming and seaming a variety of fabrics and products. Overlock stitches are extremely versatile, as they can be used for decoration, reinforcement, or construction.

Overlocking is also referred to as "overedging", "merrowing", or "serging". Though "serging" technically refers to overlocking with cutters, in practice the four terms are used interchangeably.

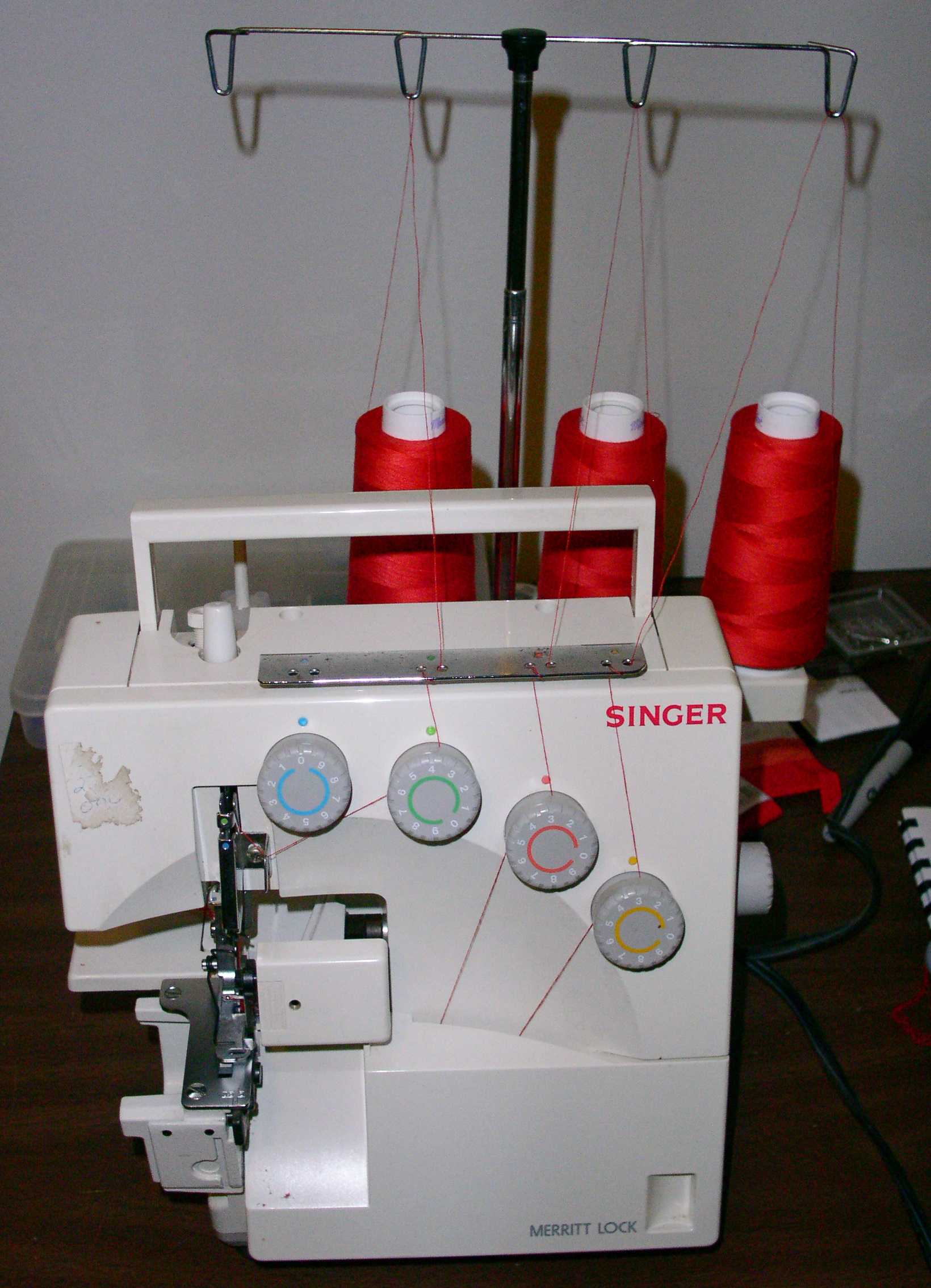
An overlock machine.

== History ==
Overlock stitching was invented by the Merrow Machine Company in 1881.

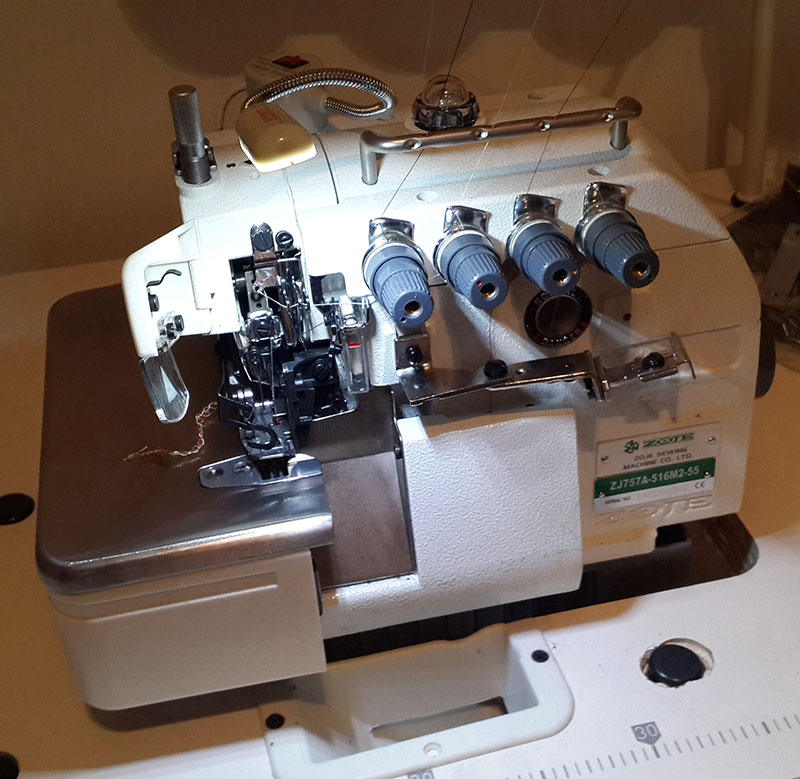
A Zoje 5 cone industrial overlocker

J. Makens Merrow and his son Joseph Merrow, who owned a knitting mill established in Connecticut in 1838, developed a number of technological advancements to be used in the mill's operations. Merrow's first patent was a machine for crochet stitching, and the Merrow Machine Company still produces crochet machines based on this original model. This technology was a starting point for the development of the overlock machine, patented by Joseph Merrow in 1889. Unlike standard lockstitching, which uses a bobbin, overlock sewing machines utilize loopers to create thread loops for the needle to pass through, in a manner similar to crocheting. Merrow's original three-thread overedge sewing machine is the forerunner of contemporary overlocking machines. Over time, the Merrow Machine Company pioneered the design of new machines to create a variety of overlock stitches, such as two- and four-thread machines, the one-thread butted seam, and the cutterless emblem edger.

A landmark lawsuit between Willcox & Gibbs and the Merrow Machine Company in 1905 established the ownership and rights to the early mechanical development of overlocking to the Merrow Machine Company.

Throughout the early 20th century, areas of Connecticut and New York were the centres of textile manufacturing and machine production in the United States. Consequently, many overlock machine companies established themselves in the Northeastern United States.

In 1964 several engineers and managers at one Japanese manufacturer redesigned the industrial serger they were currently manufacturing as a smaller, lighter model intended for home use. They presented their concept to their employer, and after it was rejected they quit and formed the Juki Corporation.

Nick Tacony, founder of Tacony Corporation, introduced machinery for producing the overlock stitch (so called "baby lock") to the United States market. This allowed sewing enthusiasts to produce clothing with finishing seams like those made by industrial garment manufacturers.

== Terminology ==
In the United States, the term "overlocker" has largely been replaced by "serger". However, in other parts of the world such as Australia and the UK, the term "overlocker" is still in use.

== Types ==
Overlock stitches are classified in a number of ways. The most basic classification is by the number of threads used in the stitch. Industrial overlock machines are generally made in 1, 2, 3, 4, or 5 thread formations. Each of these formations has unique uses and benefits:

- 1-thread: End-to-end seaming or "butt-seaming" of piece goods for textile finishing.
- 2-thread: Edging and seaming, especially on knits and wovens, finishing seam edges, stitching flatlock seams, stitching elastic and lace to lingerie, and hemming. This is the most common type of overlock stitch.
- 3-thread: Sewing pintucks, creating narrow rolled hems, finishing fabric edges, decorative edging, and seaming knit or woven fabrics.
- 4-thread: Decorative edging and finishing, seaming high-stress areas, mock safety stitches which create extra strength while retaining flexibility.
- 5-thread: In apparel manufacturing, safety stitches utilizing two needles create a very strong seam.

Two- and three-thread formations are also known as "merrowing" after the Merrow Machine Company.

Additional variables in the types of overlock stitches are the stitch eccentric, and the stitch width. The stitch eccentric indicates how many stitches per inch there are, which is adjustable and can vary widely within one machine. Different stitch eccentrics create more or less dense and solid-looking edges. The stitch width indicates how wide the stitch is from the edge of the fabric. Lightweight fabrics often require a wider stitch to prevent pulling.

Adding extra variation in stitch types is the differential feed feature, which allows feed to be adjusted; extra-fast feed creates a ruffled or "lettuce-leaf" effect. Finally, some merrowing machines contain parts to roll the fabric edge into the stitch for added durability.

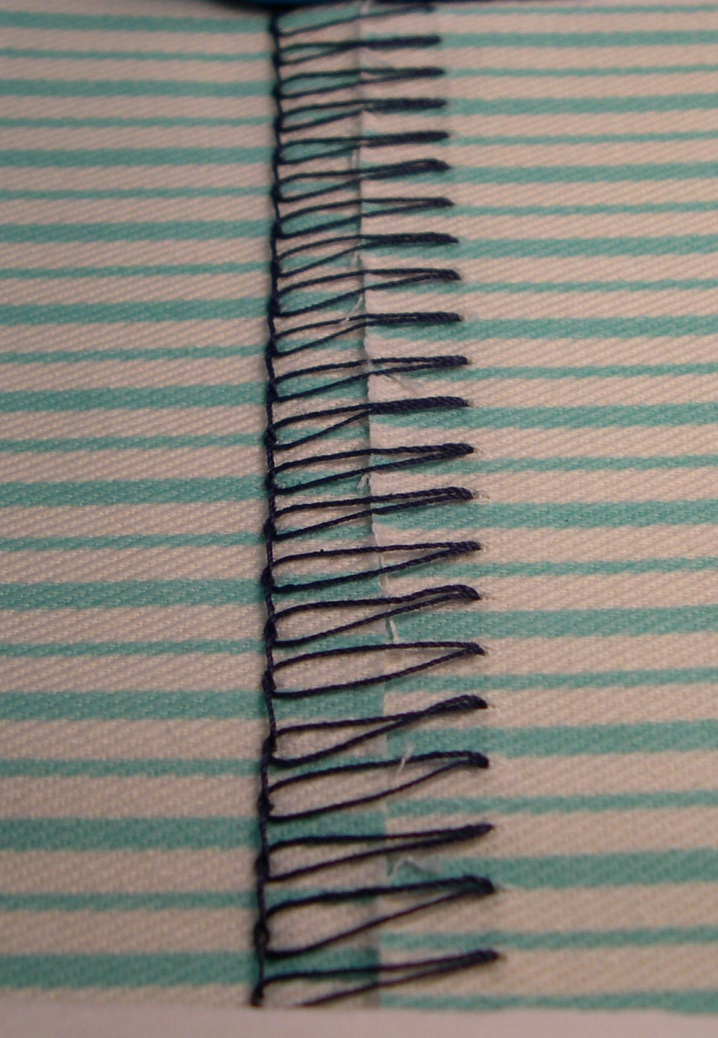
1-thread, 5/8 in (16 mm) wide, 12 stitches per inch (2.1 mm stitch pitch)

2-thread, 1/8 in (3.2 mm) wide, 20 stitches per inch (1.3 mm stitch pitch), with differential feed

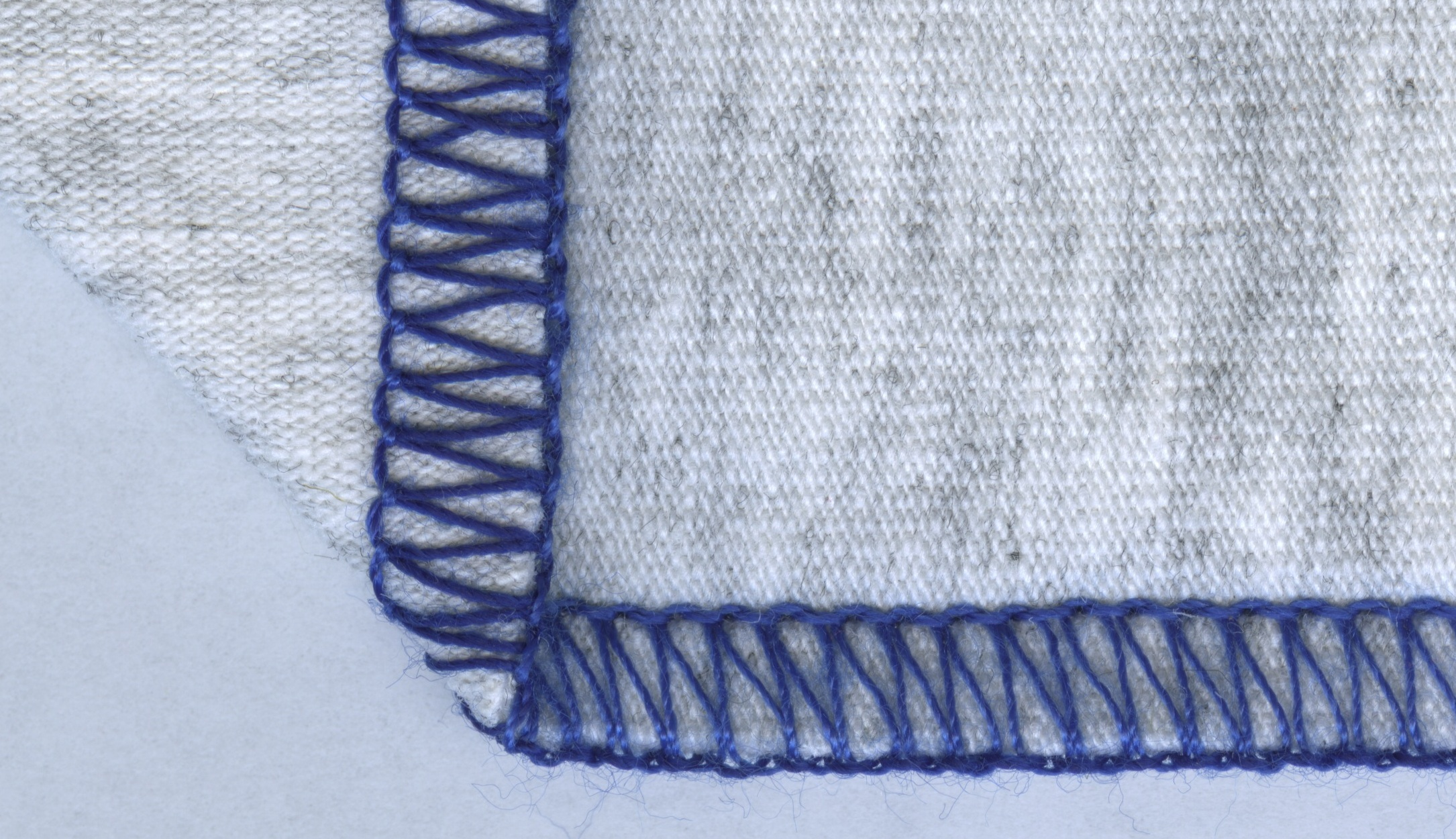
3-thread, 5/32 in (4.0 mm) wide, 17 stitches per inch (1.5 mm stitch pitch)

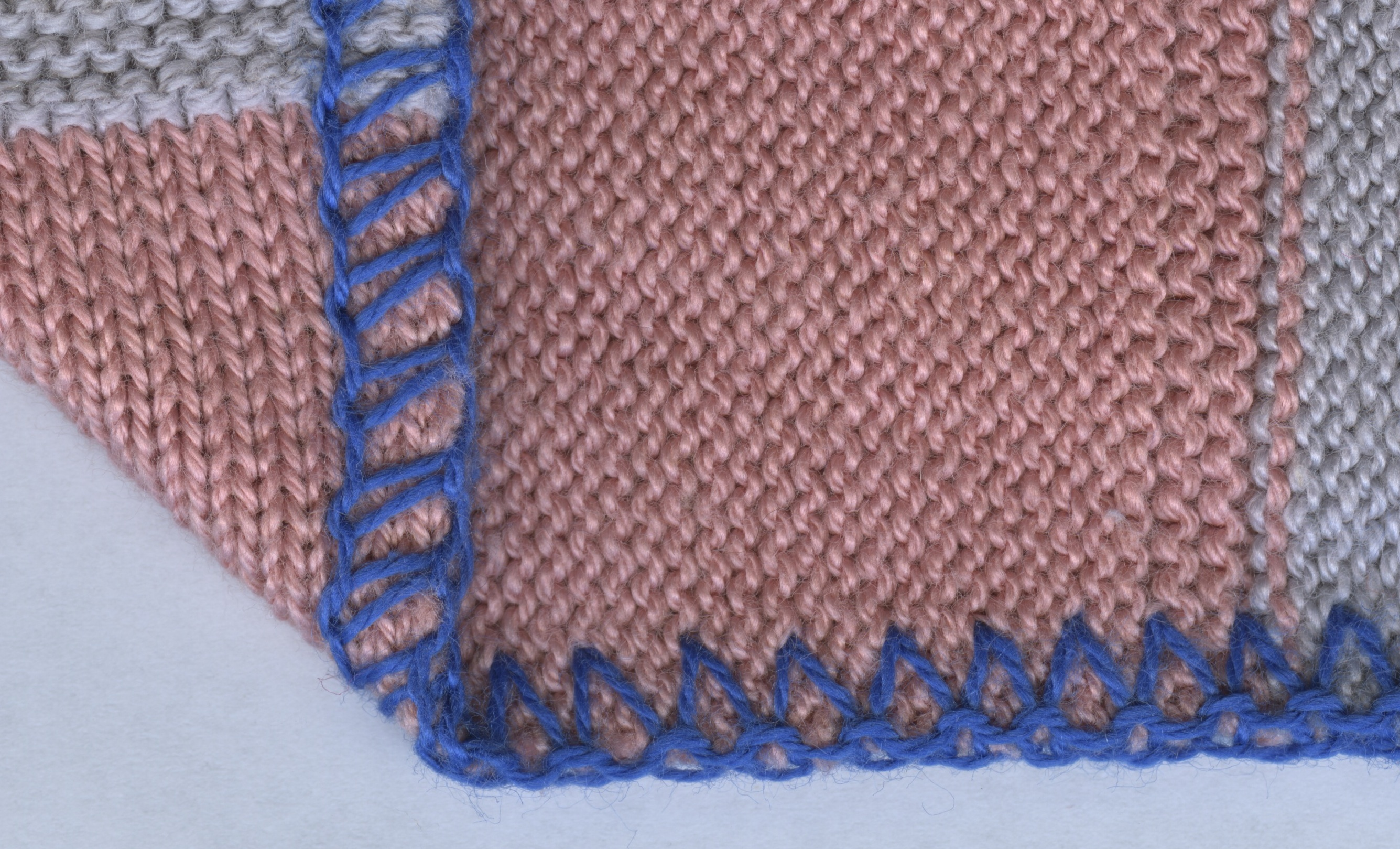
3-thread, 1/4 in (6.4 mm) wide, 7 stitches per inch (3.6 mm stitch pitch)

== Formation ==

1. When the needle enters the fabric, a loop is formed in the thread at the back of the needle.
2. As the needle continues its downward motion into the fabric, the lower looper begins its movement from left to right. The tip of the lower looper passes behind the needle and through the loop of thread that has formed behind the needle.
3. The lower looper continues along its path moving toward the right of the serger. As it moves, the lower thread is carried through the needle thread.
4. While the lower looper is moving from left to right, the upper looper advances from right to left. The tip of the upper looper passes behind the lower looper and picks up the lower looper thread and needle thread.
5. The lower looper now begins its move back into the far left position. As the upper looper continues to the left, it holds the lower looper thread and needle thread in place.
6. The needle again begins its downward path passing behind the upper looper and securing the upper looper thread (the needle goes between the metal and the thread) . This completes the overlock stitch formation and begins the stitch cycle all over again.

== Uses ==
Overlock stitches are traditionally used for edging and light seaming. Other applications include:

- Sewing netting
- Butt-seaming is used for joining the ends of piece goods.
- Flat-locking
- Edging emblems
- Purl stitching
- Rolled hemming
- Decorative edging

== See also ==
- Lockstitch
