= Juki =

Japanese sewing and pick and place machine manufacturer

Juki Corporation
- Logo used since 1988

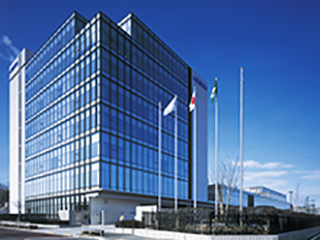
- Headquarters in Tama, Tokyo
- Trade name: JUKI
- Native name: JUKI 株式会社
- Romanized name: Juki Kabushiki-gaisha
- Formerly: Tokyo Juki Manufacturers Association (1938-1943); Tokyo Juki Industrial Company, Ltd. (1943-1988)
- Company type: Public KK
- Traded as: TYO: 6440
- Industry: Machinery
- Founded: December 15, 1938; 87 years ago (brand); December 1943; 82 years ago (company)
- Headquarters: Tsurumaki, Tama, Tokyo, Japan
- Key people: Atsushi Narikawa (Representative Director and President)
- Products: Industrial and household sewing machines; SMT assembly solutions and systems
- Revenue: ▲JPY 95.2 billion (FY 2024)
- Net income: ▲JPY 3.2 billion (FY 2024)
- Number of employees: 4,621 (consolidated, as of December 31, 2024)
- Divisions: Juki Jin
- Website: Official

Juki Corporation (JUKI 株式会社, Juki Kabushiki-gaisha; stylized as JUKI) is a Japanese multinational manufacturer of industrial sewing machines and domestic sewing machines, as well as high-technology SMT (surface mount technology) assembly equipment and is headquartered in Tama-shi, Tokyo. It is one of the leading industrial machine manufacturers. JUKI used to rank as the largest industrial sewing machine manufacturer in the world.

Headquartered in Japan, the company currently has manufacturing facilities in Japan, China, and Vietnam, and markets its products on six continents, in about 170 countries.

Until 1988, the company was known as Tokyo Juki Industrial Company, Ltd. The company motto, which doubles as a customer creed, is "Mind & Technology" (as in "emotionally accessible technology")

== Production ==
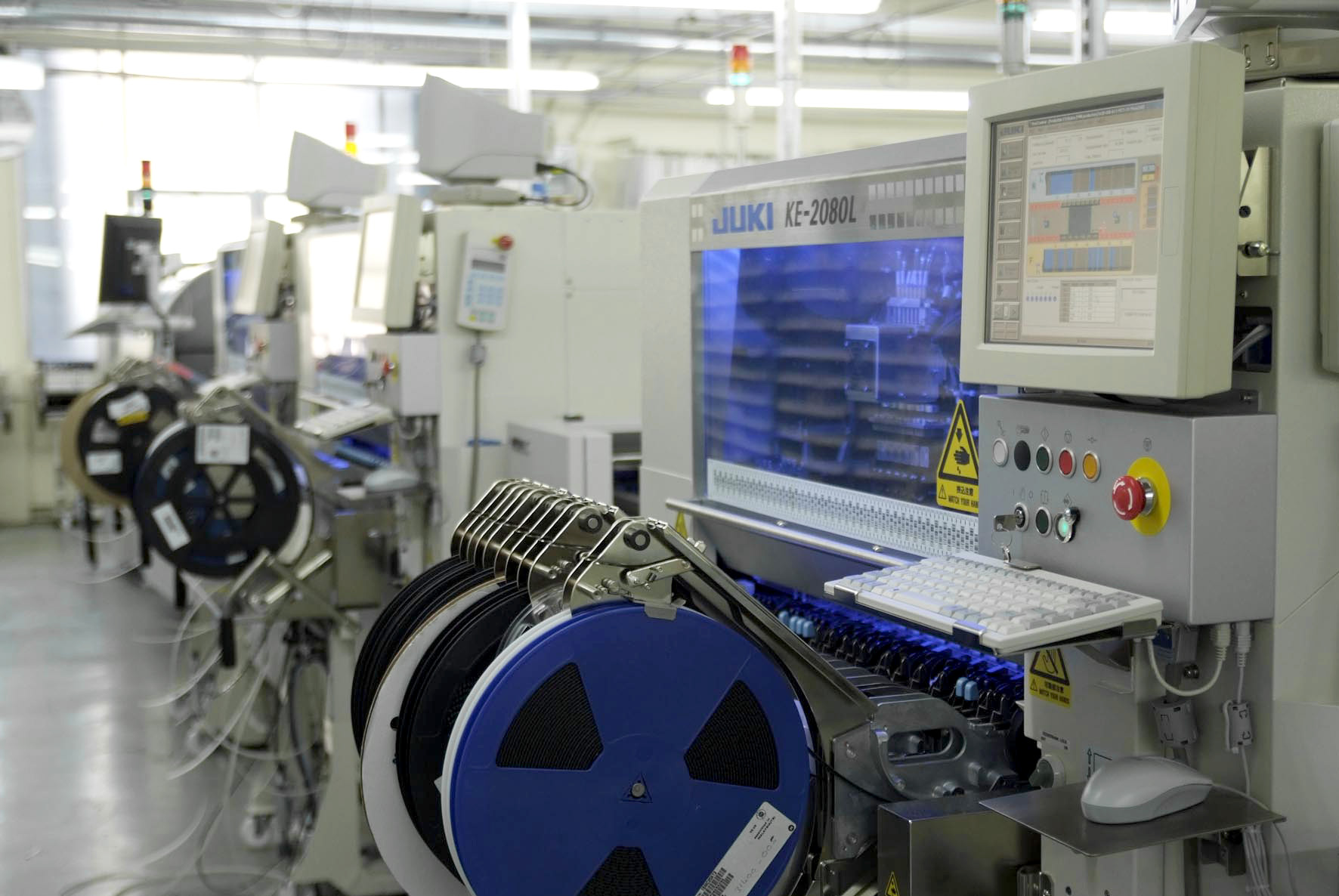
A JUKI SMT placement machine

The company produces sewing machines for the home or hobbyist market as well as various machines for the textile industry.

In February 2013, Juki and Sony Corp. entered negotiations to discuss a merger of their SMT equipment businesses. Since then, JUKI Corporation has successfully established themselves in the area of SMT assembly equipment around the world, with dedicated sales and service entities in key markets, such as Europe through JUKI Automation Systems GmbH, headquartered in Nuremberg, Germany and the Americas through JUKI Automation Inc, headquartered in Morrisville, North Carolina, US.

In October 2018, the company announced a cooperative project with Hitachi that uses IoT-based digital innovation to optimize manufacturing processes, improving the production of printed circuit boards by tracking inventory control and improving small lot production.

== See also ==
- SMT Placement Equipment
