= Nathaniel Wheeler Memorial Fountain =

- U.S. National Register of Historic Places
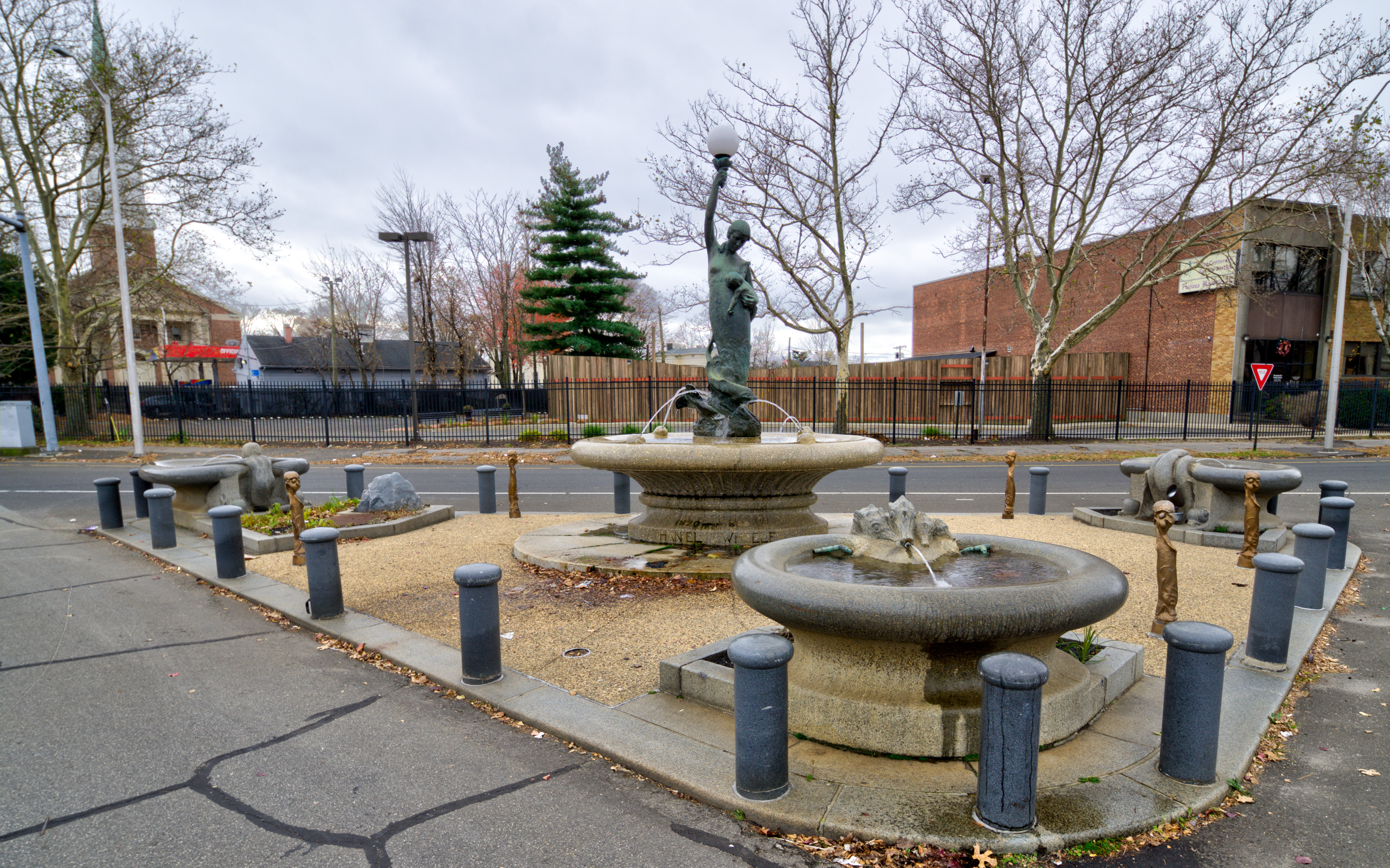
- The fountain in 2023

- Location within Connecticut Location within the United States
- Location: Park and Fairfield Avenues, Bridgeport, Connecticut
- Coordinates: 41.1747°N 73.1987°W
- Built: 1912–1913
- Architect: Gutzon Borglum
- NRHP reference No.: 85000706
- Added to NRHP: April 4, 1985

The Nathaniel Wheeler Memorial Fountain is located in Bridgeport, Connecticut at the intersection of Fairfield and Park Avenues. The fountain was built in 1912–1913 and was added to the National Register of Historic Places on April 4, 1985. The fountain consists of four elements: a central bronze figure of a mermaid rising out of a polished granite pool and three individually ornamented polished granite watering troughs at the angles of the triangular parcel of land raised above the Street. The mermaid holds aloft a lamp in her right hand, and a baby in her left. Its tail is wrapped around two dolphins, and the faces of four babies appear in relief around the rim of the pool. The three surrounding troughs are each adorned with individualized figures.

== History ==
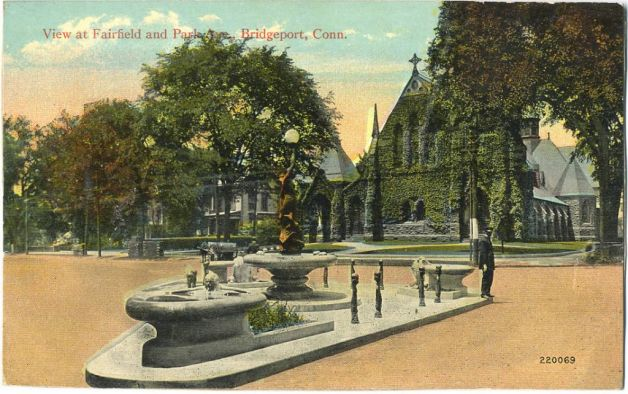
The fountain in a c. 1923 postcard

The fountain was erected in 1912–1913 as the gift of Nathaniel Wheeler's children to the city in memory of their father. Wheeler was a principal in Wheeler & Wilson, an early manufacturer of sewing machines. In addition to moving his factory to Bridgeport in 1856, Wheeler had been active in many city affairs, including plans to beautify the city.

The fountain was a mid-career work of American sculptor Gutzon Borglum. This was the first of a small number of commissions given to him in Bridgeport. The baby held by the mermaid is modeled on his son Lincoln, who was reportedly baptized in the fountain.

== Restoration ==
The fountain underwent a $199,000 restoration in 2009–2010, in which vehicular damage was repaired and the flow of water was restored to the fountain among other refurbishments.

== See also ==
- History of Bridgeport, Connecticut
- National Register of Historic Places listings in Bridgeport, Connecticut
