= Sewing machine =

Machine used to stitch fabric

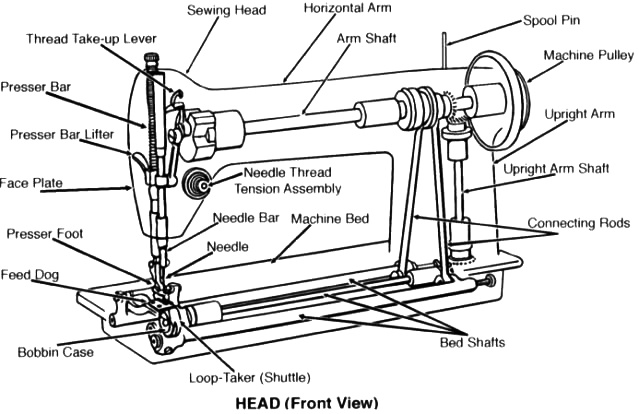
Diagram of a modern sewing machine

Animation of a modern sewing machine as it stitches

A sewing machine is a machine used to sew fabric and materials together with thread. Sewing machines were invented during the first Industrial Revolution to decrease the amount of manual sewing work performed in clothing companies. Since the invention of the first sewing machine, generally considered to have been the work of Englishman Thomas Saint in 1790, the sewing machine has greatly improved the efficiency and productivity of the clothing industry.

Home sewing machines are designed for one person to sew individual items while using a single stitch type at a time. In a modern sewing machine, the process of stitching has been automated, so that the fabric easily glides in and out of the machine. Early sewing machines were powered by either constantly turning a flywheel handle or with a foot-operated treadle mechanism. Electrically-powered machines were later introduced.

Industrial sewing machines, by contrast to domestic machines, are larger, faster, and more varied in their size, cost, and appearance. Many are specialized, thus less versatile.

== History ==
=== Invention ===
Charles Fredrick Wiesenthal, a German-born engineer working in England, was awarded the first British patent for a mechanical device to aid the art of sewing, in 1755. His invention consisted of a double pointed needle with an eye at one end.

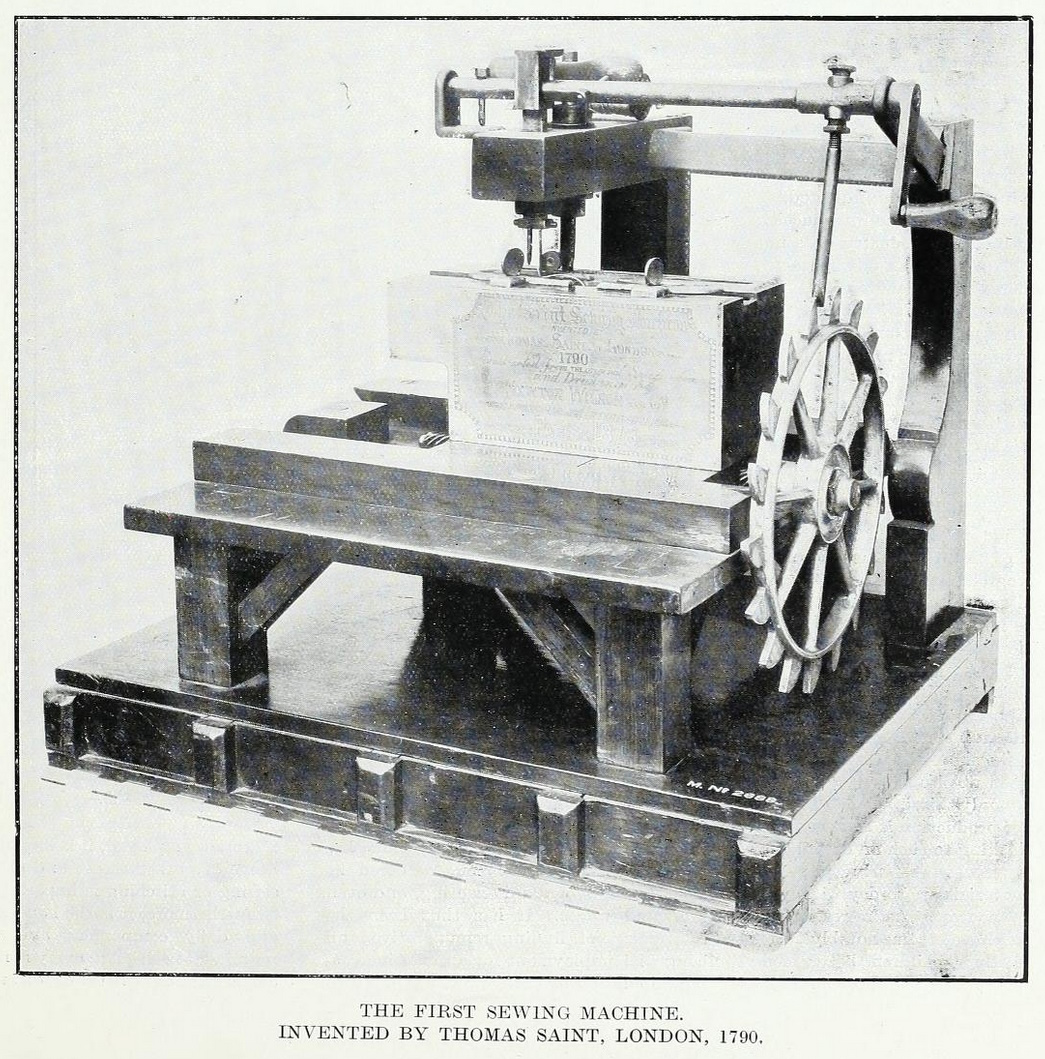
The first sewing machine, invented by Thomas Saint, London, 1790.

In 1790, the English inventor Thomas Saint designed (but did not construct) an early sewing machine. His machine was meant to be used on leather and canvas material, such as the soles of shoes. He was a skilled cabinet maker and his device included many practical and functional features: an overhanging arm; a feed mechanism (adequate for short lengths of leather); a vertical needle bar; and a looper. Saint probably never built a prototype, although William Newton Wilson later used Saint's sketches to build a working model.

His sewing machine used the chain stitch method, in which the machine uses a single thread to make simple stitches in the fabric. A stitching awl would have pierced the material, and a forked-point rod would have carried the thread through the hole, where it would have been hooked underneath and moved to the next stitching place, after which the cycle would be repeated, thereby locking the stitch in place. Saint's machine was designed to aid in the manufacturing of various leather goods, including saddles and bridles, but it was also capable of working with canvas, and was used for sewing ship sails. Although his machine was very advanced for the era, the concept would need steady improvement over the coming decades before it was practical enough to enter into wide use. In 1874, a sewing machine manufacturer, William Newton Wilson, found Saint's drawings in the UK Patent Office, made adjustments to the looper, and built a working machine, currently owned by the Science Museum in London.

In 1804, a sewing machine was built by two Englishmen, Thomas Stone and James Henderson, and a machine for embroidering was constructed by John Duncan in Scotland. An Austrian tailor, Josef Madersperger, began developing his first sewing machine in 1807 and presented his first working machine publicly in 1814. Having received financial support from his government, the Austrian tailor worked on the development of his machine until 1839, when he built a machine imitating the weaving process using the chain stitch.

The first practical and widely used sewing machine was invented by Barthélemy Thimonnier, a French tailor, in 1829. His machine sewed straight seams using a chain stitch like Saint's model had, and in 1830, he signed a contract with Auguste Ferrand, a mining engineer, who made the requisite drawings and submitted a patent application. The patent for his machine was issued on 17 July 1830, and in the same year, he and his partners opened the first machine-based clothing manufacturing company in the world to create army uniforms for the French Army. However, the factory was burned down, reportedly by workers fearful of losing their livelihood, following the issuing of the patent. Thimonnier's original machine was made of wood, but a later version was metal. A model of the earlier machine is exhibited in London at the Science Museum. The machine uses a barbed needle which passes downward through the cloth to grab the thread and pull it up to form a loop to be locked by the next loop.

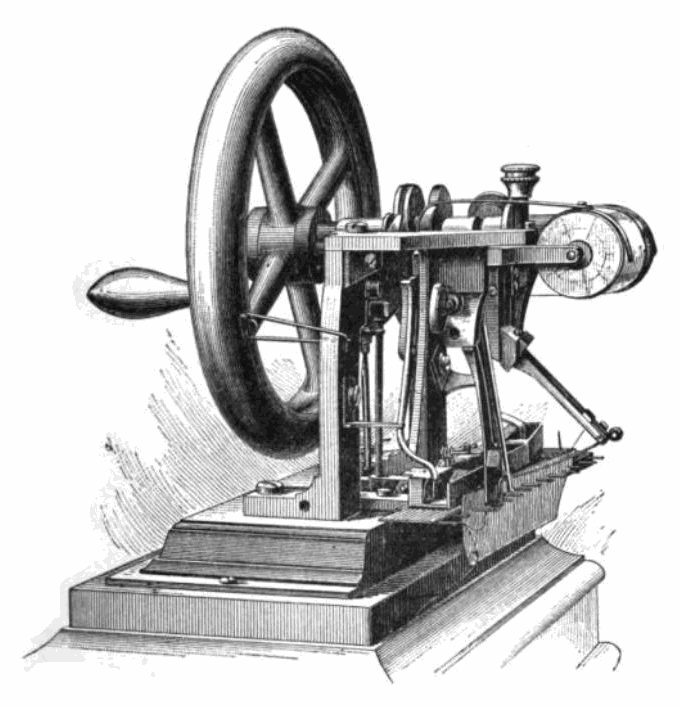
Elias Howe's lockstitch machine, invented in 1845

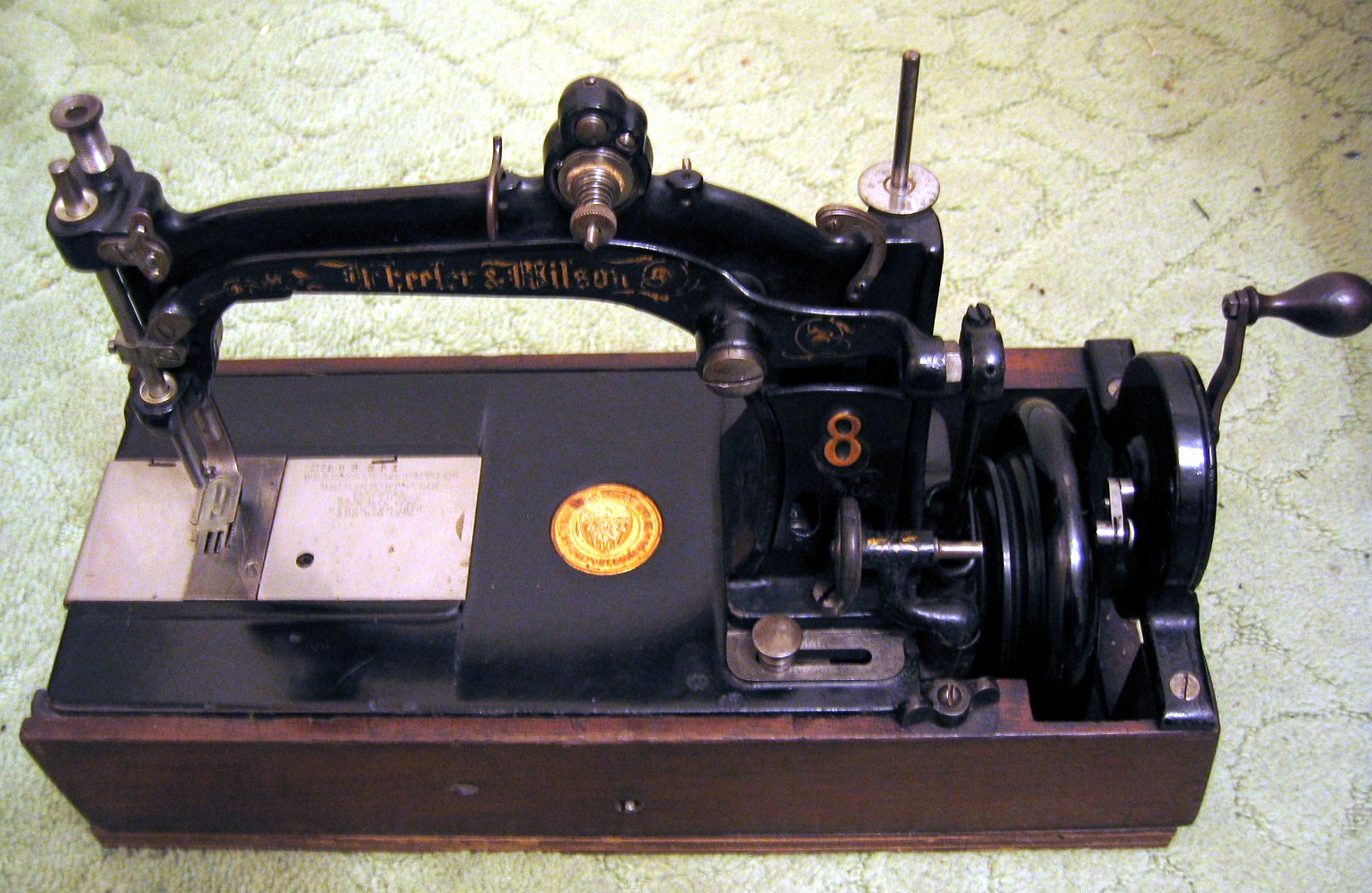
An 1880 hand-cranked machine from the Wheeler and Wilson Company

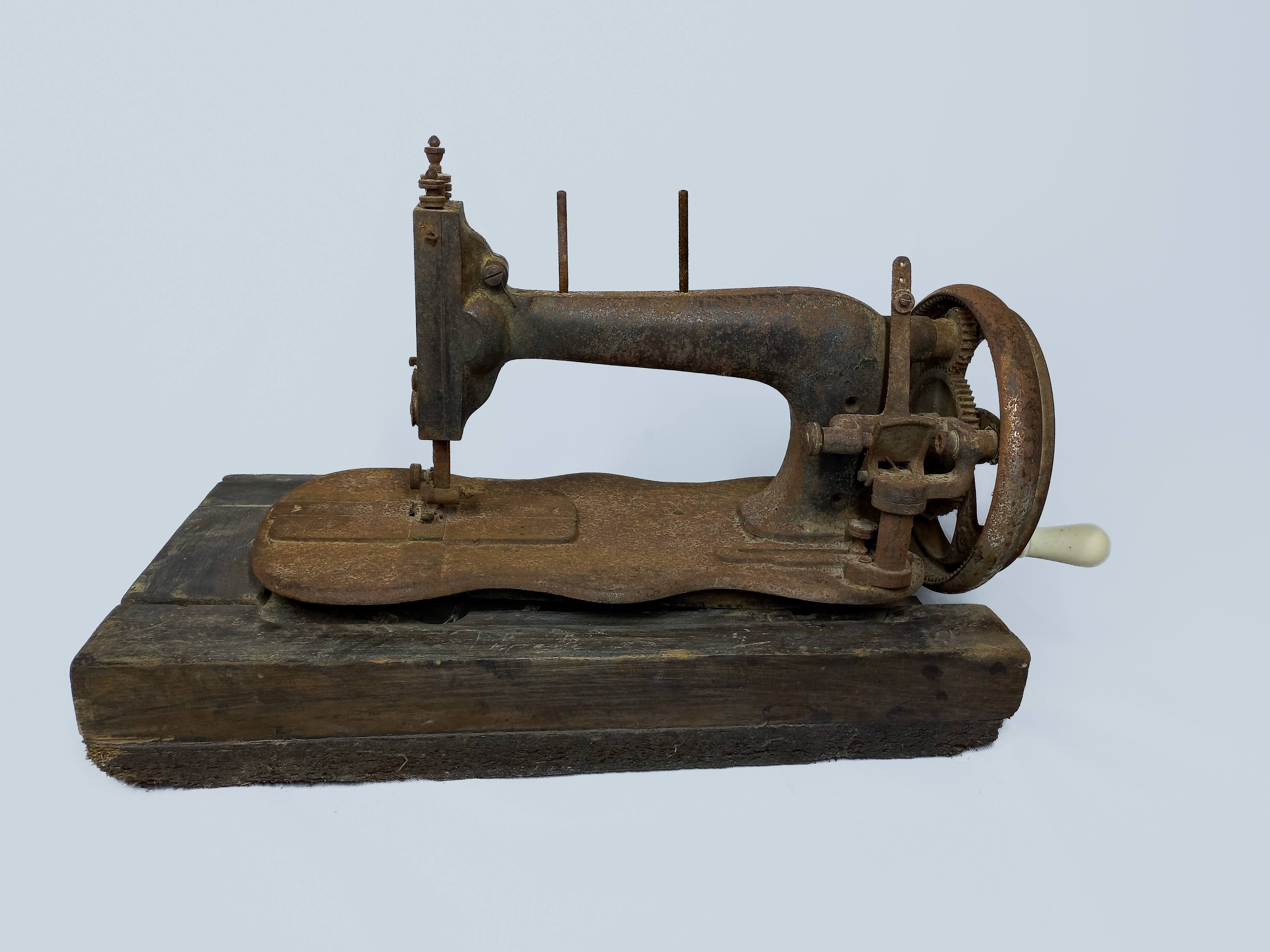
Sewing Machine from the Everyday Collection of the Museu da Capitania de Ilhéus

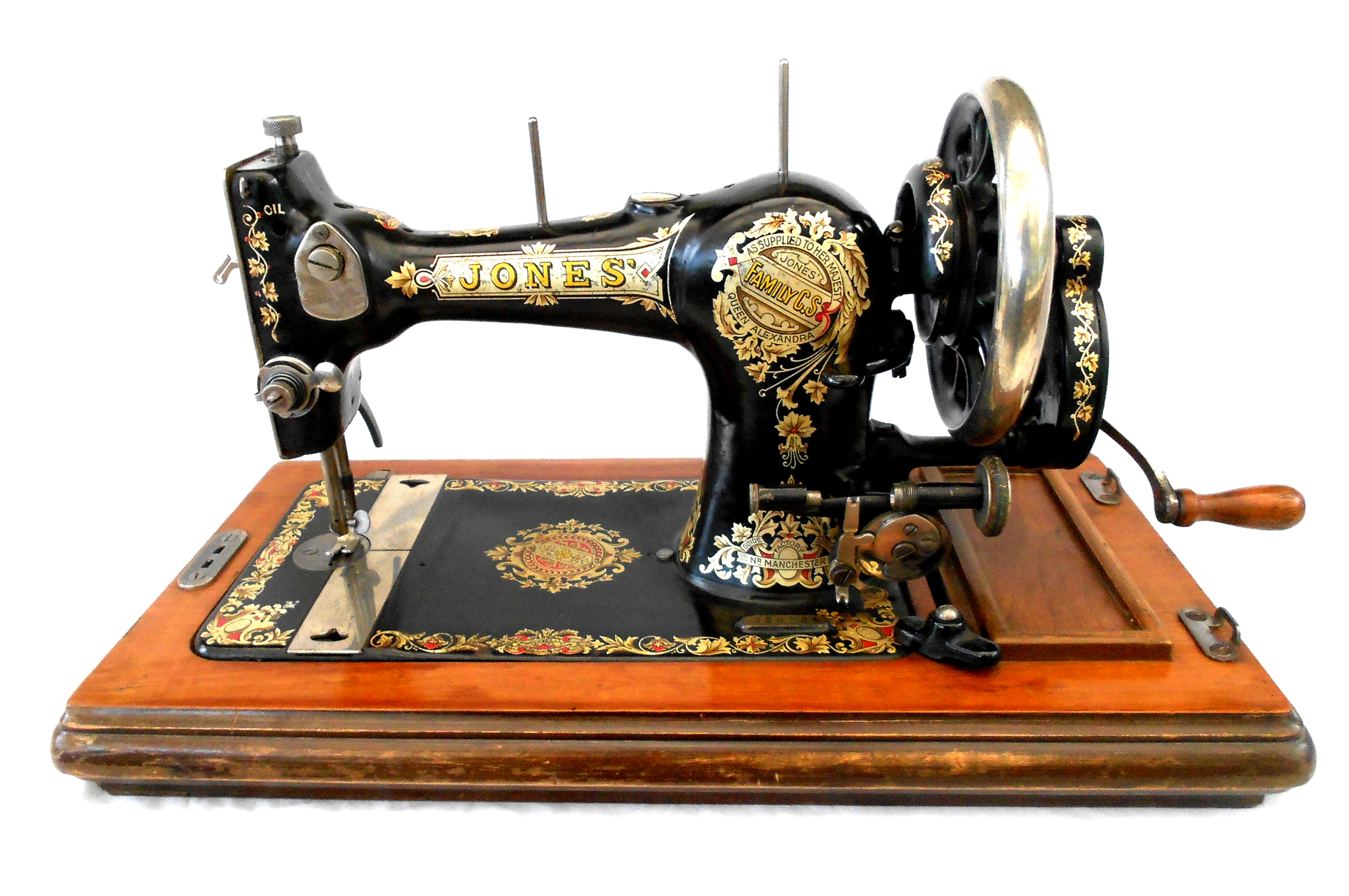
Jones Family CS machine from around 1935

The first American lockstitch sewing machine was invented by Walter Hunt in 1832. His machine used a needle with the eye and the point on the same end carrying the upper thread, and a falling shuttle carrying the lower thread. The curved needle moved through the fabric horizontally, leaving the loop as it withdrew. The shuttle passed through the loop, interlocking the thread. The feed was unreliable, requiring the machine to be stopped frequently and reset up. Hunt eventually lost interest in his machine and sold individual machines without bothering to patent his invention, and only patenting it at a late date of 1854. In 1842, John Greenough patented the first sewing machine in the United States. The British partners Newton and Archibold introduced the eye-pointed needle and the use of two pressing surfaces to keep the pieces of fabric in position, in 1841.

In 1844, English inventors John Fisher and James Gibbons produced a machine which used an eye-pointed needle carrying one thread and a shuttle carrying the other to make a double-loop chain stitch. This was a little earlier than the very similar machines built by Isaac Merritt Singer in 1851 and Elias Howe, in 1845. Fisher's machine was intended to embroider fabric or make ornamented lace, and was not created to be a general sewing machine. Despite this, it was able to be adapted into one, and, along with John Duncan's machine, formed part of a court case challenging Elias Howe's 1845 patent.

=== Industrial competition ===
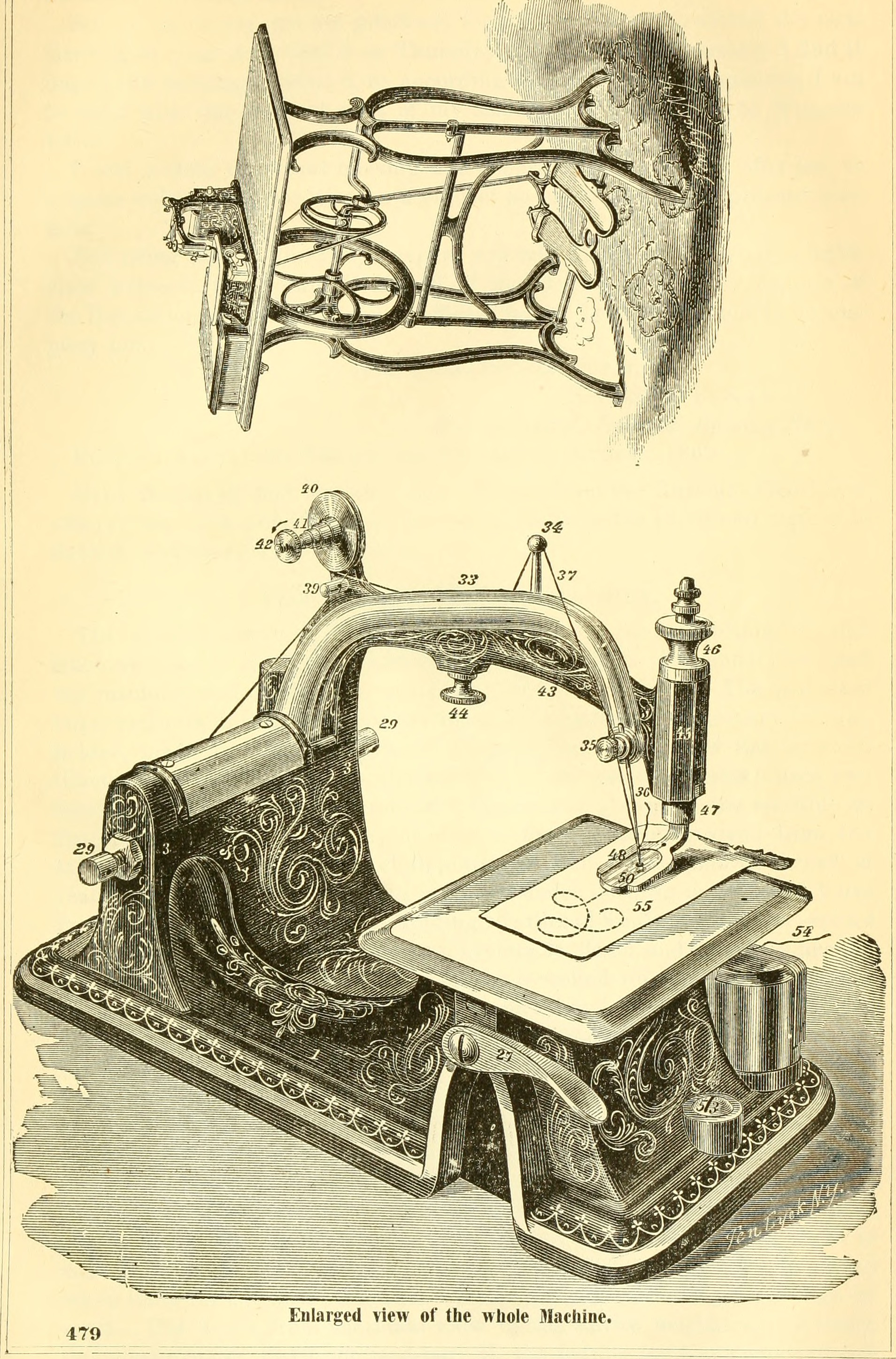
Elliptic sewing machine with elliptic hook and stationary bobbin, American Institute Fair, 1862

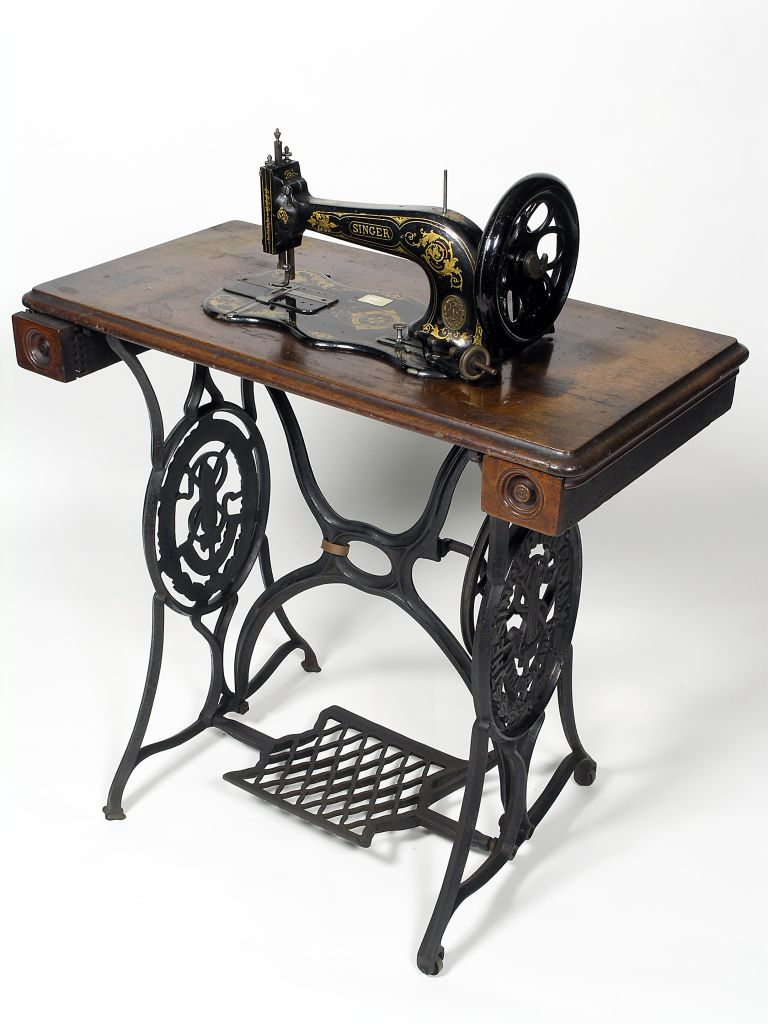
Singer treadle machine

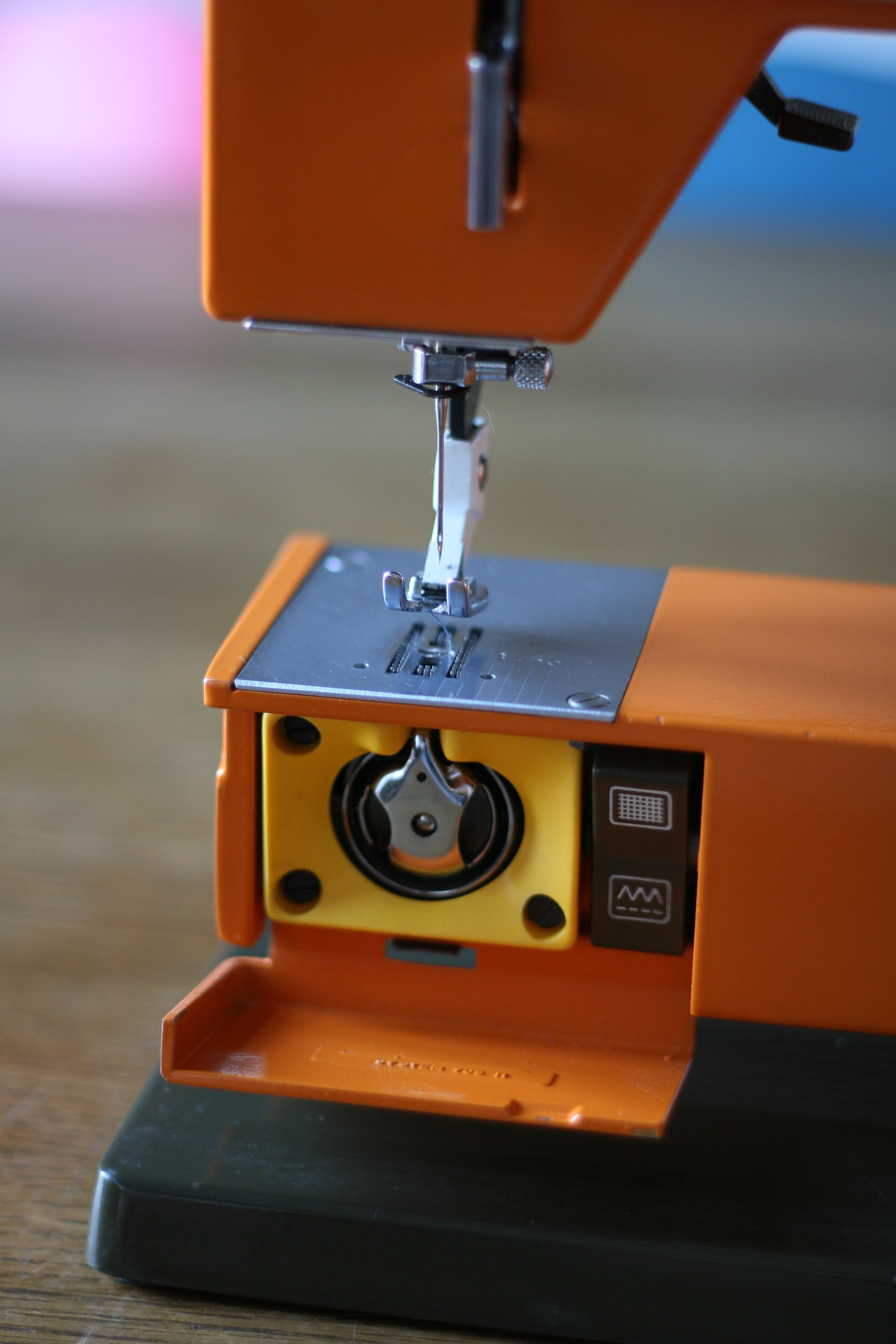
The bobbin driver of a Husqvarna 3600 sewing machine

Elias Howe, born in Spencer, Massachusetts, created his sewing machine in 1845, using a similar method to Fisher's except that the fabric was held vertically. An important improvement on his machine was to have the needle running away from the point, starting from the eye. After a lengthy stay in England trying to attract interest in his machine, he returned to America to find various people infringing his patent, among them Isaac Merritt Singer. He eventually won a case for patent infringement in 1854 and was awarded the right to claim royalties from the manufacturers using ideas covered by his patent, including Singer.

Singer had seen a rotary sewing machine being repaired in a Boston shop. As an engineer, he thought it was clumsy and decided to design a better one. The machine he devised used a falling shuttle instead of a rotary one; the needle was mounted vertically and included a presser foot to hold the cloth in place. It had a fixed arm to hold the needle and included a basic tension system. This machine combined elements of Thimonnier, Hunt and Howe's machines. Singer was granted an American patent in 1851. The foot treadle used since the Middle Ages, used to convert reciprocating to rotary motion, was adapted to drive the sewing machine, leaving both hands free.

When Howe learned of Singer's machine he took him to court, where Howe won and Singer was forced to pay a lump sum for all machines already produced. Singer then took out a license under Howe's patent and paid him US$1.15 per machine before entering into a joint partnership with a lawyer named Edward Clark. They created the first hire-purchase arrangement to allow people to purchase their machines through payments over time.

Meanwhile, Allen B. Wilson developed a shuttle that reciprocated in a short arc, which was an improvement over Singer and Howe's. However, John Bradshaw had patented a similar device and threatened to sue, so Wilson decided to try a new method. He went into partnership with Nathaniel Wheeler to produce a machine with a rotary hook instead of a shuttle. This was far quieter and smoother than other methods, with the result that the Wheeler & Wilson Company produced more machines in the 1850s and 1860s than any other manufacturer. Wilson also invented the four-motion feed mechanism that is still used on every sewing machine today. This had a forward, down, back and up motion, which drew the cloth through in an even and smooth motion. Charles Miller patented the first machine to stitch buttonholes. Throughout the 1850s more and more companies were being formed, each trying to sue the others for patent infringement. This triggered a patent thicket known as the Sewing Machine War.

In 1856, the Sewing Machine Combination was formed, consisting of Singer, Howe, Wheeler, Wilson, and Grover and Baker. These four companies pooled their patents, with the result that all other manufacturers had to obtain a license for $15 per machine. This lasted until 1877 when the last patent expired.

James Edward Allen Gibbs (1829–1902), a farmer from Raphine in Rockbridge County, Virginia, patented the first chain stitch single-thread sewing machine on June 2, 1857. In partnership with James Willcox, Gibbs became a principal partner in Willcox & Gibbs Sewing Machine Company. Willcox & Gibbs commercial sewing machines are still used in the 21st century, with spare parts available.

=== Market expansion ===
Thomas Saint's chain stitch used on the first ever complete sewing machine design for leather work. An awl preceded the eye pointed needle to make a hole in preparation for the thread

William Jones started making sewing machines in 1859 and in 1860 formed a partnership with Thomas Chadwick. As Chadwick & Jones, they manufactured sewing machines at Ashton-under-Lyne, England until 1863. Their machines used designs from Howe and Wilson produced under licence. Thomas Chadwick later joined Bradbury & Co. William Jones opened a factory in Guide Bridge, Manchester in 1869. In 1893 a Jones advertising sheet claimed that this factory was the "Largest Factory in England Exclusively Making First Class Sewing Machines". The firm was renamed as the Jones Sewing Machine Co. Ltd and was later acquired by Brother Industries of Japan, in 1968.

Clothing manufacturers were the first sewing machine customers, and used them to produce the first ready-to-wear clothing and shoes. In the 1860s consumers began purchasing them, and the machines—ranging in price from £6 to £15 in Britain depending on features—became very common in middle-class homes. Owners were much more likely to spend free time with their machines to make and mend clothing for their families than to visit friends, and women's magazines and household guides such as Mrs Beeton's offered dress patterns and instructions. A sewing machine could produce a man's shirt in about one hour, compared to 14 1/2 hours by hand.

In 1877, the world's first crochet machine was invented and patented by Joseph M. Merrow, then-president of what had started in the 1840s, as a machine shop to develop specialized machinery for the knitting operations. This crochet machine was the first production overlock sewing machine. The Merrow Machine Company went on to become one of the largest American manufacturers of overlock sewing machines and remains in the 21st century as the last American over-lock sewing machine manufacturer.

In 1885 Singer patented the Singer Vibrating Shuttle sewing machine, which used Allen B. Wilson's idea for a vibrating shuttle and was a better lockstitcher than the oscillating shuttles of the time. Millions of the machines, perhaps the world's first really practical sewing machine for domestic use, were produced until finally superseded by rotary shuttle machines in the 20th century. Sewing machines continued being made to roughly the same design—with more lavish decoration—until well into the 1900s.

The first electric machines were developed by Singer Sewing Co. and introduced in 1889. By the end of the First World War, Singer was offering hand, treadle and electric machines for sale. At first, the electric machines were standard machines with a motor strapped on the side, but as more homes gained power, they became more popular, and the motor was gradually introduced into the casing.

=== Introduction of electronic machines ===
Sewing machines were strictly mechanical, using gears, shafts, levers, and so on, until the 1970s when electronic machines were introduced to the market. Electronic sewing machines incorporate components such as circuit boards, computer chips, and additional motors for independent control of machine functions. These electronic components enabled new features such as automating thread cutters, needle positioning, and back-tacking, as well as digitized stitch patterns and stitch combinations. Because of the lifespan and increased complexity of the electronic parts, electronic sewing machines do not last as long as mechanical sewing machines, which can last over 100 years.

== Stitches ==
The basic chain stitch

Formation of a lock-stitch using a boat shuttle as employed in early domestic machines

Lockstitch utilising a rotating hook invented by Allen B Wilson. This is employed on many modern machines

Formation of the double locking chain stitch

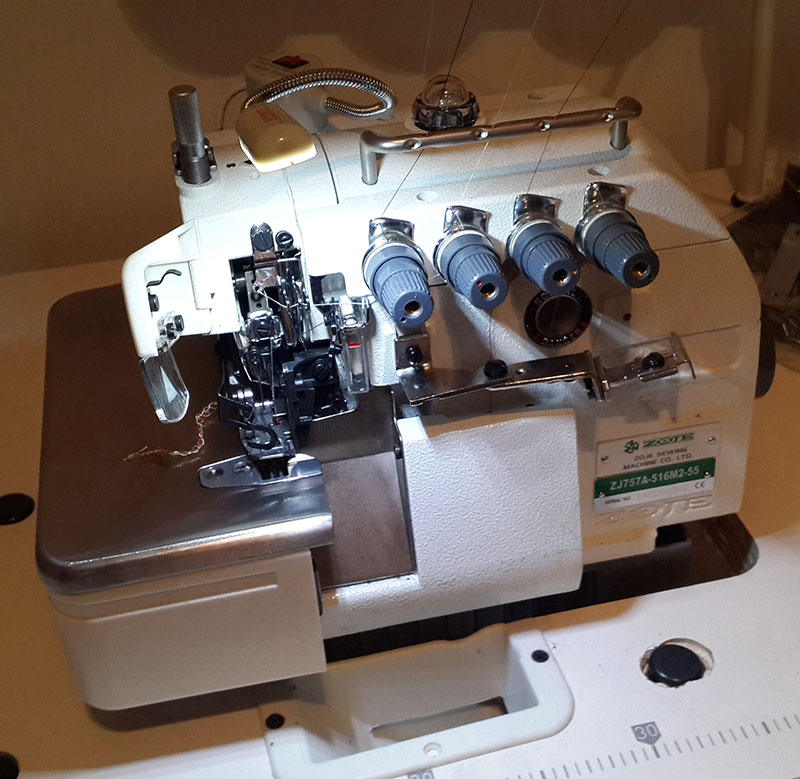
A Zoje industrial overlocker

Sewing machines can make a great variety of plain or patterned stitches. Ignoring strictly decorative aspects, over three dozen distinct stitch formations are formally recognized by the ISO 4915:1991 standard, involving one to seven separate threads to form the stitch.

Plain stitches fall into four general categories: chainstitch, lockstitch, overlock, and coverstitch.

Chain stitch was used by early sewing machines and has two major drawbacks:

- The stitch is not self-locking, and if the thread breaks at any point or is not tied at both ends, the whole length of stitching comes out. It is also easily ripped out.
- The direction of sewing cannot be changed much from one stitch to the next, or the stitching process fails.

A better stitch was found in the lockstitch. The chain stitch is still used today in clothing manufacture, though due to its major drawbacks, it is generally paired with an overlock stitch along the same seam.

Lockstitch is the familiar stitch performed by most household sewing machines and most industrial "single needle" sewing machines, using two threads, one passed through a needle and one coming from a bobbin or shuttle. Each thread stays on its own side of the material while being sewn, interlacing with the other thread at each needle hole by means of a bobbin driver. As a result, a lockstitch can be formed anywhere on the material being sewn; it does not need to be near an edge.

Overlock, also known as "serging" or "serger stitch", can be formed with two to four threads, one or two needles, and one or two loopers. Overlock sewing machines are usually equipped with knives that trim or create the edge immediately in front of the stitch formation. Household and industrial overlock machines are commonly used for garment seams in knit or stretchy fabrics, for garment seams where the fabric is light enough that the seam does not need to be pressed open, and for protecting edges against raveling. Machines using two to four threads are most common, and frequently one machine can be configured for several varieties of overlock stitch. Overlock machines with five or more threads usually make both a chainstitch with one needle and one looper, and an overlock stitch with the remaining needles and loopers. This combination is known as a "safety stitch". A similar machine used for stretch fabrics is called a mock safety.

Coverstitch is formed by two or more needles and one or two loopers. Like lockstitch and chainstitch, coverstitch can be formed anywhere on the material being sewn. One looper manipulates a thread below the material being sewn, forming a bottom cover stitch against the needle threads. An additional looper above the material can form a top cover stitch simultaneously. The needle threads form parallel rows, while the looper threads cross back and forth all the needle rows. Coverstitch is so-called because the grid of crossing needle and looper threads covers raw seam edges, much as the overlock stitch does. It is widely used in garment construction, particularly for attaching trims and flat seaming where the raw edges can be finished in the same operation as forming the seam.

A zigzag stitch is a variant geometry of the lockstitch. It is a back-and-forth stitch used where a straight stitch will not suffice, such as in preventing raveling of a fabric, in stitching stretchable fabrics, and in temporarily joining two work pieces edge-to-edge. When creating a zigzag stitch, the back-and-forth motion of the sewing machine's needle is controlled by a cam. As the cam rotates, a fingerlike follower that is connected to the needle bar rides along the cam and tracks its indentations. As the follower moves in and out, the needle bar is moved from side to side. Very old sewing machines lack this hardware and so cannot natively produce a zigzag stitch, but there are often shank-driven attachments available which enable them to do so.

== Feed mechanisms ==
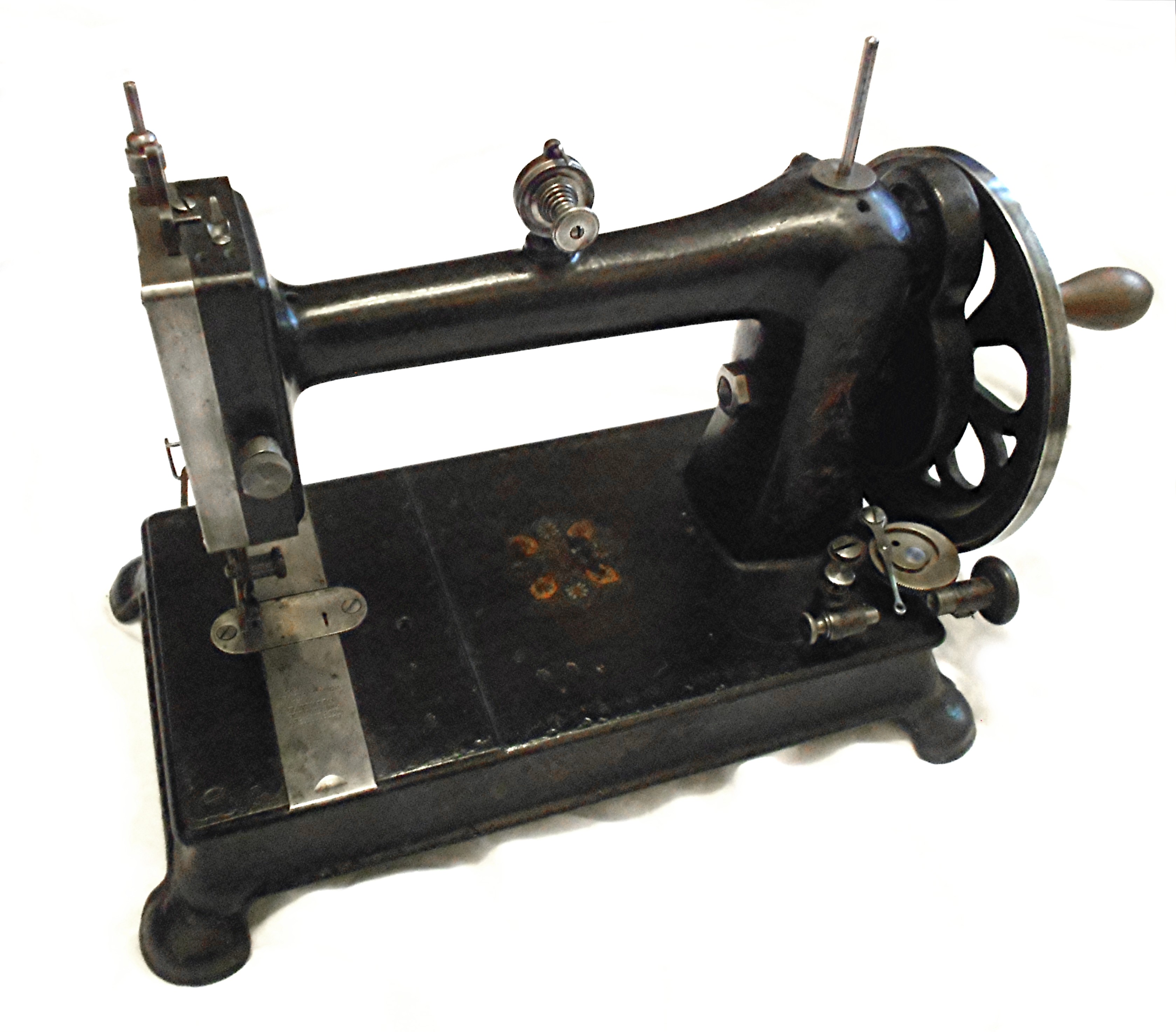
Vintage Davis vertical feed (walking foot) sewing machine produced around 1890

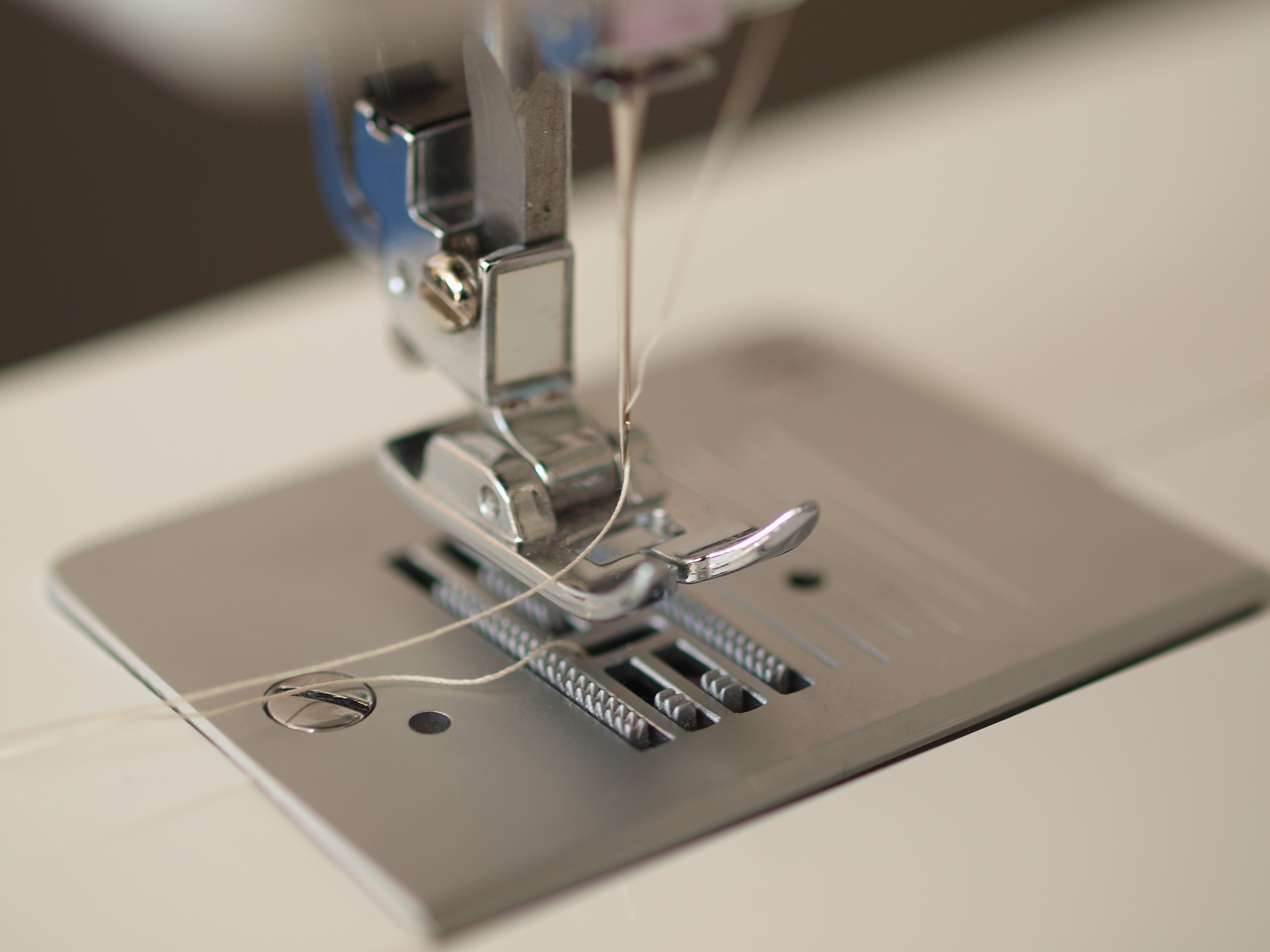
Presser foot raised with feed dogs visible

Besides the basic motion of needles, loopers and bobbins, the material being sewn must move so that each cycle of needle motion involves a different part of the material. This motion is known as feed, and sewing machines have almost as many ways of feeding material as they do of forming stitches. For general categories, there are: drop feed, needle feed, walking foot, puller, and manual. Often, multiple types of feed are used on the same machine. Besides these general categories, there are also uncommon feed mechanisms used in specific applications like edge joining fur, making seams on caps, and blind stitching.

The drop feed mechanism is used by almost all household machines and involves a mechanism below the sewing surface of the machine. When the needle is withdrawn from the material being sewn, a set of "feed dogs" is pushed up through slots in the machine surface, then dragged horizontally past the needle. The dogs are serrated to grip the material, and a "presser foot" is used to keep the material in contact with the dogs. At the end of their horizontal motion, the dogs are lowered again and returned to their original position while the needle makes its next pass through the material. While the needle is in the material, there is no feed action. Almost all household machines and the majority of industrial machines use drop feed.

Differential feed is a variation of drop feed with two independent sets of dogs, one before and one after the needle. By changing their relative motions, these sets of dogs can be used to stretch or compress the material in the vicinity of the needle. This is extremely useful when sewing stretchy material, and overlock machines (heavily used for such materials) frequently have differential feed.

A needle feed, used only in industrial machines, moves the material while the needle is in the material. In fact, the needle may be the primary feeding force. Some implementations of needle feed rock the axis of needle motion back and forth, while other implementations keep the axis vertical while moving it forward and back. In both cases, there is no feed action while the needle is out of the material. Needle feed is often used in conjunction with a modified drop feed, and is very common on industrial two needle machines. Most household machines do not use needle feed.

A walking foot replaces the stationary presser foot with one that moves along with whatever other feed mechanisms the machine already has. As the walking foot moves, it shifts the workpiece along with it. It is most useful for sewing heavy materials where needle feed is mechanically inadequate, for spongy or cushioned materials where lifting the foot out of contact with the material helps in the feeding action, and for sewing many layers together where a drop feed will cause the lower layers to shift out of position with the upper layers.

Some factory machines and a few household machines are set up with an auxiliary puller feed, which grips the material being sewn (usually from behind the needles) and pulls it with a force and reliability usually not possible with other types of feed. Puller feeds are seldom built directly into the basic sewing machine. Their action must be synchronized with the needle and feed action built into the machine to avoid damaging the machine. Pullers are also limited to straight seams, or very nearly so. Despite their additional cost and limitations, pulling feeds are very useful when making large heavy items like tents and vehicle covers.

A manual feed is used primarily in freehand embroidery, quilting, and shoe repair. With manual feed, the stitch length and direction is controlled entirely by the motion of the material being sewn. Frequently some form of hoop or stabilizing material is used with fabric to keep the material under proper tension and aid in moving it around. Most household machines can be set for manual feed by disengaging the drop feed dogs. Most industrial machines can not be used for manual feed without actually removing the feed dogs.

== Needles ==
Sewing machines use special needles tailored to their needs and to the character of the material being sewn.

Modern sewing machines may be equipped with a needle guard. Needle guards are a safety measure that are used to help avoid injuries.

== Tension ==
Tension in a sewing machine refers to the pull of the thread between the needle and the bobbin. Sewing machines have tension discs and a tension regulator. If the stitch is too saggy or too tight, the most likely cause is a tension problem.

== Industrial versus domestic ==
Industrial sewing machine (left), domestic sewing machine (right)

There are mainly two types of sewing machines available: industrial and domestic. Industrial sewing machines are larger, faster, and more varied in their size, cost, appearance, and versatility. An industrial sewing machine can handle heavy-duty sewing jobs. Industrial machines, unlike domestic machines, perform a single dedicated task and are capable of continuous use for long periods; they have larger moving parts and larger motors rated for continuous operation. Parts for different industrial machines, such as motors, sewing feet, and bobbins may be interchangeable, but this is not always so.

The motors on industrial machines, as with most of their components, lights, etc., are separate, usually mounted to the underside of the table. Domestic machines have their OEM motors mounted inside the machine. There are two different types of motor available for industrial machines: a servo motor (which uses less electricity and is silent when not in use), and the more traditional clutch motor (which is always spinning, even when not in use).

A clutch motor is always running and making noises when it is connected to electricity. The constant operation ensures consistency and speed.

== Social impact ==
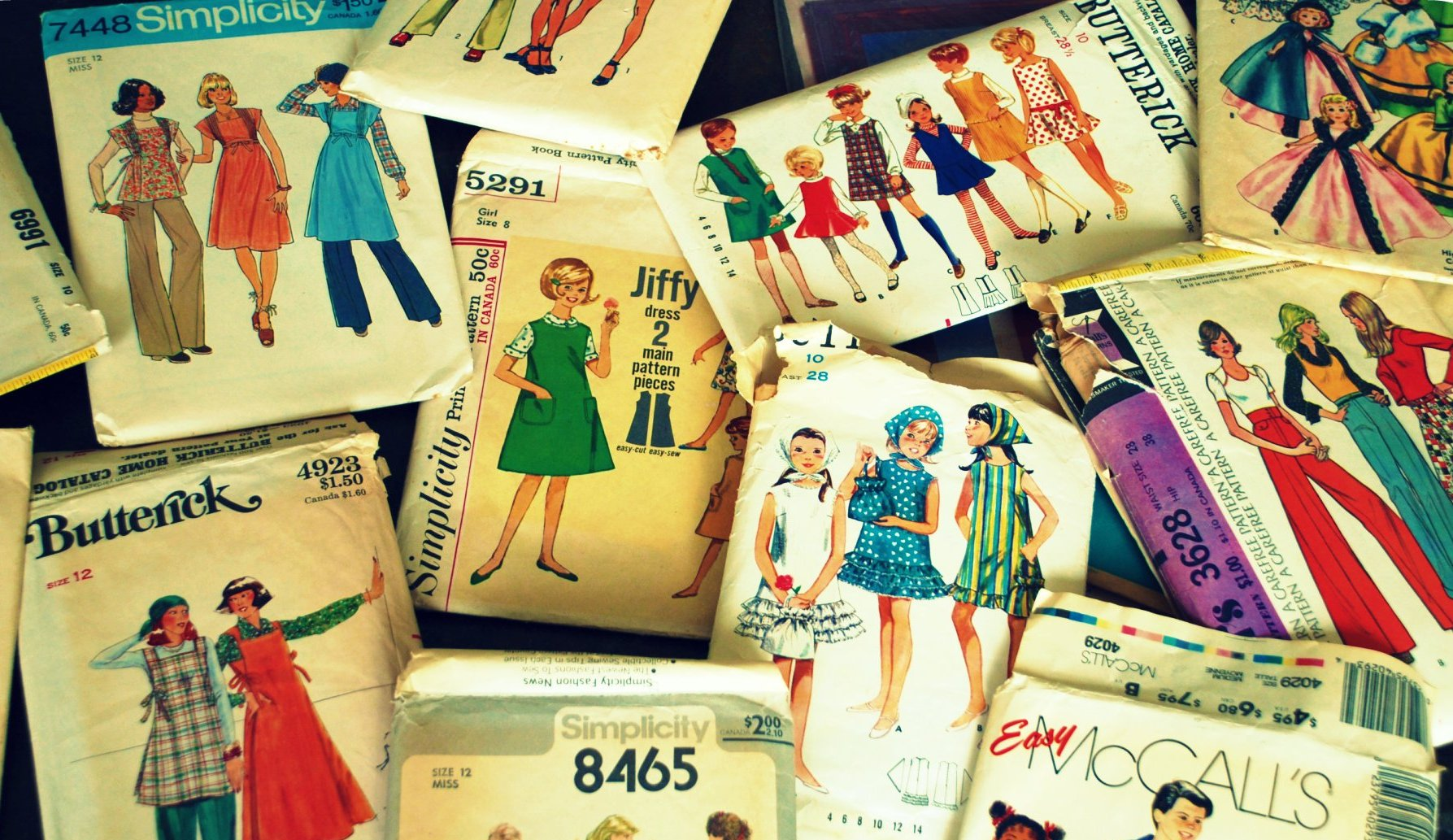
Vintage sewing patterns

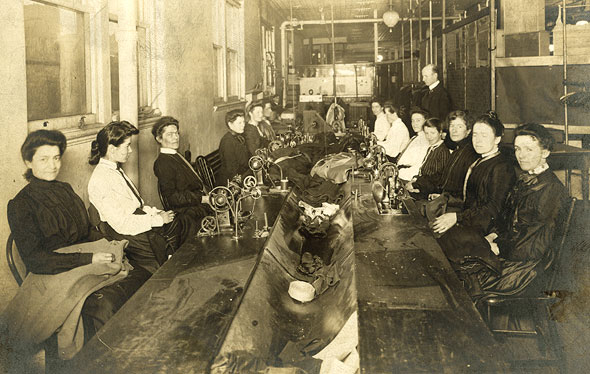
Seamstresses in 1904

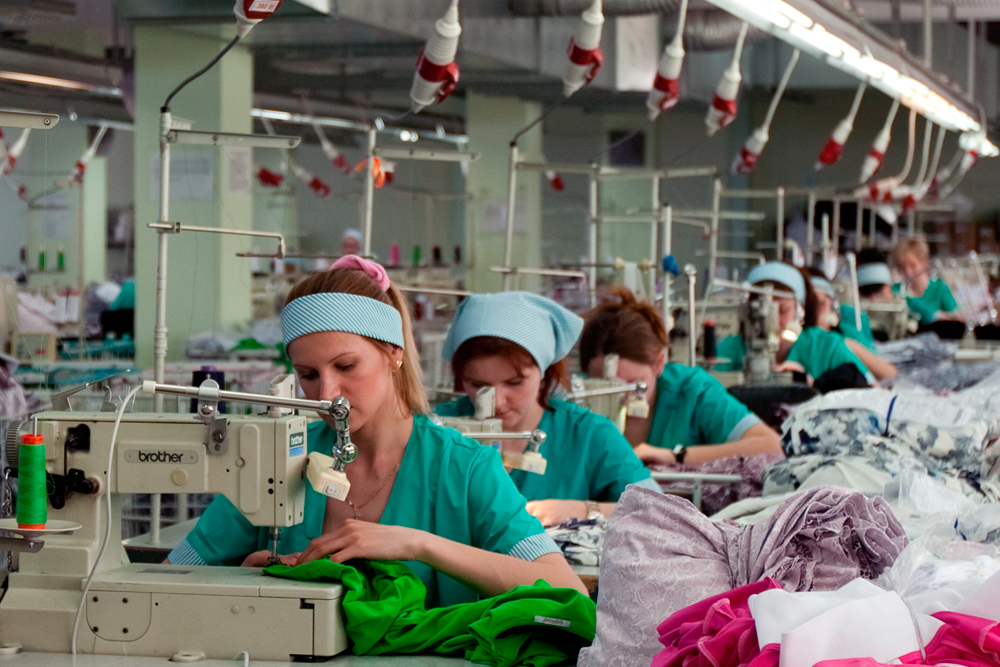
Workers using Brother sewing machines at a clothing factory

Before sewing machines were invented, women spent much of their time maintaining their family's clothing. Middle-class housewives, even with the aid of a hired seamstress, would devote several days of each month to this task. It took an experienced seamstress at least 14 hours to make a dress shirt for a man; a woman's dress took 10 hours; and a pair of summer trousers took nearly three hours. Most people except the very well-off would have only two sets of clothing: a work outfit and a Sunday outfit.

Sewing machines reduced the time for making a dress shirt to an hour and 15 minutes; the time to make a dress to an hour; and the time for a pair of summer pants to 38 minutes. This reduced labor resulted in women having a diminished role in household management, and allowed more hours for their own leisure as well as the ability to seek more employment.

Industrial use of sewing machines further reduced the burden placed upon housewives, moving clothing production from housewives and seamstresses to large-scale factories. The movement to large-scale factories resulted in a great increase in productivity; fewer workers could produce the same amount of clothing, reducing clothing prices significantly. As supply increased, prices also dropped.

While many middle-class women enjoyed increased leisure during the Victorian era, working-class women faced intensifying demands, particularly in the clothing industry. The invention of the sewing machine, which revolutionized garment production, brought longer working hours for seamstresses, especially during peak times of the year when wealthy customers placed orders in preparation for "the Season"—the high point of the fashion season. Many women worked a minimum of eighteen hours, and sometimes up to twenty hours a day, particularly those employed by high-end London retailers. Despite the technological advancements, the industry's seasonality left women with low wages during peak periods and no income for much of the year. Faced with such economic instability, some women turned to prostitution to survive.

This moral and economic tension extended to broader societal concerns. A challenge working-class women in the textile industry often faced was the notion that factory work could lead to moral decline, fueling fears of widespread prostitution. This anxiety was reflected in literature of the time, with several novels depicting female characters who fell into prostitution after entering factory work. Often, these narratives attributed their downfall to spending wages on 'finery' or clothing, which was seen as fostering vanity and eventual vice. Elizabeth Gaskell's Mary Barton (1848), set in Manchester, exemplifies these themes. From the 1840s to the 1920s, such questions about the relationship between the clothing women wore and the clothing they made generated moral panics. Works like Benjamin Disraeli's Sybil (1845), Theodore Dreiser's Sister Carrie (1900), Emile Zola's Au Bonheur des Dames (1883), and Honoré de Balzac's Splendeurs et misères des courtisanes (1847) similarly explored these themes.

Adding to these discussions was the influence of William Acton, a Parisian-trained British doctor who argued that one of the primary causes of prostitution was women's excessive love of finery, or clothing. Acton suggested that this "vanity" drove women into prostitution, although historians debate whether he meant that women engaged in prostitution to buy fashionable clothing or that admiration for the attire worn by prostitutes led them into the practice. Public debates surrounding the Contagious Disease Acts of 1864 and 1866 highlighted opposing views. For instance, Lucy Bull, a matron from the Royal Albert Hospital, rejected Acton's moralistic interpretation and instead attributed prostitution to the poverty many women faced.

Such interpretations reflect broader societal anxieties about women's labor and morality during this period. Helen Rogers (1997) observes that by midcentury, the needlewoman had become an iconic figure in the Victorian imagination. She symbolized isolation, sexuality, single women's work, wealthy women's vanity, and even prostitution, blending labor and morality in complex ways. This perception of seamstresses often mirrored broader concerns about women working outside the home and the implications for societal norms.

Pam Inder (2015) highlights that such concerns fueled a push for men to receive higher wages, enabling women to remain at home and reinforcing the Victorian belief that women should not work for pay outside the domestic sphere. However, seamstresses, a dominant segment of working women, remained at the center of these tensions. Their work was frequently viewed negatively, symbolizing a broader fear of women's growing participation in the workforce and its perceived moral risks.

Despite these societal ideals, the economic reality of women's work remained stark. Louise Tilly and Joan Scott (1987) note that nearly half of women workers in England held manufacturing jobs in 1851. Crucially, 40 percent of these women worked from home, performing non-mechanized outwork or slop-work, which was cheap, ready-made clothing. Home-based production offered significant advantages to the garment industry, allowing it to rely on cheap, flexible labor. The long-standing association of needlework with women's work reinforced this gendered division of labor, enabling industry leaders to exploit a vast network of low-cost laborers. Even as garment factories emerged in the 1850s, the industry continued to combine factory production with sweatshops and home-based labor, maintaining an exploitative and gendered system.

At the same time, economic pressures frequently forced working-class families to defy legal efforts to keep children in school. Mid-19th-century laws sought to regulate child labor and prioritize education, but these initiatives often conflicted with the realities faced by rural families. Many parents sent their daughters to work for wages, often far from home, as a necessary means of survival. For working-class women, labor in the textile industry thus became both a necessity and a source of moral scrutiny, reflecting the tensions between societal ideals and economic imperatives.

Many of the women who had previously been busy at home could now seek employment in factories, increasing the income for their family. This allowed families to be able to afford more sets of clothing and items than they previously could. For seamstresses, home sewing machines allowed them to produce clothing for the average person during periods when demand for fitted clothes was low, effectively increasing their earnings. When industrial sewing machines first became popular, many seamstresses, either working in factories or from home, lost their jobs as fewer workers could now produce the same output. In the long run these now unemployed skilled workers along with thousands of men and children would eventually be able to gain employment in jobs created as the clothing industry grew.

The sewing machine's effects on the clothing industry resulted in major changes for other industries as well. Cotton production needed to increase in order to match the demand of the new clothing factories. As a result, cotton became planted in new areas where it had not previously been farmed. Other industries involved in the process benefited as well such as metal companies who provided parts for the machines, and shippers to move the increased amounts of goods. In addition to being important for clothing production, sewing machines also became important in the manufacturing of furniture with upholstery, curtains and towels, toys, books, and many other products.

== See also ==
- Sewing
- Embroidery machine
- List of sewing machine brands
