= Sewing Machine Combination =

The Sewing Machine Combination or the Sewing Machine Trust was the first patent pool in US history. It was formed by the "Albany Agreement" of 24 October 1856 and lasted until its last patent expired in 1877. It existed for the purpose of reducing the licensing and litigation overhead being imposed by the patent thicket known as the Sewing Machine War.

Prior to the Sewing Machine Combination, companies could purchase rights from Elias Howe for a royalty fee of $25 for every machine sold. In 1856, president of the Grover & Baker company, Orlando B. Potter, worked with Howe, Wheeler & Wilson, and Isaac Singer's I. M. Singer and Company to pool their patents and agree to terms of use. The requirements were: at least 24 manufacturers were to be licensed; the founding companies would equally share the profits; and Howe would receive a $5 royalty for each machine sold in the U.S. and $1 for exported machines. Interests only were pooled, prices were not set, and the market was open to fair competition, which allowed companies to concentrate on manufacturing and marketing the machines, rather than litigation.

Of the nine patents pooled, three were particularly crucial: the lockstitch, the four-motion feed, and the combination of a vertical needle with horizontal sewing surface. In addition to its four member companies, dozens of other companies licensed its patents, for which they paid royalties and submitted annual production reports.

Twenty years after the Combination expired, only two of the companies remained in business.
