= Walking foot =

Sewing machine mechanism

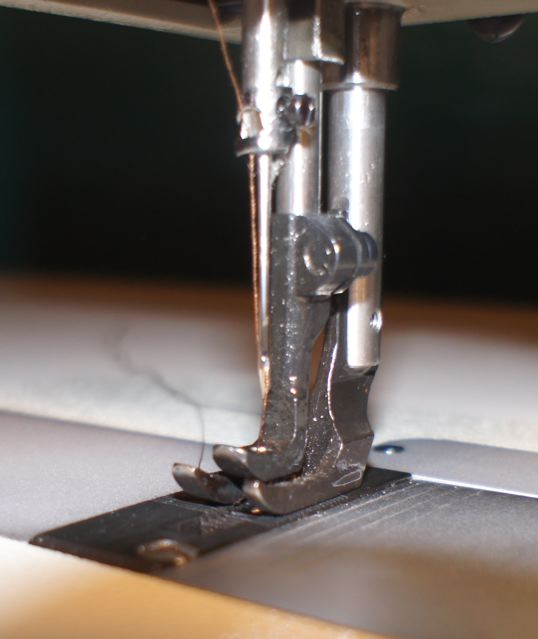
Walking foot

A walking foot is a mechanism for feeding the workpiece through a sewing machine as it is being stitched. It is most useful for sewing heavy materials where needle feed is mechanically inadequate, for spongy or cushioned materials where lifting the foot out of contact with the material helps in the feeding action, and for sewing many layers together where a drop feed will cause the lower layers to shift out of position with the upper layers. A walking foot is also good for sewing materials with varying layers because it can climb up and down these layers easier than other feeding mechanisms.

A sewing machine might have a single walking foot with a second holding foot, or two walking feet which both feed with alternating action. A walking foot is usually combined with another feed mechanism, such as a drop feed or a needle feed.

It is not a commonly used sewing machine attachment for household use, although it is used for both quilting and bag making, but this type of feed is common in industrial heavy-duty machines. Some household machines are marketed as having a walking foot, but actually have a puller feed. However, almost all household sewing machines use a standard connector for their presser foot, and so add-on walking foot attachments are available.

== "Plaid Matcher" attachments ==
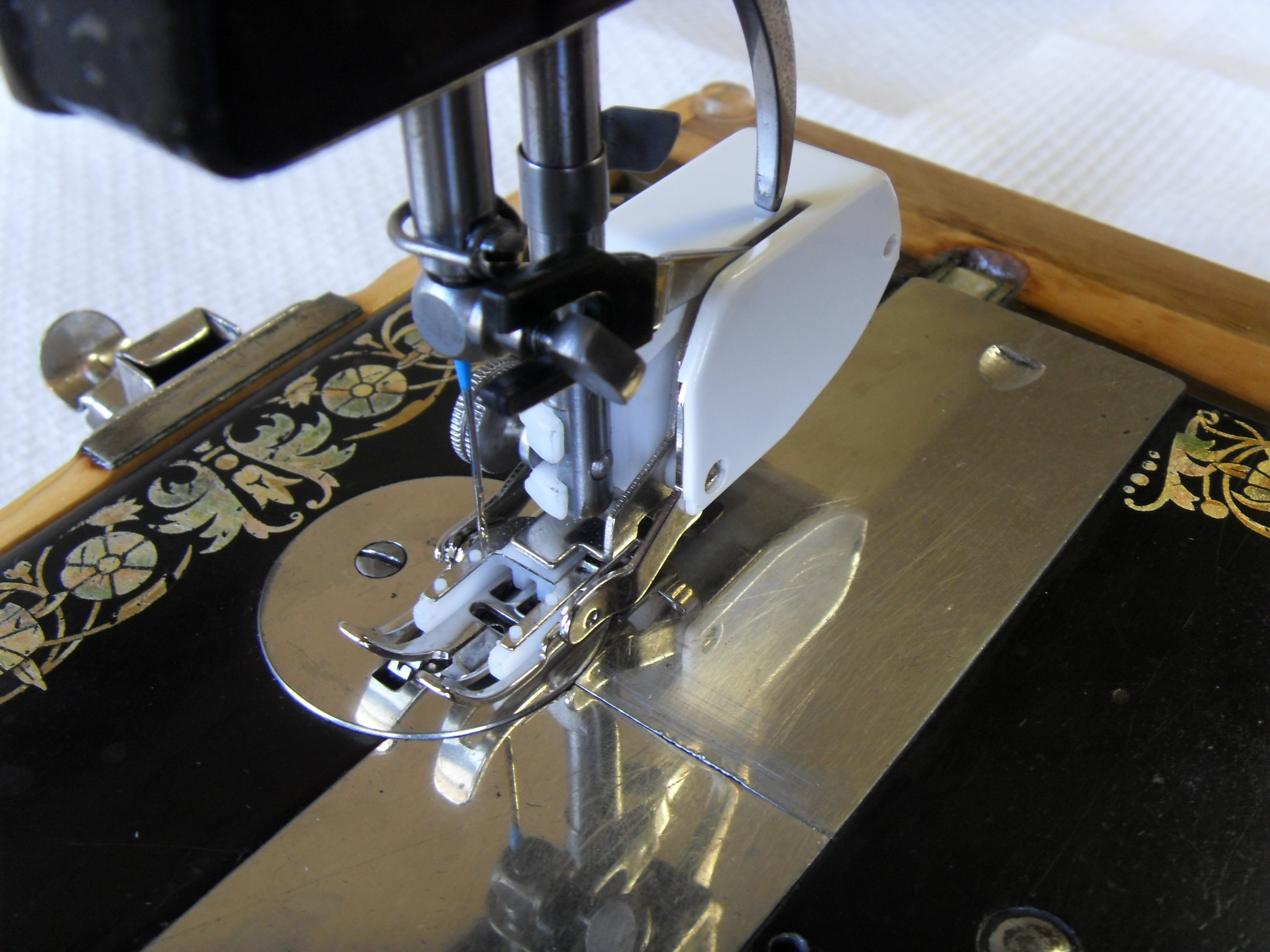
"Plaid matcher" substitute for a walking foot

A "plaid matcher" is similar to a walking foot, but unlike a walking foot it does not actually contribute any forward or backward feeding force. Rather, it applies cyclic downward pressure onto the material onto the feed dogs, in time with the feed dogs, so as to increase the friction between layers of the material. The increased friction reduces the slipping of lower layers (which contact the feed dogs) versus the upper layers (which tend to be held in place by the presser foot).

The plaid matcher's downward pressure is more helpful than that of the presser foot because the plaid matcher's foot can slide freely forward and back in order to move with the feed dogs. Consequently, it appears to be a walking foot, even though the only force it generates is downward.

The plaid matcher is powered by the machine's needle shank.
