= Presser foot =

Part of a sewing machine

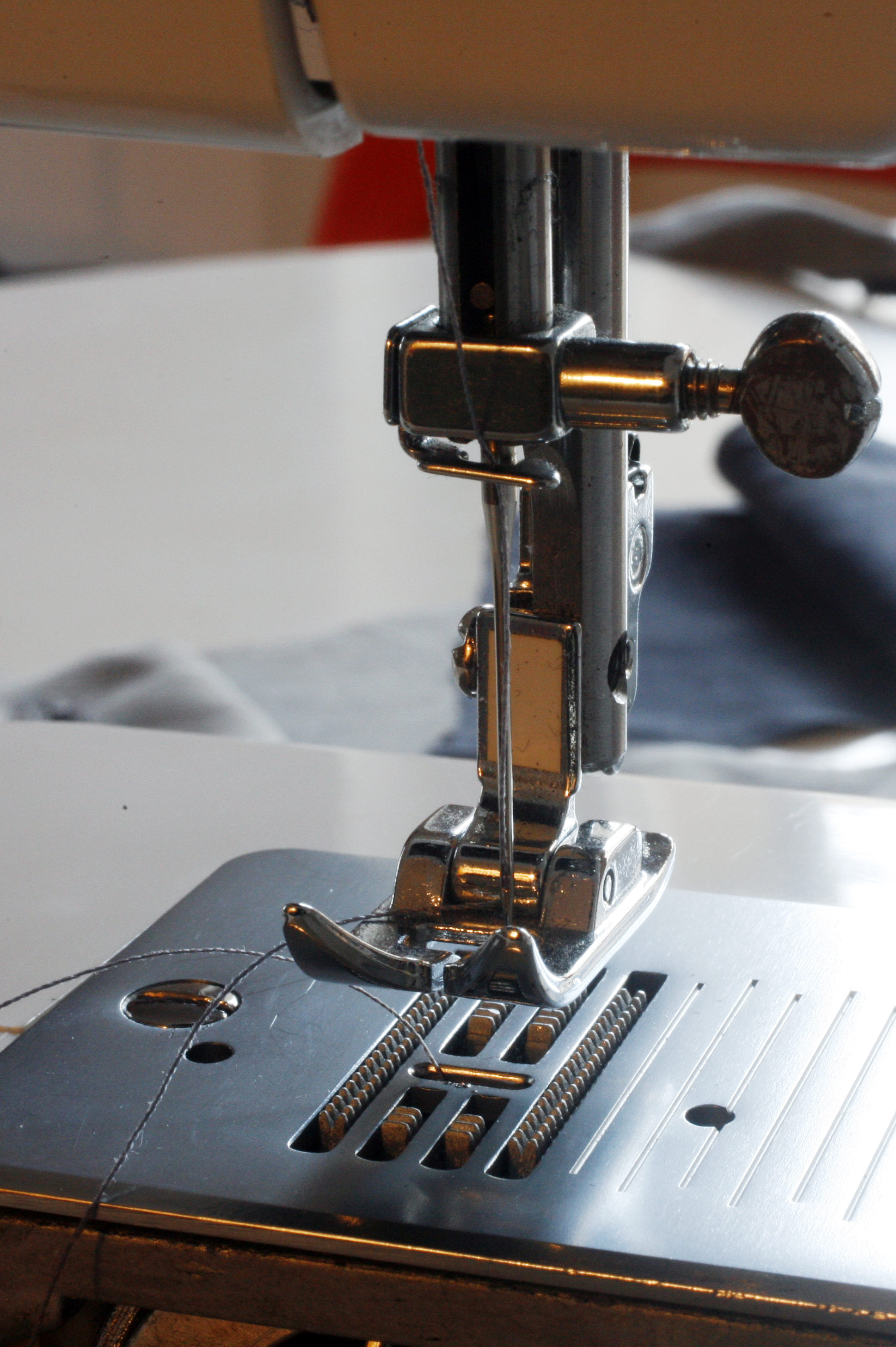
A sewing machine presser foot.

A presser foot is an attachment used with sewing machines to hold fabric flat as it is fed through the machine and stitched. Sewing machines have feed dogs in the bed of the machine to provide traction and move the fabric forward, while the sewer provides extra support for the fabric by guiding it with one hand. The presser foot holds the fabric down against the feed dogs, enabling them to apply forward force to the underside of the fabric, and keeps the fabric flat so that it does not rise and fall with the needle and pucker as it is stitched. It is typically spring-hinged, providing some flexibility as the workpiece moves beneath it while maintaining the correct level of force against the feed dogs.

The presser foot assists the feed dogs passively, contributing nothing to the forward force they apply to the underside of the workpiece. When especially thick workpieces are to be sewn, such as quilts, forward force may also be needed at the top of the workpiece and a specialized attachment called a walking foot is often used rather than a presser foot.

== Types of presser foot ==
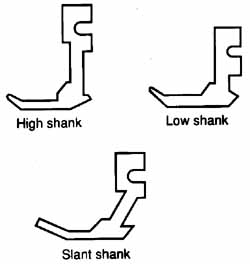
A diagram of the three principal types of presser foot— high-shank, low-shank and slant-shank— used in domestic sewing machines

=== Shank ===
Different manufacturers have produced machines with one of three types of presser foot shank in mind. These are the low shank, high shank, and the slant shank presser foot. A low shank presser foot has a 0.5 inches (13 mm) distance from the bottom of the foot to the center of the thumbscrew; a high shank foot has a 1 inch (25 mm) distance; a slant shank foot is distinctly slanted. The kind of foot a given machine requires is not interchangeable: a low-shank machine will only accept a low shank presser foot, and a high shank machine only a high-shank presser foot, though within these categories any low shank or high shank foot will fit any corresponding low shank or high shank machine; exceptionally, a slant shank foot can only be used with a Singer slant needle machine and no other (likewise, such a machine can accept no other kind of foot).

=== Feet ===
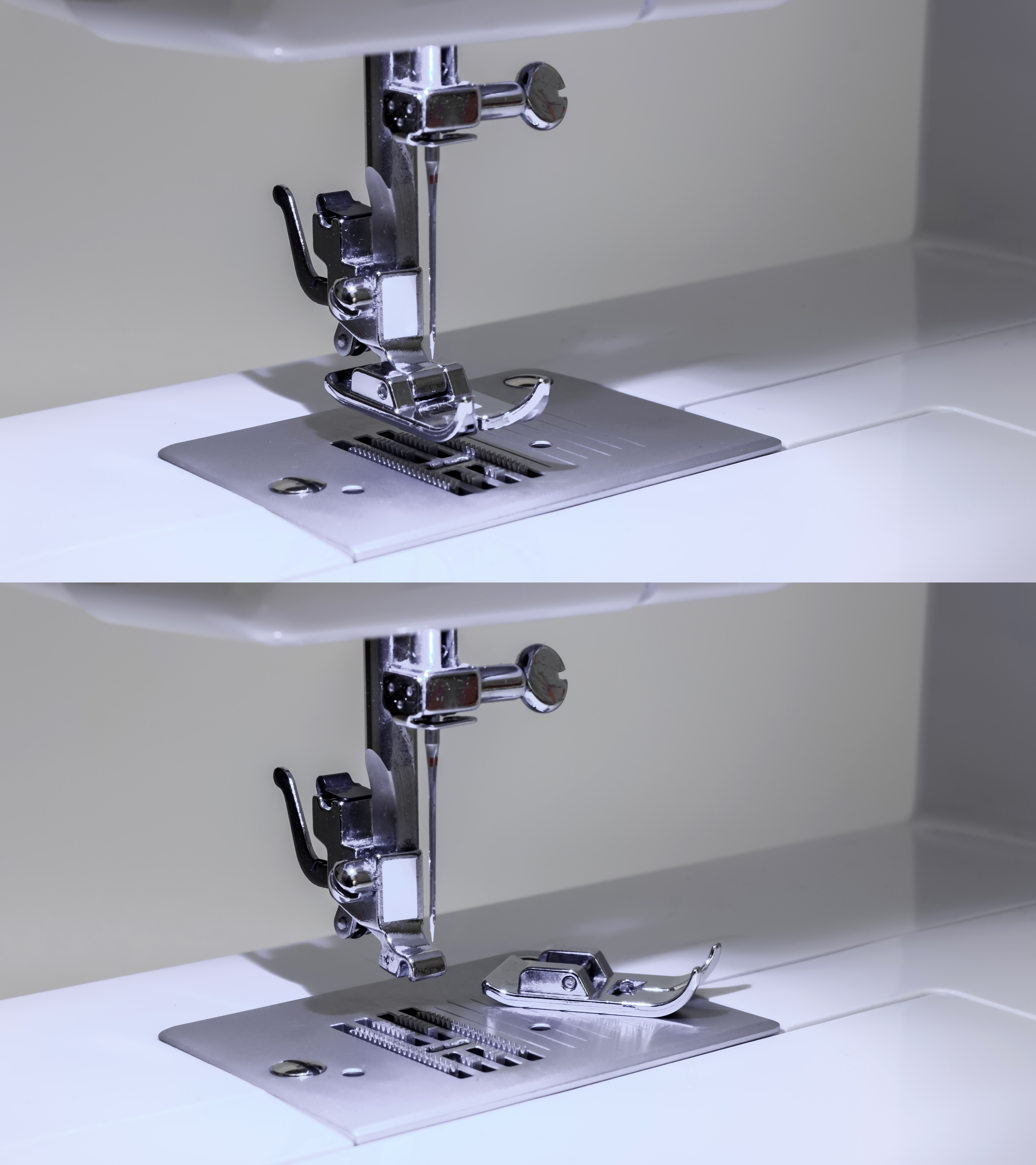
Snap-on presser foot on a Singer Promise 1409

The most commonly used presser feet are the all-purpose foot and the zipper foot, which come standard with most household machines. However, an array of specialized feet have also been designed for a number of uses. Among these are the following:

- binding foot, used to sew a long folded narrow strip of fabric that is wrapped around the edge of the workpiece
- blind hem foot
- button-attaching foot
- buttonhole foot
- darning foot
- fringe foot
- gathering foot
- invisible zipper foot
- narrow hem foot, or rolled hem foot (comes in different sizes measured in mm of the hem)
- open-toe foot
- overedge/overcast foot
- pintuck foot (comes in different sizes measured in the number of grooves)
- piping/ cording foot
- quarter-inch seam foot (6mm)
- quilting quarter-inch seam foot
- roller foot
- satin stitch or decorative stitch foot
- straight-stitch foot
- tape attaching foot used for narrow ribbons, rick-rack, etc.

Most presser feet are made of steel or clear plastic; however, presser feet made of Teflon or other non-stick material are used for sewing with leather, plastic, vinyl and oilcloth.
