= Nathaniel Wheeler =

American politician

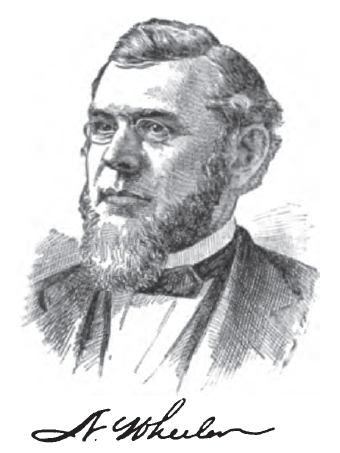
Nathaniel Wheeler

Nathaniel Wheeler (b. Watertown, Litchfield county., Connecticut, September 7, 1820; d. Bridgeport, December 31. 1893) was an American manufacturer and legislator. He became a Senator in Connecticut under the Democrats.

== Family background ==
He was the son of David and Sarah (née De Forest) Wheeler and grandson of Deacon James and Mary (née Clark) Wheeler. The founder of his branch of the family, Moses Wheeler, born in Kent, England, was in New Haven, Conn., as early as 1641, and probably was one of the founders of that town. He removed, in 1648, to Stratford, Connecticut, where he carried on his trade of ship-carpenter. He also farmed, and kept the ferry across the Housatonic.

He became an extensive landholder and died in 1698, aged 100 years. Sarah De Forest was descended from a Huguenot family, of Avesnes, France, some of whose members fled to Leyden, Holland, to escape persecution. In 1636 Isaac, son of Jessen and Marie (née Du Cloux) De Forest, emigrated from Leyden to New Amsterdam, and there married Sarah Du Trieux, who bore him 14 children. One of them, David, settled at Stratford. David Wheeler, father of Nathaniel, was a carriage manufacturer.

== Biography ==
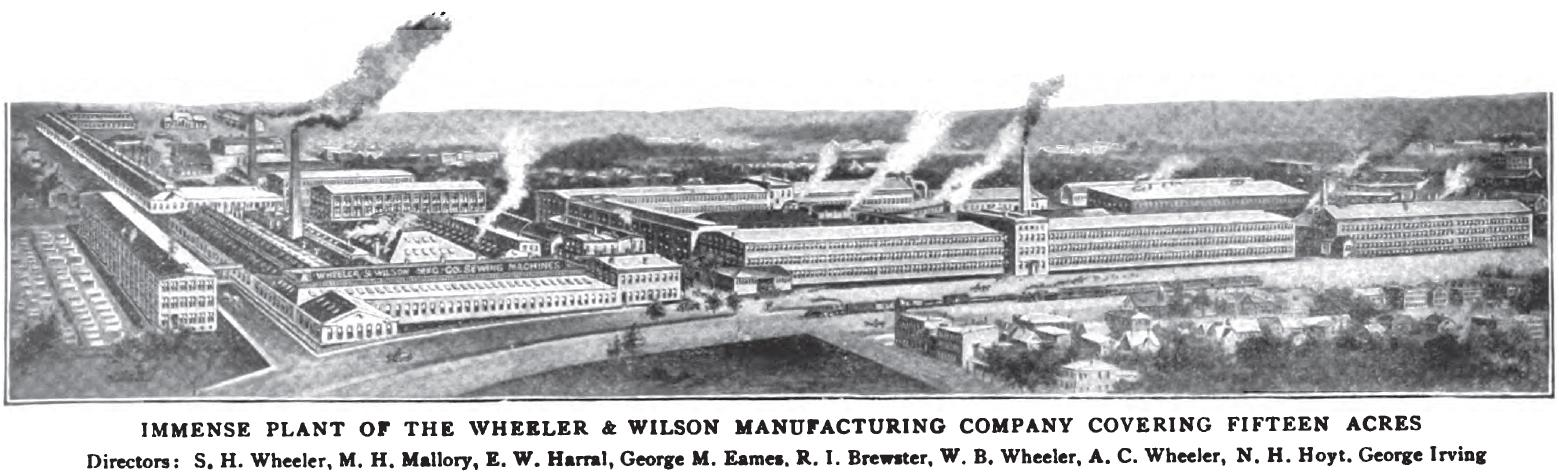
Plant of the Wheeler & Wilson manufacturing company

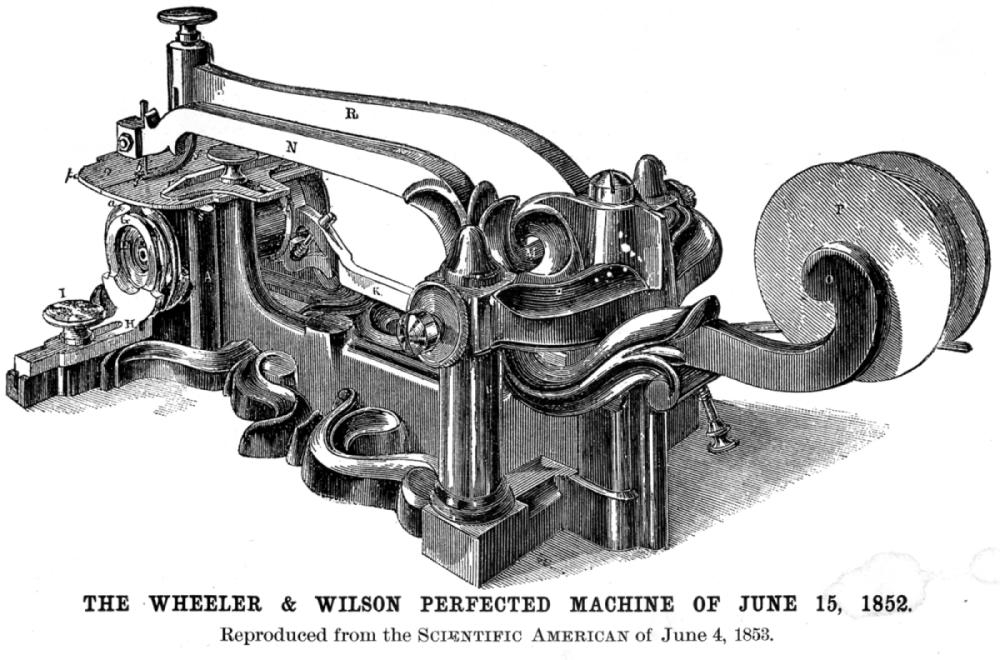
Wheeler & Wilson sewing machine from 1852

Nathaniel, after receiving a common school education, learned the trade, first taking up the ornamental part of the work. At the age of twenty-one he took charge of the whole establishment, to relieve his father, who had been carrying on a farm at the same time. He conducted the business successfully for about five years, and then began the manufacture of metallic articles, especially buckles and slides, using hand labor at first, but gradually introducing machinery.

In 1848 he formed a partnership with Messrs. Warren & Woodruff, manufacturers of the same kind of articles, and the firm erected a building for the business, of which Nathaniel Wheeler took entire charge. During a business trip to New York he saw the recently patented sewing machine of Allen B. Wilson, and contracting with the firm controlling the patent to build 500 of these machines, he engaged the services of Mr. Wilson as superintendent.

The latter was admitted to the firm of Warren, Wheeler & Woodruff, which in 1851 was reorganized as Wheeler, Wilson & Co., and in October, 1853, as the Wheeler & Wilson Manufacturing Co., with a capital of $160,000. For lack of adequate facilities, the business having increased largely, the firm, in 1856, moved to Bridgeport, Connecticut, occupying the old Jerome Clock Co. building, to which additions were made from time to time, until it covered about eight acres in 1899. Nathaniel Wheeler was made general manager on the organization of the company, and in 1855 was elected president, retaining his old office.

Nearly $500,000 had been expended upon experiments toward the perfecting of the machines, and since 1850 more than 2,000,000 have been manufactured. Nathaniel Wheeler took an important part in forming the combination, in 1856, of the principal sewing machine companies, the Singer and the Grover & Baker having begun business about the same time as Wheeler & Wilson.

He represented his district in the state legislature and Connecticut Senate as a Democrat in 1873 and 1874, and was one of the commissioners for the building of the state capitol at Hartford. He was a director of the New York, New Haven and Hartford railroad and of the City National Bank, an incorporator of the People's Bank, vice-president of the board of trade and of the board of education in 1885-86. He favoured every project to benefit Bridgeport and was held in high esteem.

Throughout his life, he received many honours and medals for his work at Wheeler & Wilson. The sewing machines of Wheeler & Wilson were exported abroad outside the United States as well. They were so renowned, that Nathaniel Wheeler received the imperial warrant from emperor Franz Joseph I of Austria as "Purveyor to the Imperial and Royal Court" (in German: k.u.k. Hoflieferant), keeping this title until his death.

== Family ==
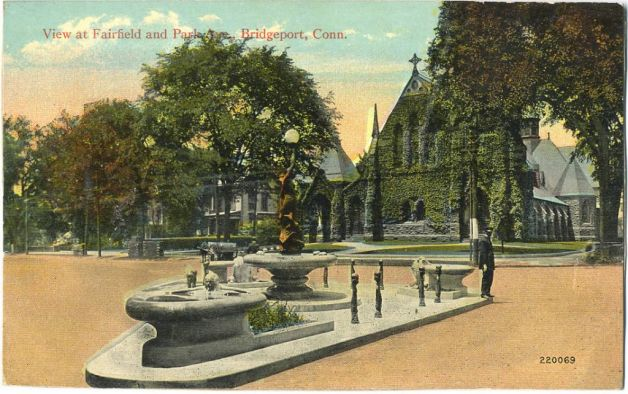
Nathaniel Wheeler Memorial Fountain in Bridgeport.

Nathaniel Wheeler was married twice: first, at Watertown, November 7, 1842, to Huldah Bradley, who bore him four children and died in 1857, leaving a son, Samuel, and a daughter, Ellen B., wife of Edward Harral; second, to Mary E. Crissey, who bore him four sons, two of whom, Archer and William Bishop, with their mother, survived. Nathaniel Wheeler died at his residence on Golden hill, Bridgeport, on December 31. 1893.

== Memorial ==
A memorial fountain was constructed in 1912 in Bridgeport in his honour. The fountain is located at the intersection of Fairfield Avenue, John Street and Park Avenue and was assembled by Gutzon Borglum. After years of deterioration, the fountain was renovated in 2009-2010.
