= White Motor Company =

Former vehicle manufacturer

Coordinates: 41.5328°N 81.6350°W

White Motor Corporation
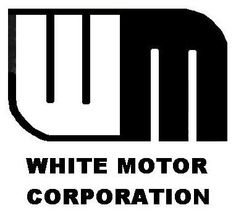
- Formerly: White Motor Car Company (1900–1906); White Motor Company (1906-1934)
- Industry: Manufacturing
- Predecessor: White Sewing Machine Company
- Founded: 1900; 126 years ago
- Founder: Thomas H. White
- Defunct: 1980 (company) 2021 (brand)
- Fate: Bankruptcy and liquidation, brand would continue until 2021
- Successor: Volvo, White Farm Equipment, Western Star Trucks
- Headquarters: Cleveland, Ohio, United States
- Products: Cars, Trucks, Buses, and Tractors

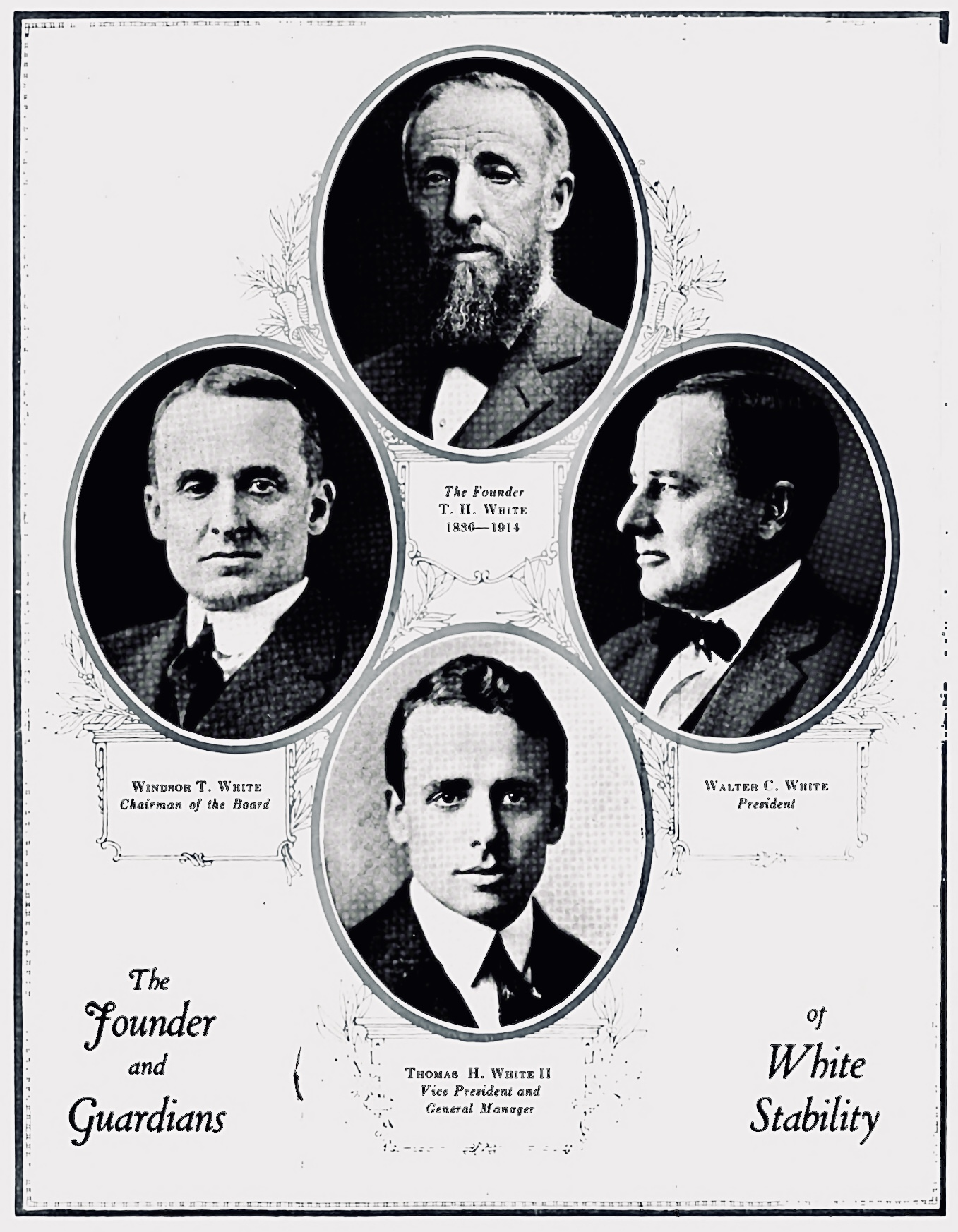
The founder Thomas H. White (1836-1914) and his successors.

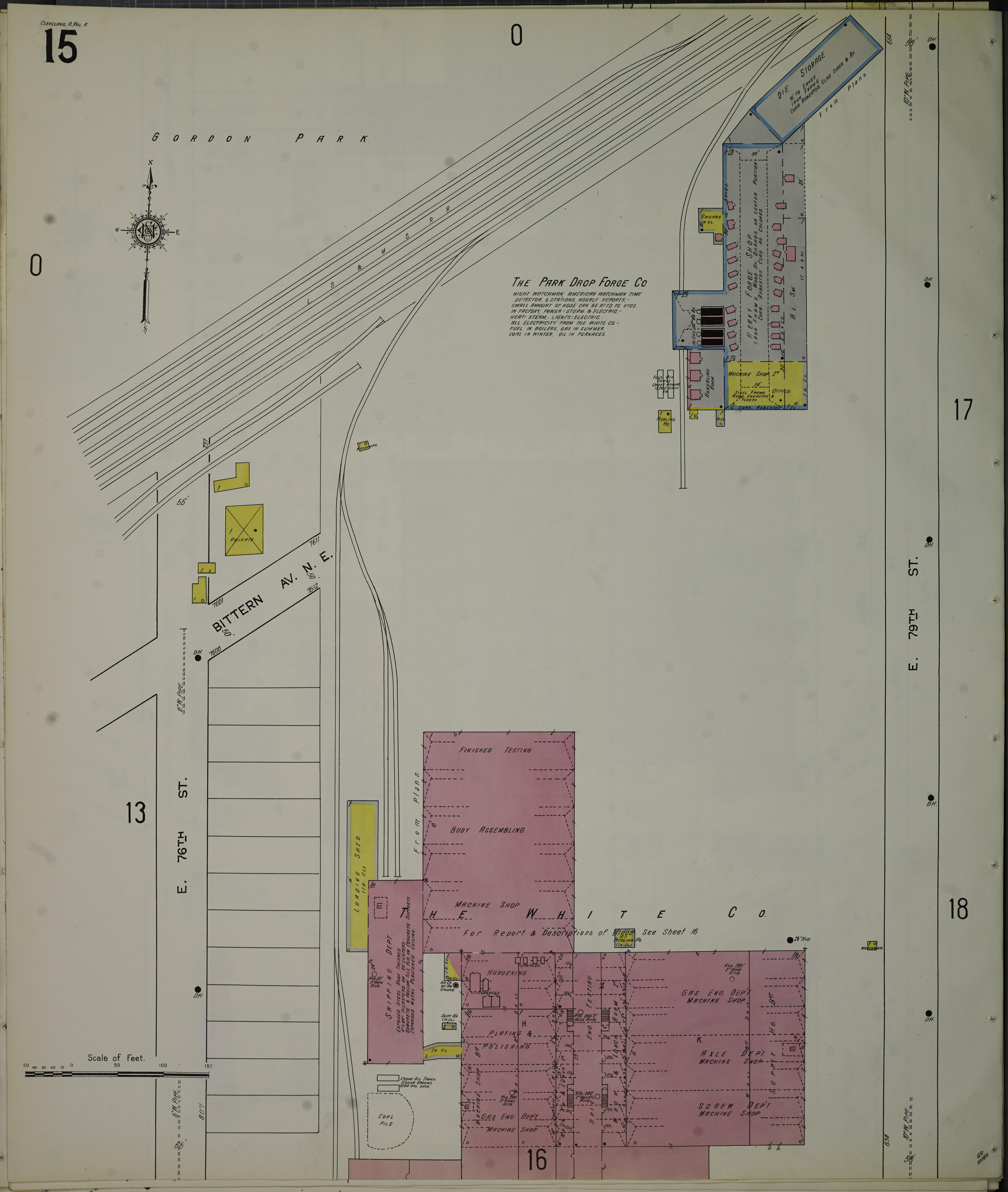
White plant 1912 (part 1)

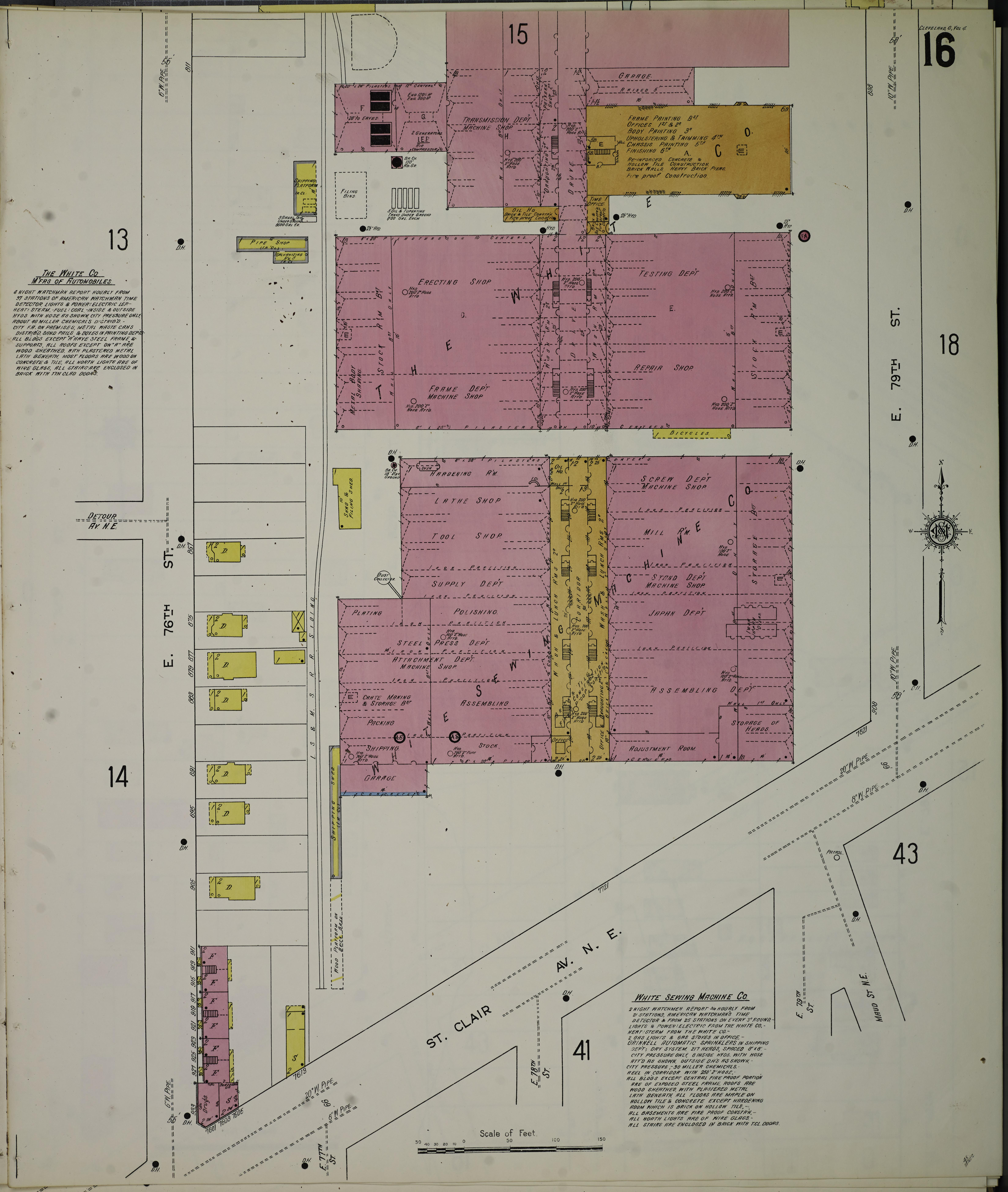
White plant 1912 (part 2)

White Motor Company (later renamed White Motor Corporation and commonly known as White) was an American car, truck, bus and agricultural tractor manufacturer from 1900 until 1980. The company also produced bicycles, roller skates, automatic lathes, and sewing machines. Before World War II, the company was based in Cleveland, Ohio. White Diesel Engine Division in Springfield, Ohio, manufactured diesel engine generators, which powered U.S. military equipment and infrastructure, namely Army Nike and Air Force Bomarc launch complexes, and other guided missile installations and proving grounds, sections of SAGE and DEW Line stations, radars, Combat Direction Centers and other ground facilities of the U.S. aerospace defense ring, such as the Texas Towers.

During the Vietnam Era, the company retained its position within the Top 100 Defense Contractors list (it ranked 87th in the Fiscal Year 1965, 77th in 1967, 73rd in 1968, 89th in 1969). Its production facilities, such as the Lansing Truck Plant in Lansing, Michigan, and the main plant in Cleveland were engaged in production, inspection, engineering services and maintenance of thousands of military/utility cargo trucks M39, M44, M600, and M602 series trucks, as well as spare parts, such as cylinder heads, diesel and gasoline engines with accessories.

== History ==
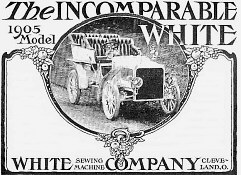
Advertisement for the White Sewing Machine Company's 1905 model

Around 1898, Thomas H. White purchased a Locomobile steam car and found its boiler unreliable. His son, Rollin, set out to improve its design. Rollin White developed a form of water tube steam generator which consisted of a series of stacked coils with two novel features: the first was the coils were all joined at the top of the unit, which allowed water to flow only when pumped, allowing control of the steam generation; the second was pulling steam from the lowest coil, closest to the fire, which allowed control of steam temperature. This second point was critical because the White steamer operated with superheated steam to take advantage of steam's properties at higher temperatures. Rollin White patented his steam generator, US patent 659,837 of 1900.

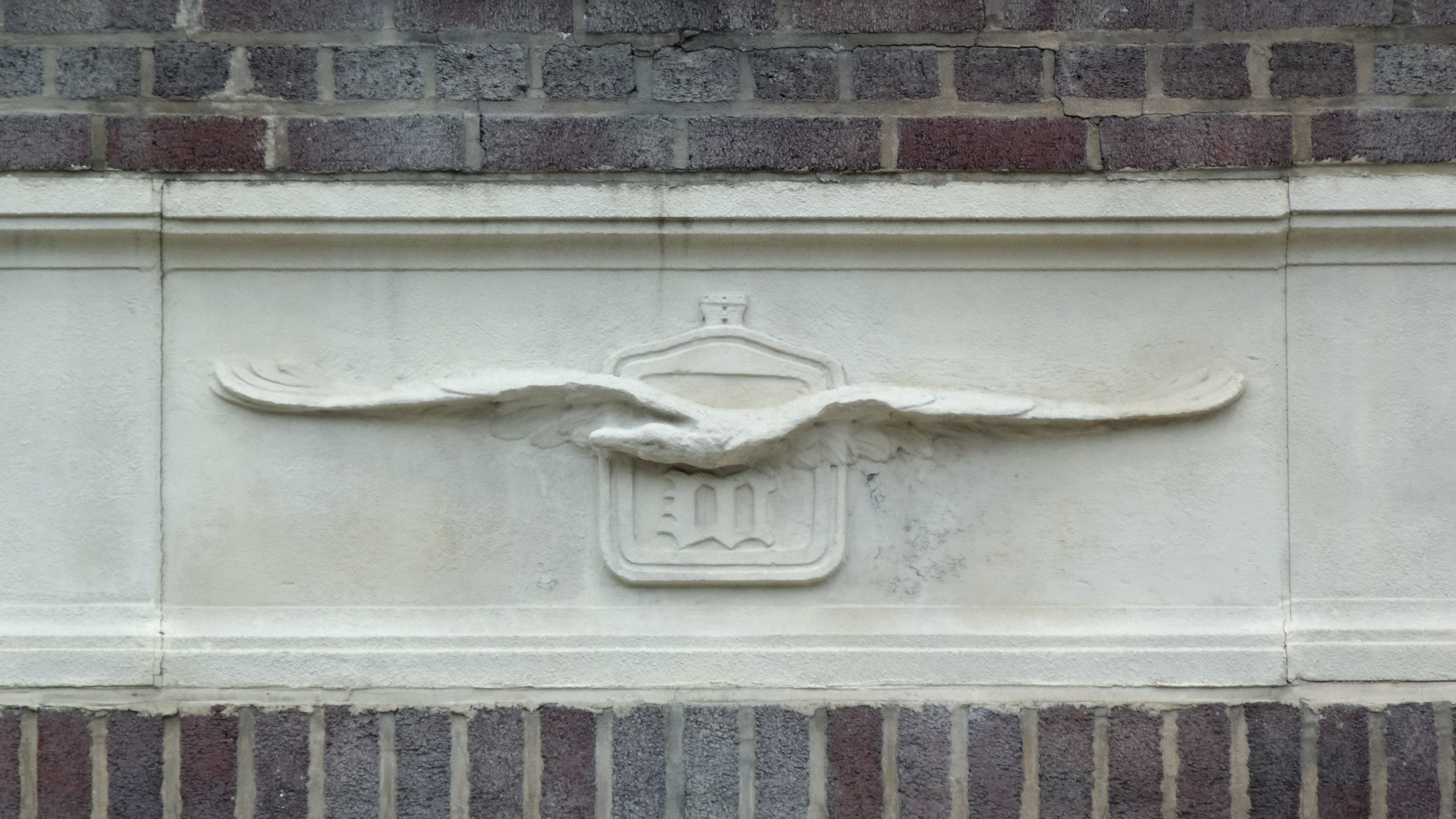
White emblem on a White dealer in Pittsburgh (built before 1923)

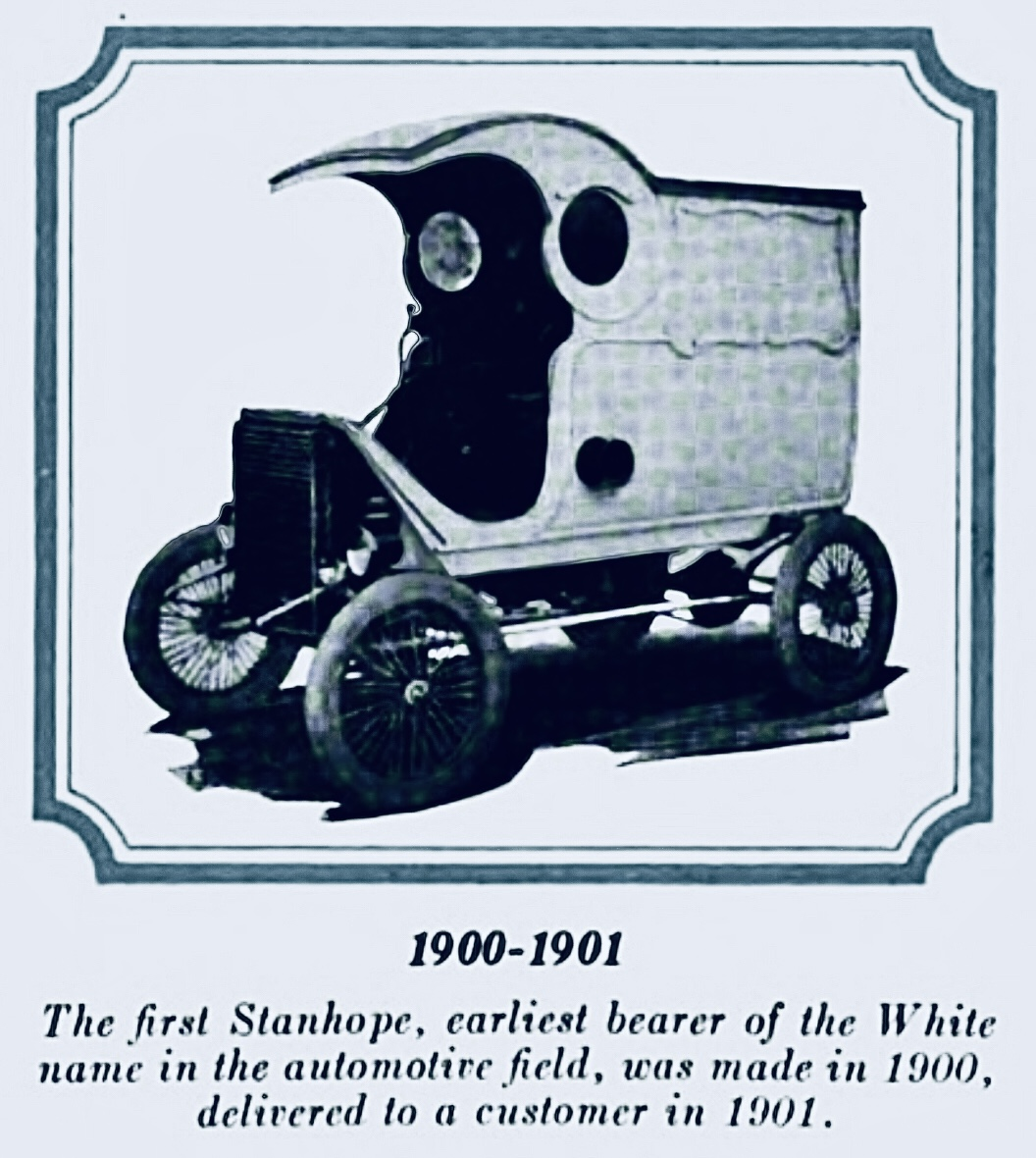
White's first vanModel A was manufactured in 1900 and delivered to a customer in 1901.

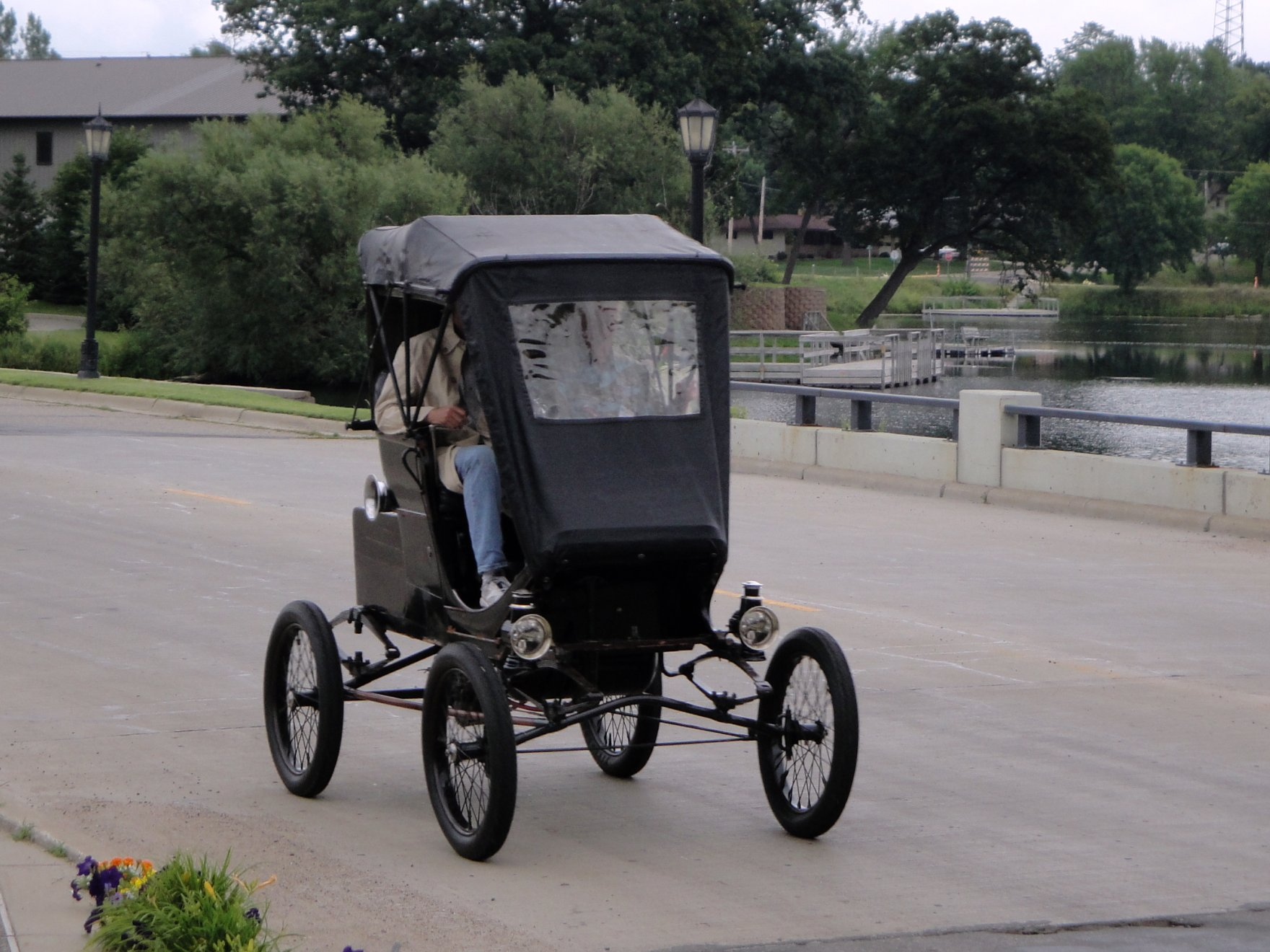
White Model B (1902)

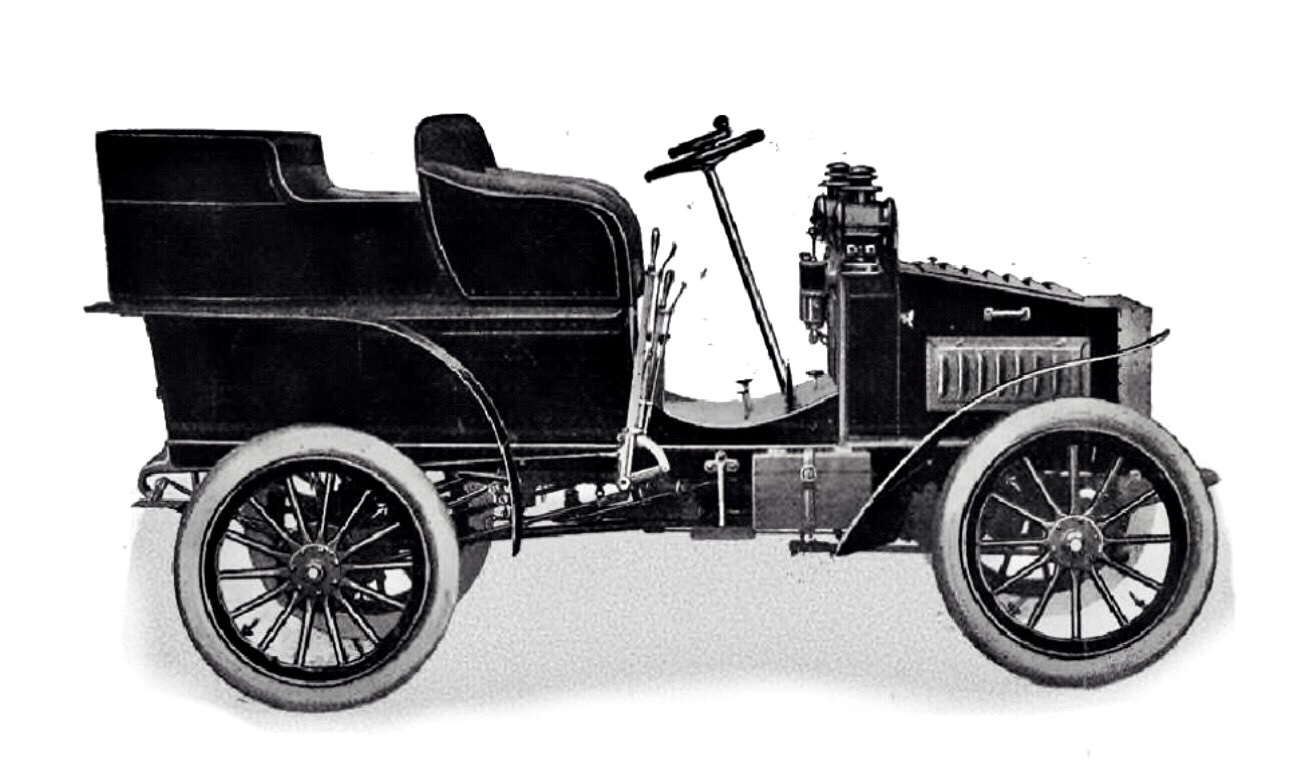
White Model C (1903)

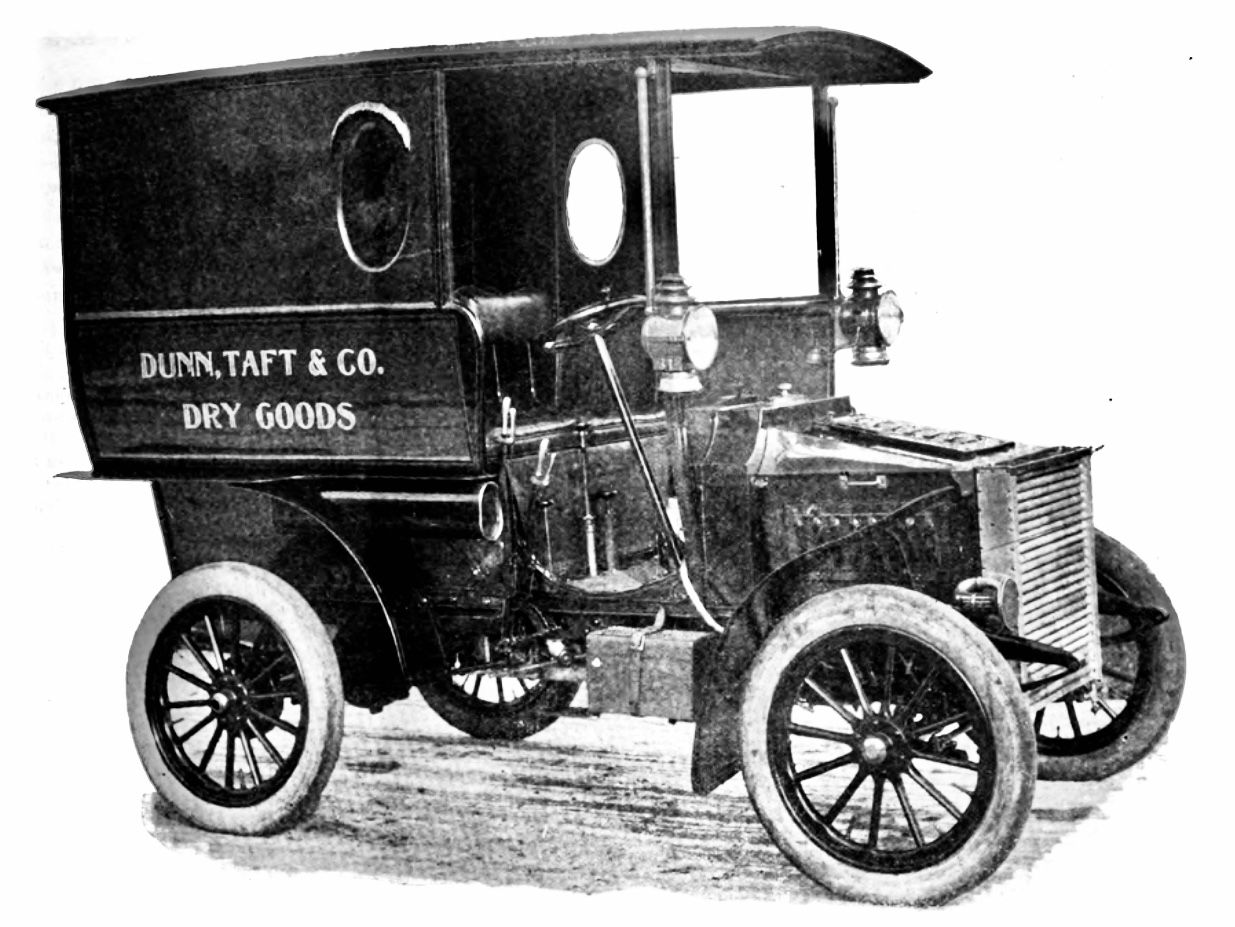
White Model C delivery wagon (1904)

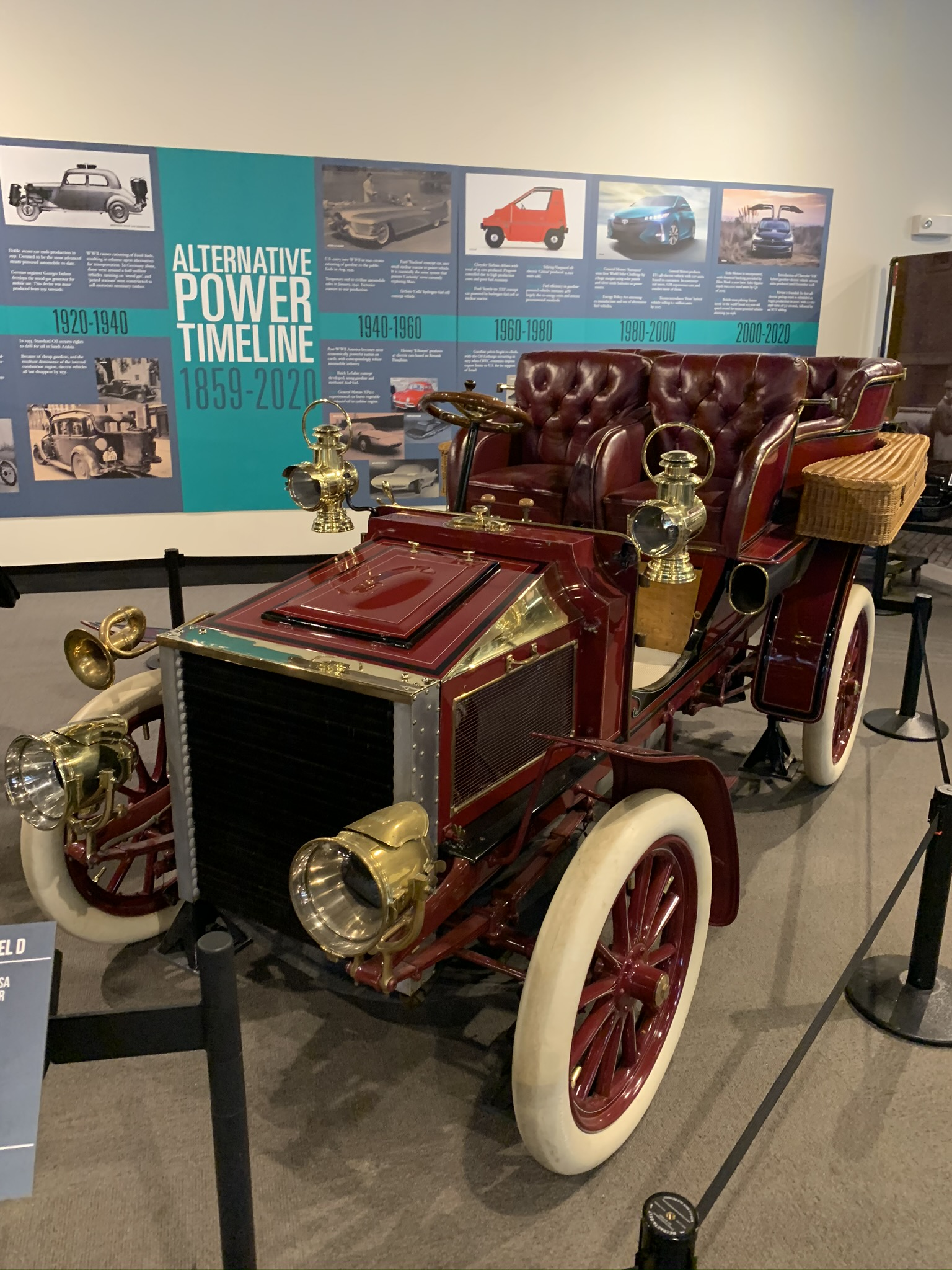
1904 White Model D

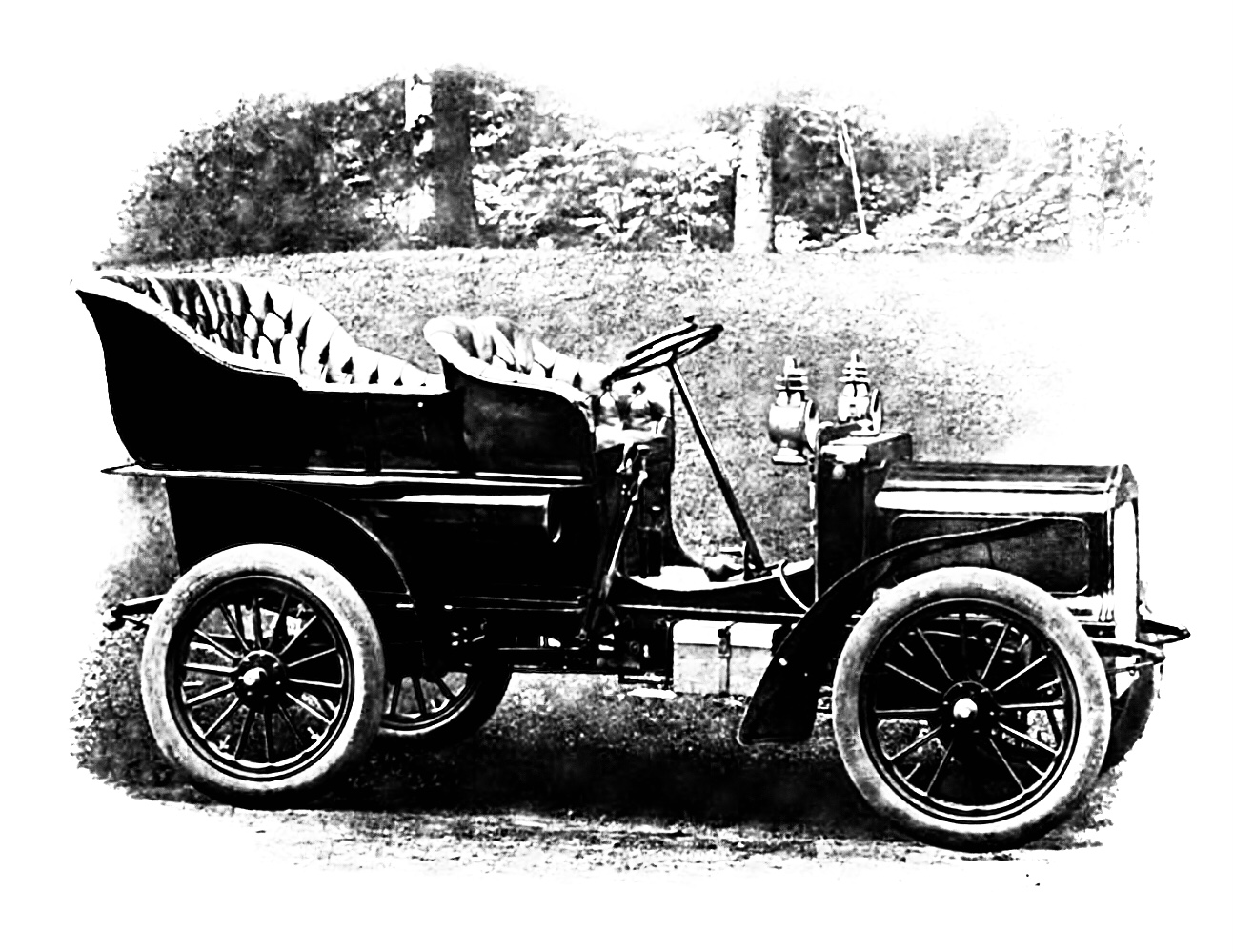
White Model E (1905).

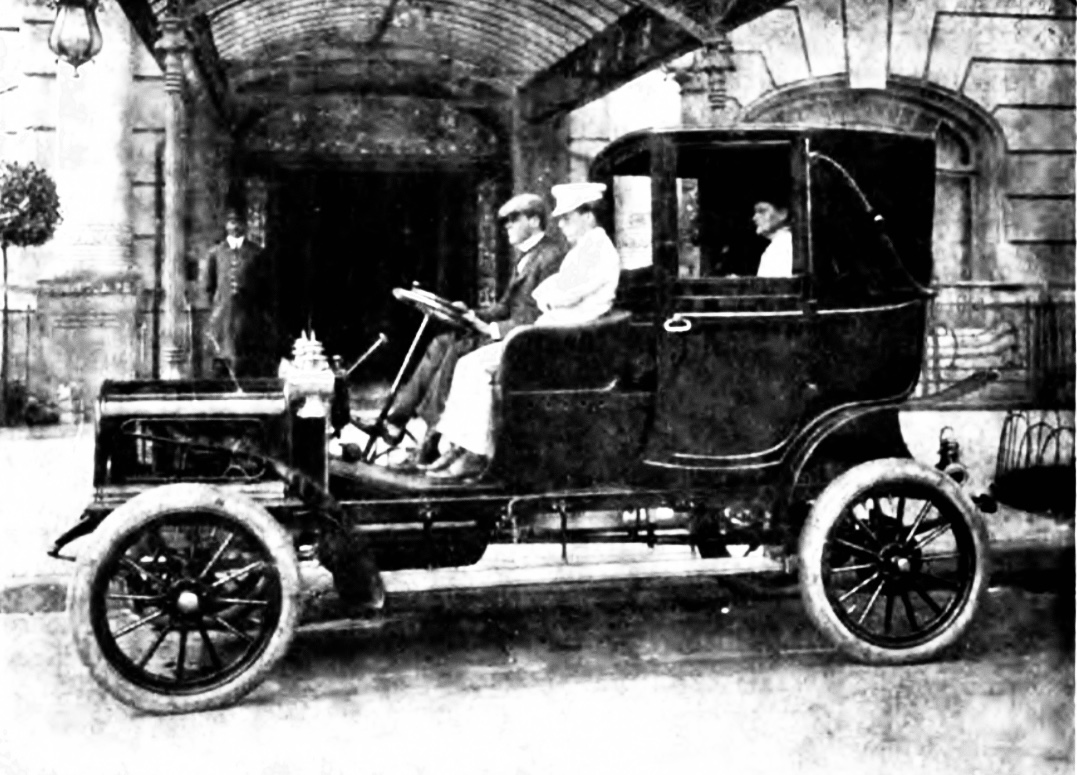
White Model F (1905).

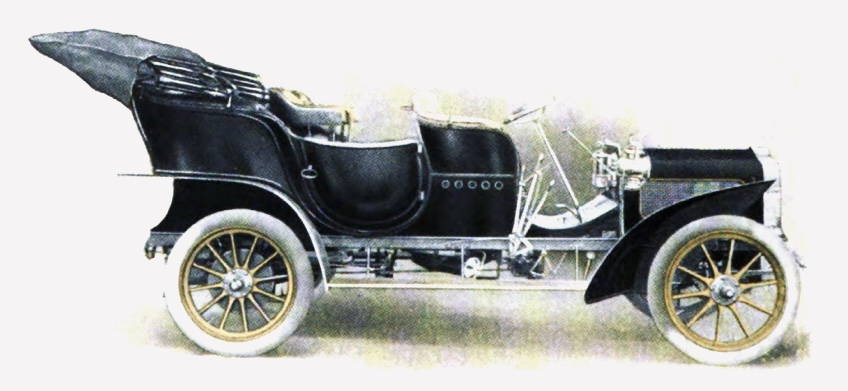
White Model G (1906) 30 hp

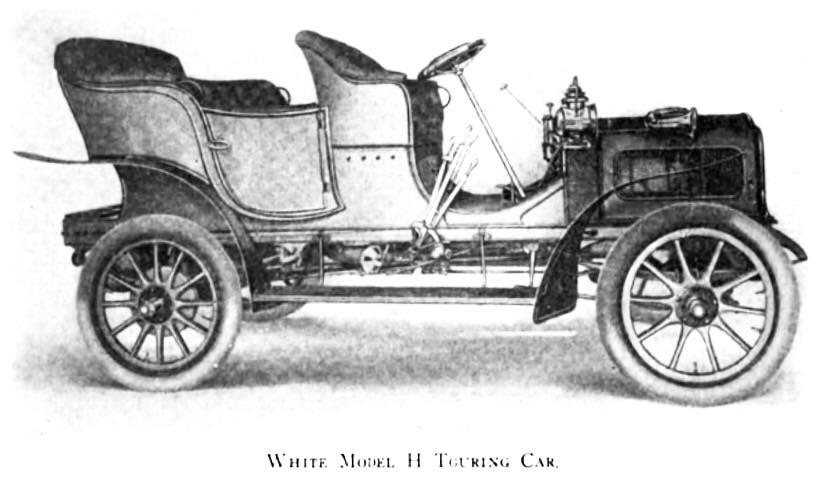
White Model H (1906)

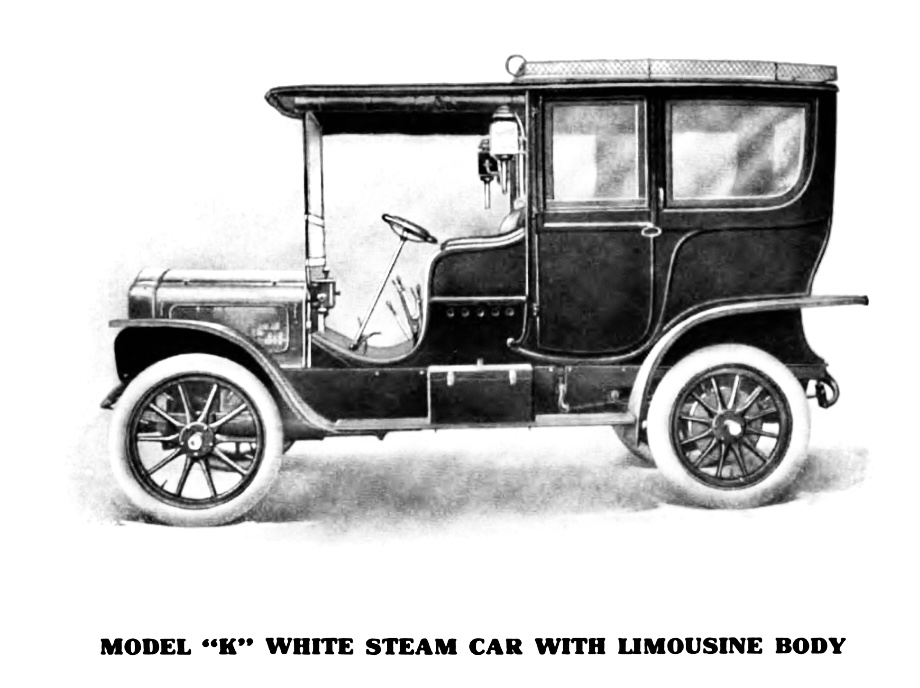
White Model K (1908).

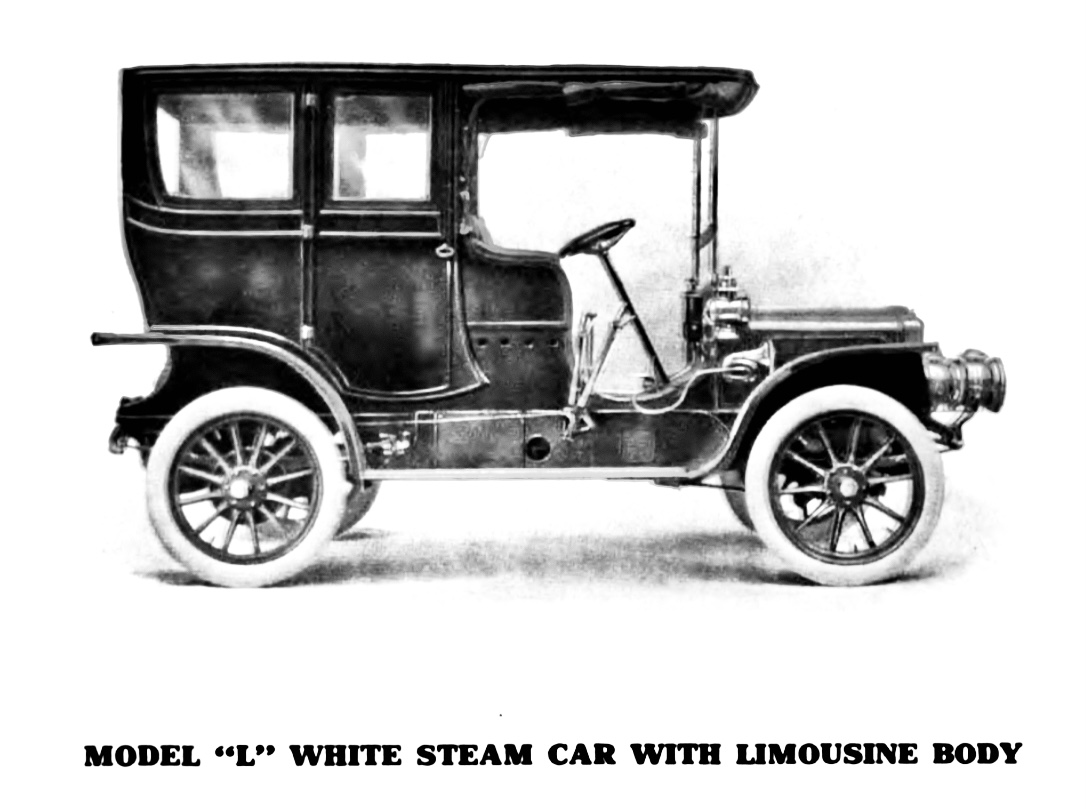
White Model L (1908).

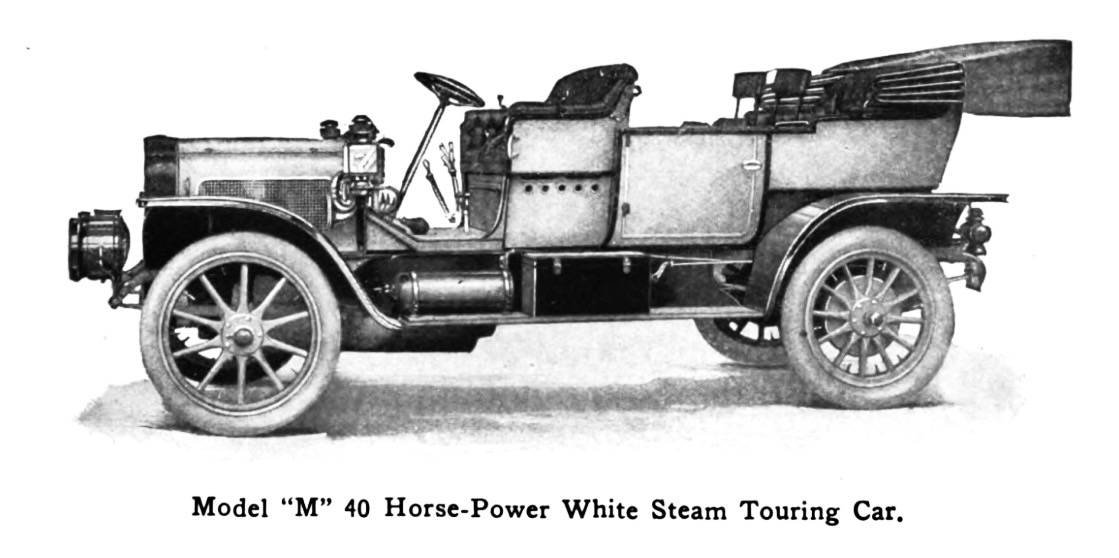
White Model M (1908)

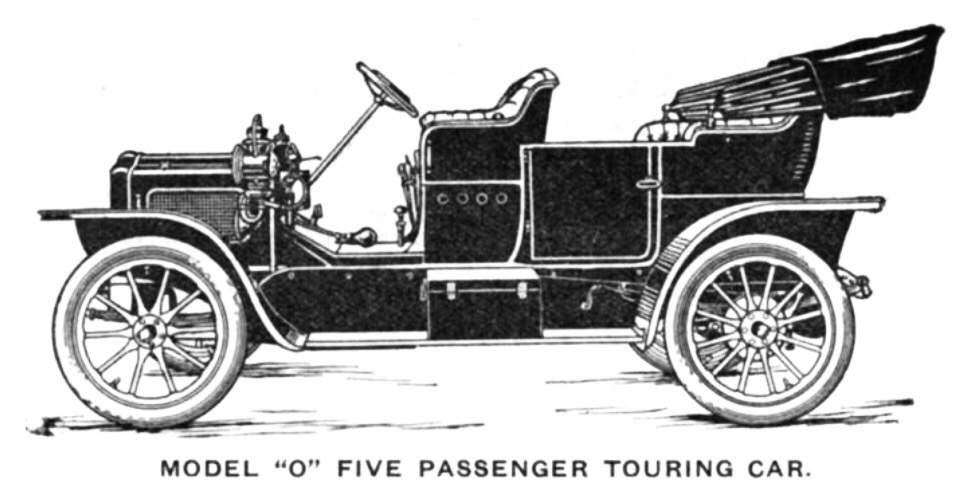
White Model O (1909)

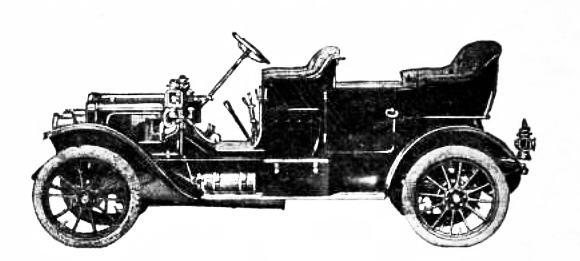
White Model OO (1910) 20 hp

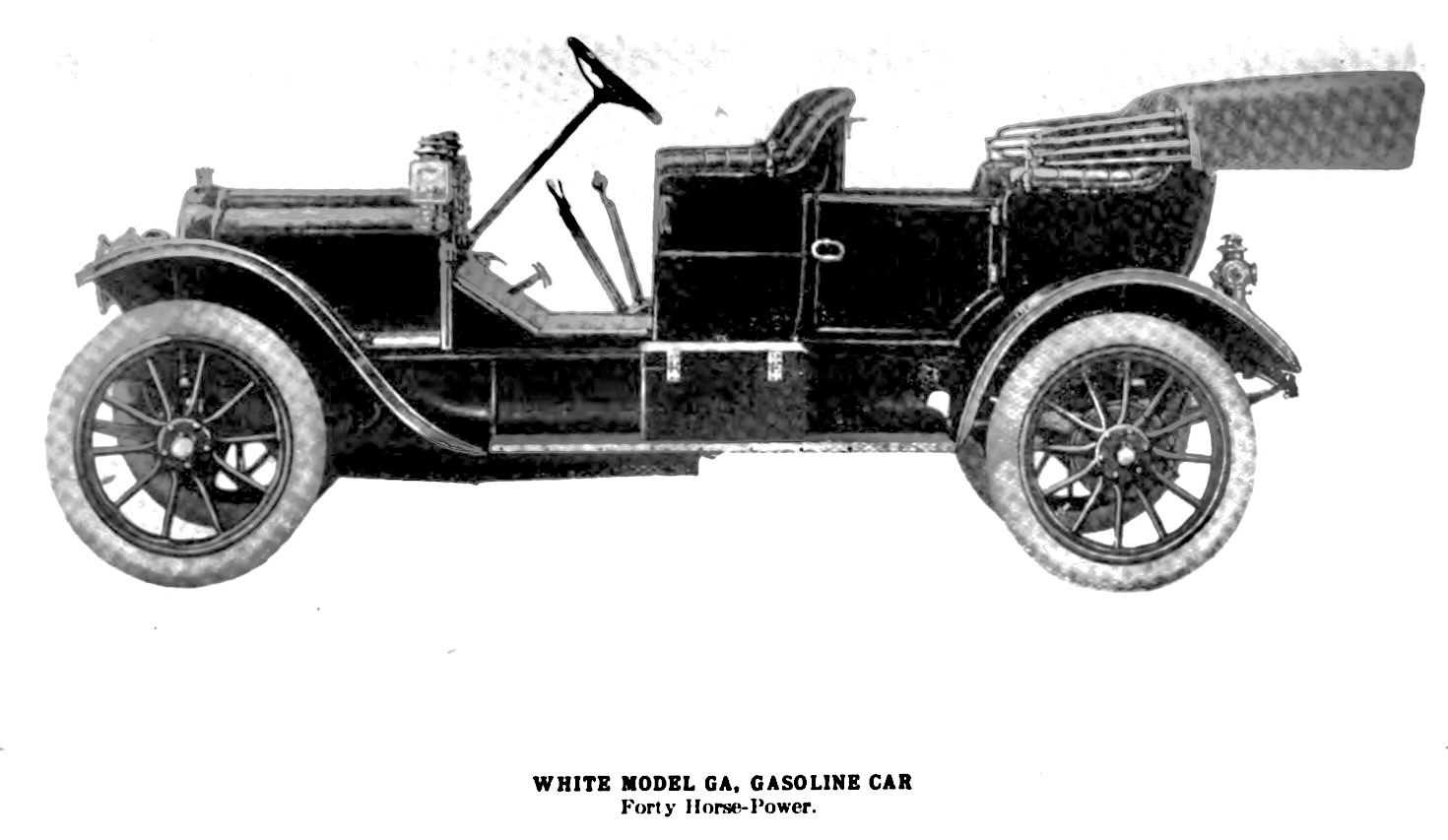
White Model G-A (1910-1911)

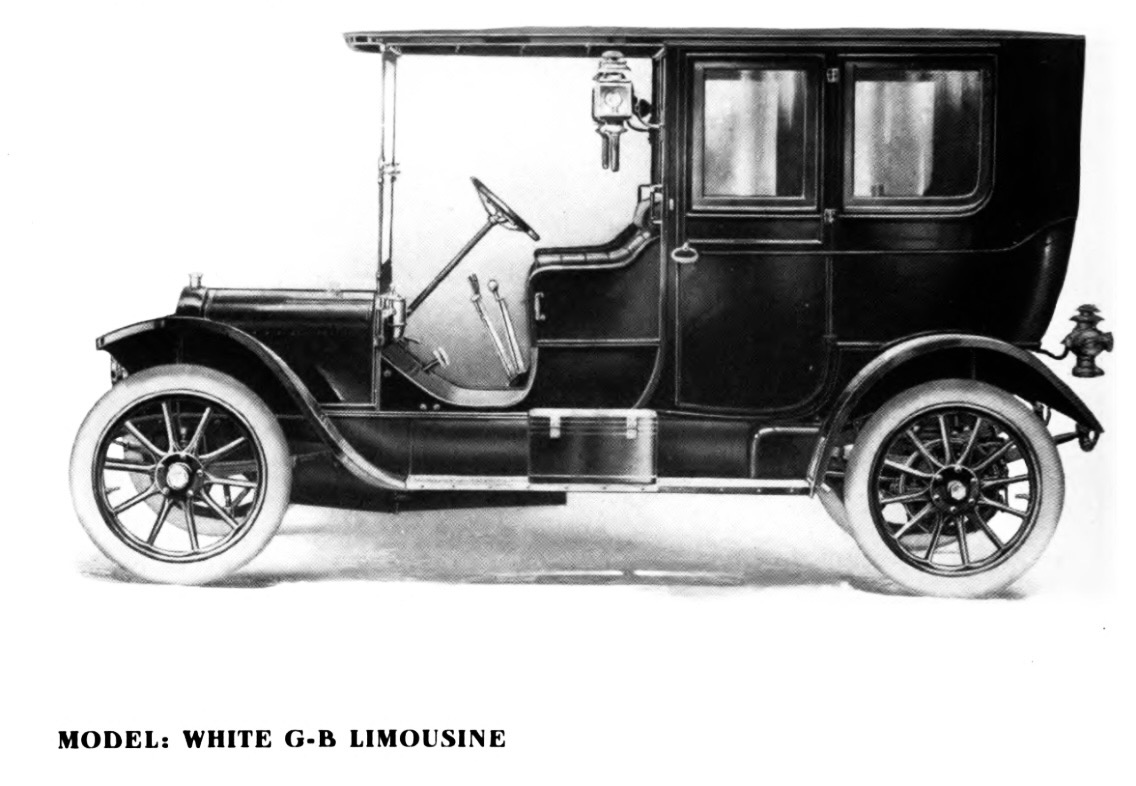
White Model G-B (1910-1912)

=== White Steamer ===
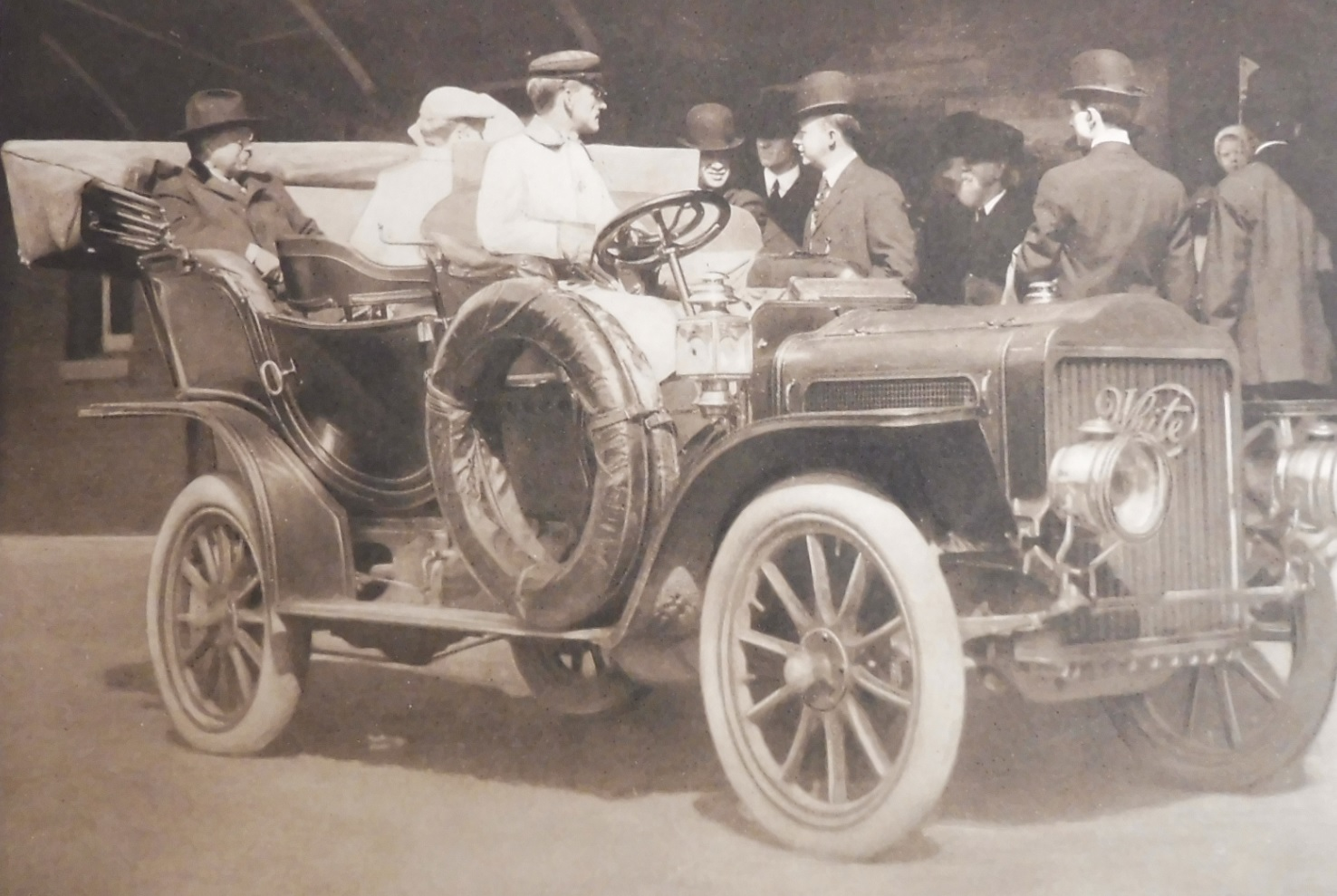
Theodore Roosevelt in a US Government 1907 White Model G 30 hp

Rollin H. White patented his new design and offered it to, among others, Locomobile. Finally, he persuaded his father, founder of the White Sewing Machine Company, to allow the use of a corner in one of his buildings to build an automobile.

White's brother, Windsor, who was a management talent, joined the business venture, followed by their brother, Walter, who became instrumental in the sales, promotion and distribution of the product. The first group of fifty cars were completed in October 1900, but none were offered to the public until April 1901 so the design could be thoroughly tested. Since the cars were being offered by the automobile department of the sewing machine company, White could not afford to diminish the reputation of the parent company by the introduction of an untested product.

In 1905, it became necessary to separate the automobile department from its parent company to accommodate the growth of the business and to physically separate them, as a fire in one could ruin both operations. On 4 July 1905, a racing steam car named "Whistling Billy" and driven by Webb Jay set a record of 73.75 mph (118.69 km/h) on the Morris Park Racecourse.

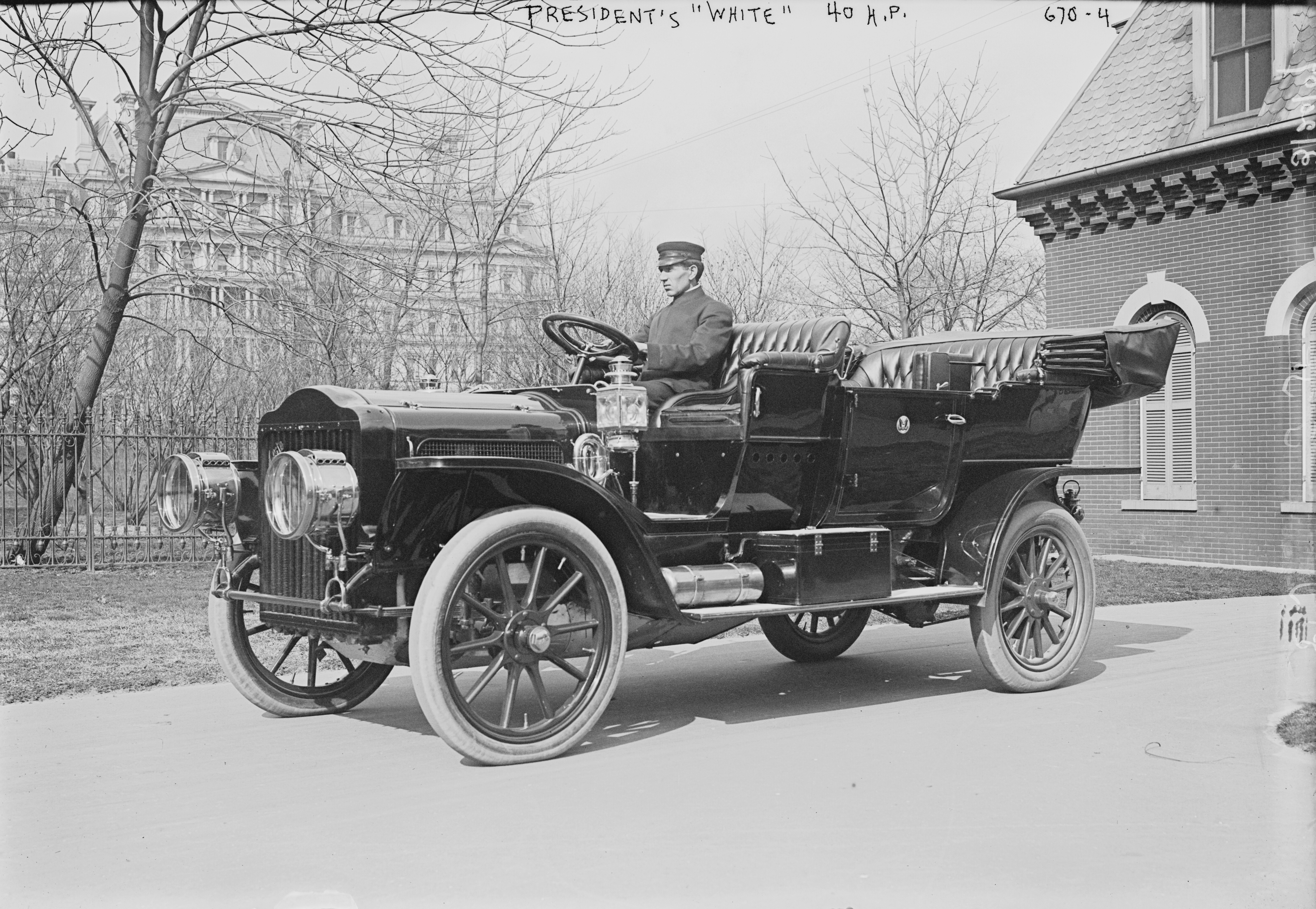
Taft's car

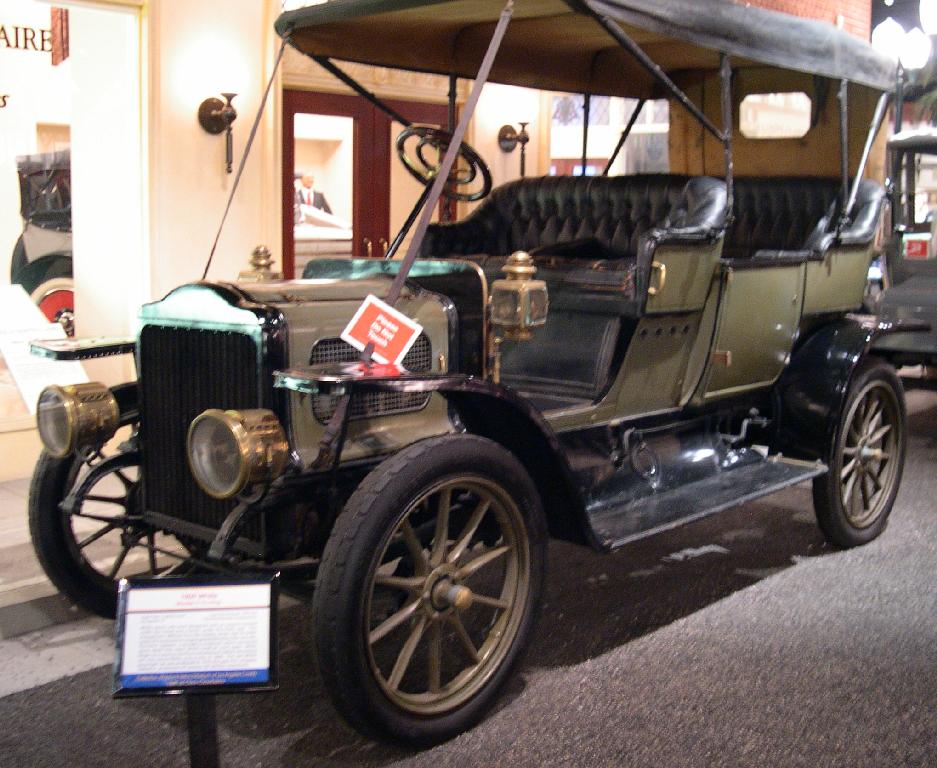
1909 White touring car at the Petersen Automotive Museum

A 1907 White Steamer was one of the early vehicles in the White House when Theodore Roosevelt, the 26th President of the United States, allowed the Secret Service to use the car behind his horse-drawn carriage. In 1909, president William Howard Taft converted the White House stables into a garage and purchased four automobiles: two Pierce-Arrows, a Baker Electric, and a 1911 White. This $4,000 car was one of the last steam cars produced and proved a favorite of the President who used bursts of steam against "pesky" press photographers. The 40 hp (30 kW) White Model M 7-seat tourer generated favorable press for the newly formed White Motor Company. Taft's White Model M is currently housed in the collection at the Heritage Museums and Gardens in Sandwich, Massachusetts.

The last steam car was built in January 1911 as the company made a transition to gasoline-powered vehicles. The company continued to show them in their catalogues as late as 1912. 9122 White steam-powered cars were built, more than the better known Stanley.

In 2019 Mitch Gross and Chris Rolph drove a 1910 model MM 40 hp White steam car from Beijing to Paris, likely the only time such a feat has been done by a steam car. The journey of over 8000 miles crossed 12 countries, 7 time zones and included the first crossing of a major desert (the Gobi) by a steam car.

The White steam car reentered popular culture in 2023 when comedian and classic car collector Jay Leno, while repairing his 1907 White steam car in his garage in Burbank, suffered third-degree burns on his face and hands when a fuel line sprayed him at the same time a spark ignited.

=== Gasoline Models ===
White companies' manufacturing facility expanded. The White steamer used unique technology, and it was vulnerable in a market that was accepting the internal combustion engine as the standard. White canvassed existing gas manufacturers and licensed the rights to the Delahaye design for the "gas car", showing a chassis at an English auto show in December 1908.

=== White Tractors ===
Rollin became more interested in agricultural tractors, and developed designs for tractors derived from standard White truck parts. When the White Company was not interested in producing tractors, Rollin set out to develop his own designs and, with brother Clarence, eventually founded Cleveland Motor Plow, which later became Cletrac tractor. Cletrac was later purchased by Oliver Tractor Co, which in of itself was bought by White in 1960. the early 1920s, Rollin briefly produced the Rollin car to diversify the tractor company, but found it could not compete in cost versus price against much larger manufacturers.

White was successful with their heavy machines, which saw service around the world during World War I. White remained in the truck industry for decades.

In 1979, White was having financial struggles and had to sell its tractor division, White Farm Equipment, to a Texas firm called TIC.

=== Truck Manufacturing ===
White Motor Company ended car production after World War I to focus exclusively on trucks. The company soon sold 10 percent of all trucks made in the US. Although White produced all sizes of trucks from light delivery to semi, the decision was made after WWII to produce only large trucks. White acquired several truck manufacturing companies during this time: Sterling (in 1951), Autocar (in 1953), REO (in 1957) and Diamond T (in 1958). White also agreed to sell Consolidated Freightways, Freightliner Trucks through its own dealers. White produced trucks under the Autocar nameplate following its acquisition. Diamond T and REO Motor Car Company became the Diamond REO division, which was discontinued in 1995.

A White Semi performed a role in the 1949 James Cagney film White Heat. This era was probably the peak of White Motor market penetration, with the substantial gasoline engined tractors moving a large part of the tractor trailer fleet.

White designed and (with other companies) produced the M3 Scout Car, the standard United States Army reconnaissance vehicle at the start of World War II. White also built the later M2, M3, M13 and M16 half-tracks.

In 1967, White started the Western Star division to sell trucks on the west coast.

=== White Buses ===
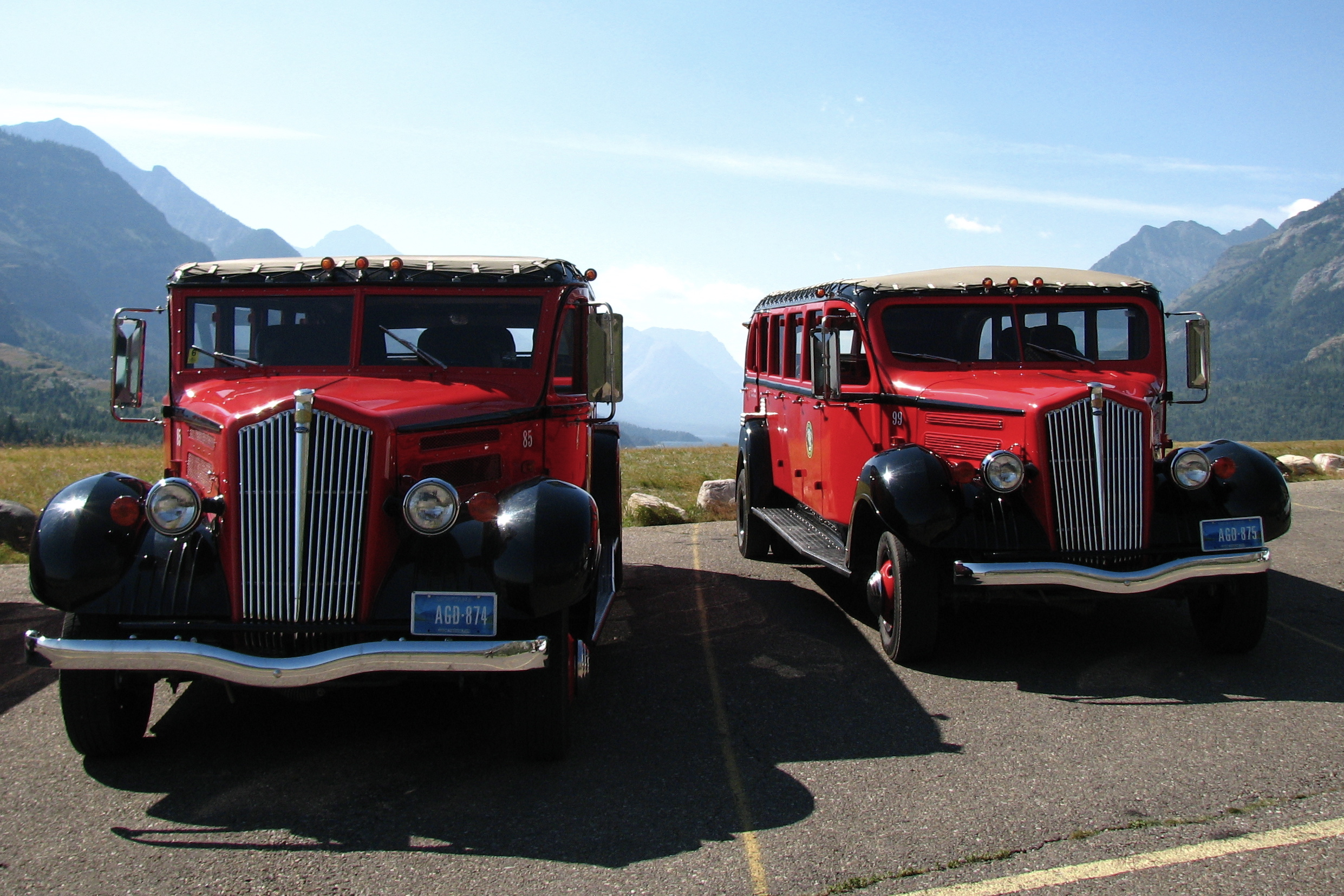
Two Red Jammers at the Prince of Wales Hotel

The White Model 706 chassis emerged as the winner of a four-way competition with Ford, REO and GMC, held by the National Park Service in 1935 at Yosemite National Park. Starting in 1936, White produced 500 of the Model 706, specifically designed to carry passengers through seven of the major National Parks of the western US; bus tours were offered as most tourists arrived from trains before World War II. The distinctive vehicles, with roll-back canvas convertible tops, were the product of noted industrial designer Alexis de Sakhnoffsky and used bodies from the Bender Body Company of Cleveland. They originally operated in seven National Parks: Glacier, Grand Canyon, Mount Rainier, Rocky Mountain, Yellowstone, Yosemite, and Zion. After being retired from service in the 1960s, many buses were sold to private collectors and tour operators. The Skagway Street Car Company assembled a fleet of eight buses starting in 1987, naming each bus for the location from which they were acquired.

Today, Glacier National Park operates 33 of its original 35 buses, where they are referred to as "Red Jammers", and eight (of an original 98) have been restored for renewed service in Yellowstone National Park. Glacier's 33 buses were refurbished by Ford and TransGlobal in 2000–2002, while Yellowstone's eight buses were refurbished by TransGlobal in 2007. Glacier has kept one bus in original condition. Yellowstone has five White buses in original condition, two model 706s and three older units as well. In addition, a private operator uses two of the White 706 buses originally built for Yellowstone for Gettysburg National Battlefield tours. One ex-Mount Rainier White 706 is on display at the Longmire Historic District.

The bus driven by Egg Shen in the film Big Trouble in Little China into Chinatown, San Francisco is a White 706 which was later purchased by the Skagway Street Car Company. It was one of the eight sold to Xanterra in 2001; they were subsequently restored by TransGlobal for tours in Yellowstone. The character "Ol Jammer" from the Disney animated film Planes: Fire and Rescue is based on the White 706.

In addition to the National Parks touring buses, White built similar buses with fixed roofs for intercity service. White entered the transit bus market in 1937 with the 700 series, available in 30-and-35-foot (9.1 and 10.7 m) lengths. The longer model was produced through 1953, with an update in 1948 as the 1100 series.

=== Company Culture ===
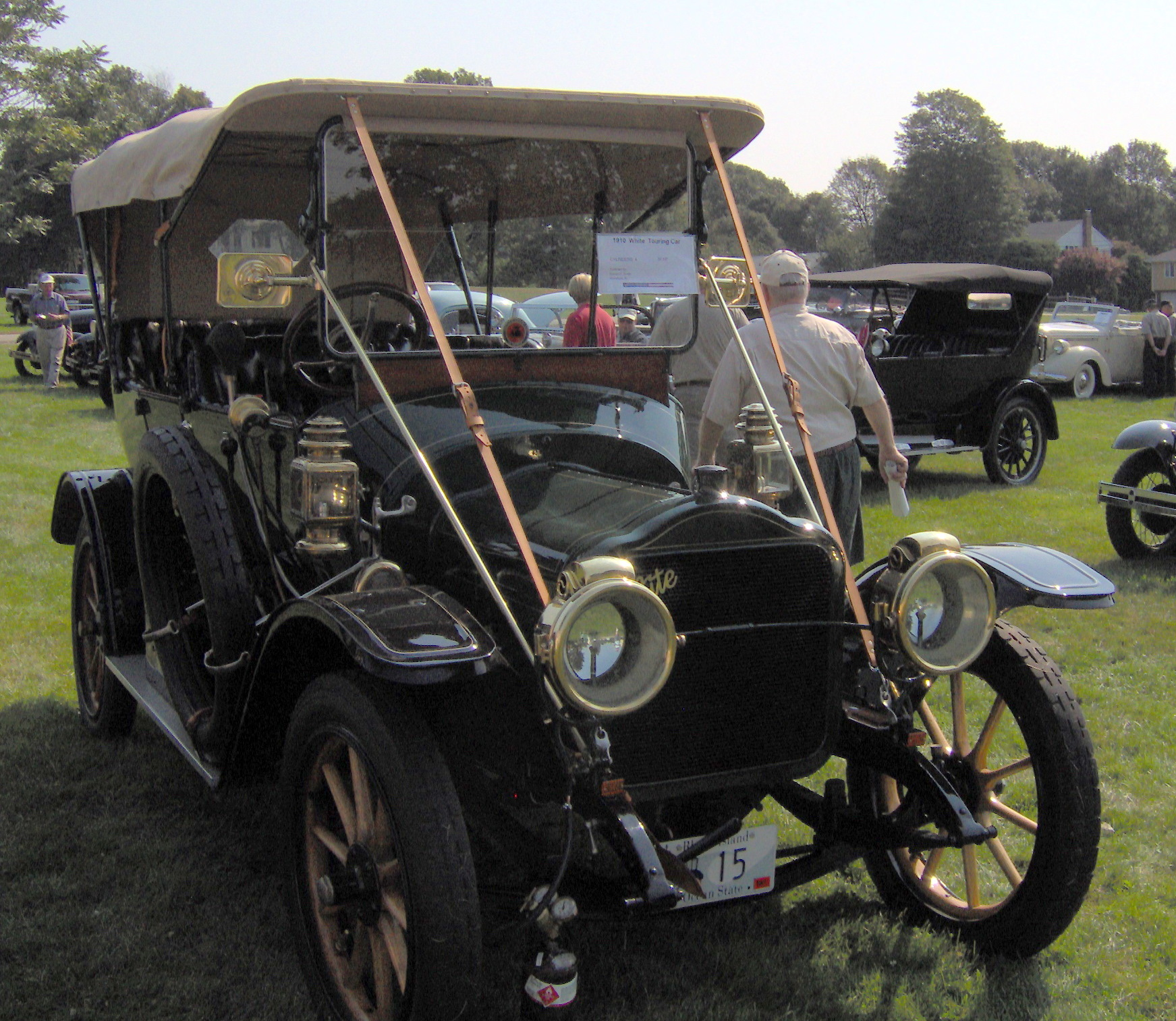
1910 White touring car

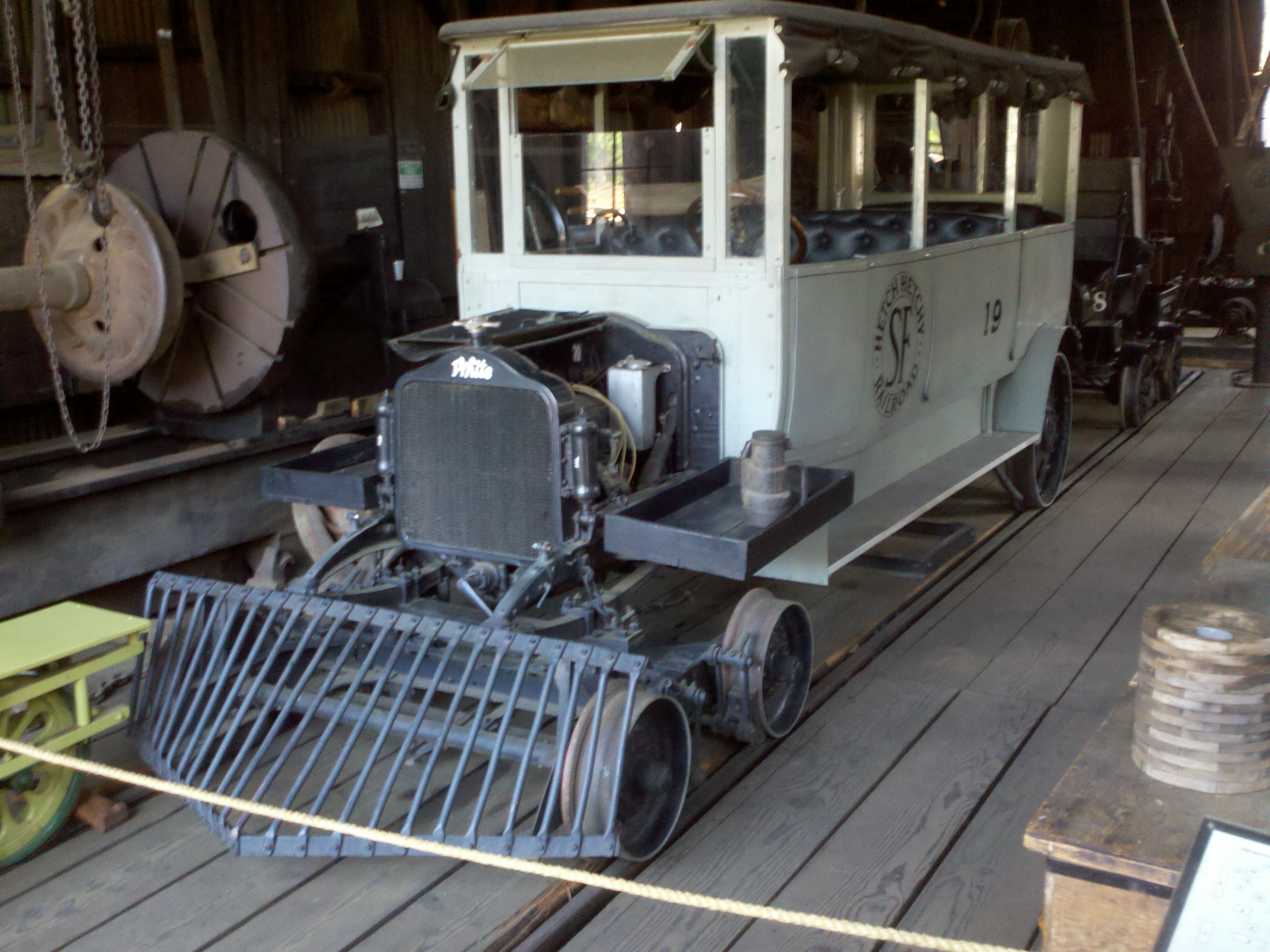
White railcar in the collection of the Railtown 1897 State Historic Park

During the time brothers Walter and Windsor White ran the company, it offered a library branch, a store which sold necessities at low cost, sports teams, and concerts by orchestras and jazz bands, as well as musical performances by the workers, many of whom were immigrants from Slovenia and Poland. The company also had picnics at Euclid Beach Park.

After Walter White was fatally injured in a traffic accident, management changed and so did the firm's culture. Employees started one of the country's first automobile unions. The Great Depression caused a drop in sales, forcing White to merge with Studebaker. However, White soon became independent again.

In 1935, Robert Fager Black became president, but workers were still unhappy, and they went on strike. Black negotiated with the workers who were striking, and he even got baseball equipment for them and let them play while on strike, so they would have something to do. Black learned people's names, visited the plant frequently, and asked customers if they were happy with what they purchased. Anyone could visit his office.

Black brought the company back to where it had once been by World War II, during which the company supplied the military with much of its equipment. White ranked 54th among US corporations in the value of World War II military production contracts. When husbands went to serve, wives took their jobs, and the work force totaled over 4000. Black provided the services the company had at one time, and helped employees get to work with carpools.

Black retired in 1956, still beloved by employees.

=== Demise ===
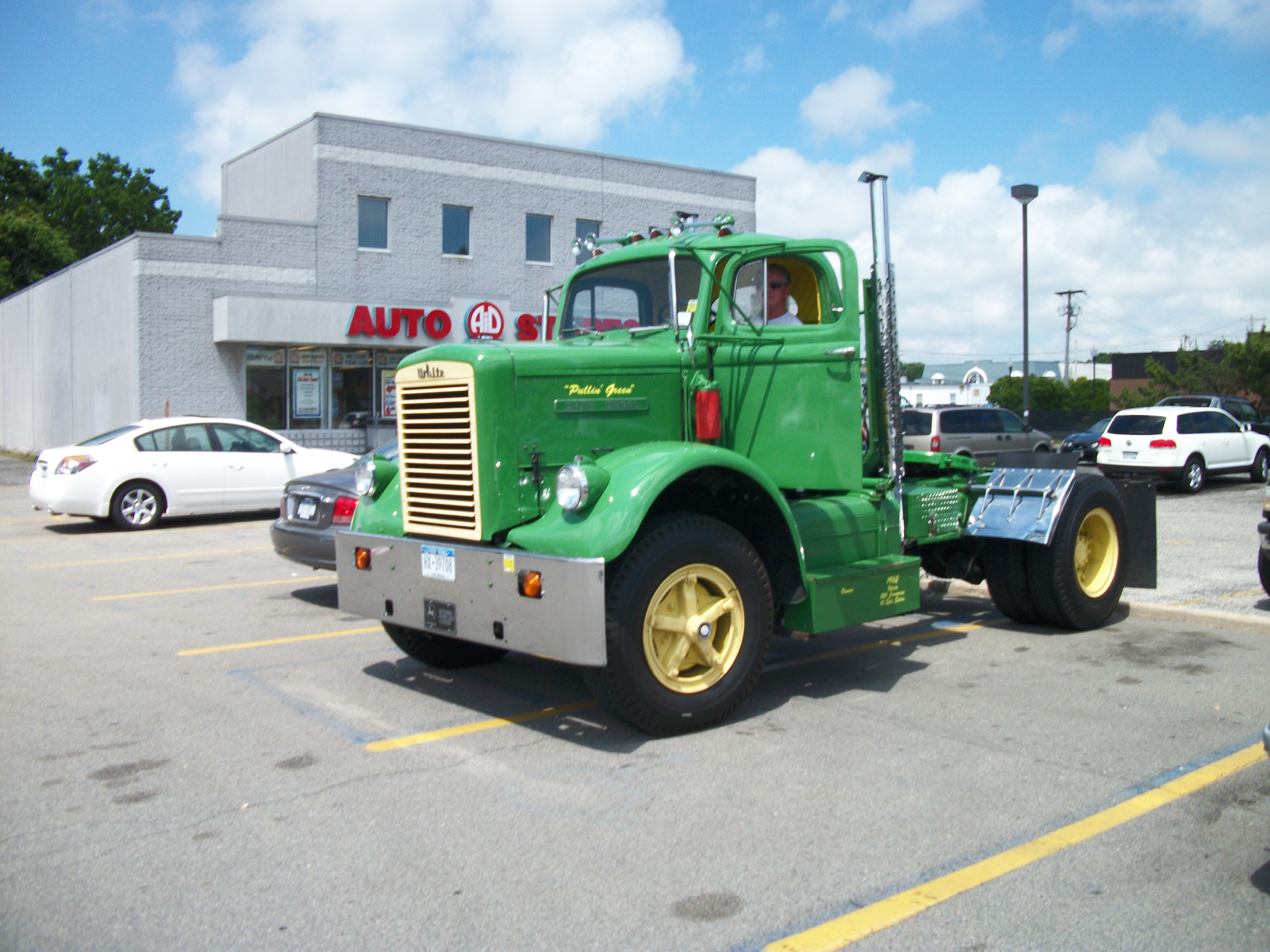
1962 tractor

In 1953, White purchased Pittsburgh, Pennsylvania-based Autocar Company. From 1951 until 1977, White also distributed Freightliner Trucks. This took place under an agreement with Freightliner's parent, Consolidated Freightways. White manufactured trucks under its own brands—White, Autocar, and Western Star—as well, leading to the company becoming known as the "Big Four" through to the mid-1970s. The Sterling nameplate, unused by White as long as the company owned it, went to Freightliner after the companies' split. It was then used by Daimler Trucks, who manufactured the former Ford heavy truck line under the Sterling name, from 1997 to 2008.

Sales dropped during the 1960s, and White tried merging with White Consolidated Industries, the original company that once made sewing machines, however the federal government blocked this deal. The company opened plants in Virginia and Utah, since they did not have unions, but this did not help. Semon Knudsen, former president of Ford, made the company successful for a time, but the decline continued. Later, the federal government approved a merger with White Consolidated, which feared being hurt by White's troubles. Mergers with Daimler and Renault were also considered. Production was somewhat limited as White did not have a lighter range (13,330 units built in 1978), leading to several attempts at linking up with various European manufacturers.

By 1980, White was insolvent, filing Chapter 11 bankruptcy case 80-13361 in the Northern District of Ohio on September 4 of that year. Volvo acquired most of the assets of the company in 1981, while two energy-related companies based in Calgary, Alberta, Bow Valley Resource Services, and NovaCorp, an Alberta corporation, purchased the Canadian assets, including the Kelowna, British Columbia plant, and the Western Star nameplate and product range.

In 1983, White emerged from bankruptcy reorganization under the name of Northeast Ohio Axle Inc. (which would later be changed to Neoax in May 1986). In March 1987, Neoax bought the Fairfield Manufacturing Company (a maker of custom gears), and in March 1988, it acquired IU International Corporation (a Philadelphia-based conglomerate) through a hostile takeover. After acquiring IU International, Neoax sold the conglomerate's trucking and food distribution units, only keeping the waste management division. In 1989, Neoax changed its name to EnviroSource, and in 1998, to Envirosource.

=== Aftermath ===
Volvo created the Volvo White Truck Corporation which continued making White trucks.

In 1988, Volvo created a new brand called WhiteGMC, which was the result of a merger with General Motors. The WhiteGMC brand would last until 1996. Following the discontinuation of the brand, Volvo would continue making trucks under Volvo and Autocar nameplates.

In 1991, AGCO bought White Farm Equipment from TIC.

In 2001, White Farm Equipment would stop making tractors and only make planters.

In 2021, White Farm Equipment was discontinued by AGCO which would end the White brand entirely.

== Products ==
- 15 B (1928-1930) 1t
- 20 A
- 50A bus
- 52 (1926-1928) 5t
- 52 T 3½t
- 51 A (1928-1933) 2½t
- 54 (1928-1930)
- 55 3½t
- 56 2t
- 57 1¼t
- 99 White Horse (1939–1940)
- 99A White Horse (1941-1942)
- 116 White Horse (1939-1940)
- 116A White Horse (1941-1942)
- 444 T
- 600
- 666
- 700
- 701 (1934-1935)
- 704 (1936-1937)
- 706
- 706 National Park bus
- 707
- 784
- 798
- 800
- 805
- 810
- 820
- 920
- 1064
- 1100
- 1144
- 1500
- 1550
- 3000 Series (1949-1960s)
- 3015
- 3020
- 3022
- 3028
- 3400
- 4000
- 4200
- 4264
- 4400
- 4464
- 5000
- 5400
- 6000
- 7000
- 9000
- 9062
- 9064
- Autocar Company
- Construcktor
- Freightliner Trucks
- M2
- M3
- M3 Scout Car
- M13
- M16
- Oliver Farm Equipment
- Orion Bus
- PDQ Delivery (1960–1966)
- Road Boss 1 and 2
- Road Xpeditor 1 and 2 (WX)
- TBC Truck
- WC
- Western Star Trucks
- Road Boss 1 and 2
- Road Commander 1 and 2
- WIA64T
- WX42 pumper/rescue

== Overview of production figures ==
Year	Production	Model	Serial Numbers
1900	18	Model A	
1901	193	Model A	1-193
1902	578	Model B	194-578
1903	502	Model C	579-1080
1904	710	Model D; Model E	1081-1790
1905	1,015	Model E	1791-2905
1906	1,534	Model F	2906-4339
1907	1,130	Model G; Model H	4340-5442 (G), 4349-5469 (H)
1908	1,068	Model K; Model L	5470-6537 (K), 5471-6538 (L)
1909	1,374	Model O; Model M	6539-7905 (M),
1910	1,248	Steam: Model OO; Model MM; Gasoline: Model G-A; Model G-B	
1911	1,900	The last steam car was built in January 1911; Gasoline: Model G-A; Model G-B	
1912	1,434	Model Sixty	
1913	1,263	Model Sixty	
1914	1,167	Model Sixty	
1915	1,058	Model 30; Model 45; Model 60	
1916	801	Model 30; Model 45	
1917	724	Model 16 Valve "4"	
1918	518	Model 16 Valve "4"	
1919	18	Model 16 Valve "4"	
1920	0	Model 16 Valve "4"	
1921	2	Model 16 Valve "4"	
Sum	18,062		

== Overview of production White Trucks ==
Year	Production	Model
1911	251	GTA, GBE, GTB
1912	1,051	TC, TCB
1913	1,679	TC, TCB
1914	1,901	TCB, TCD, GBBE, TBC, TAD
1915	2,543	TCD, GBBE, TBC, TAD
1916	7,206	TCD, GBBE, TBC, TAD
1917	5,425	TCD, GBBE, TBC, TAD
1918	6,490	TCD, GBBE, TBC, TAD
1919	9,742	GBBE, TBC, TAD
1920	12,150	TBC
1921	15,355	15, 15-45, 20, 20-45, 20 D, 40, 40 D, 45 D
1922	5,015	15, 15-45, 20, 20-45, 20 D, ⟨50⟩, 40, 40 D, 45
1923	7,167	15, 15-45, 20, 20-45, 20 D, ⟨50⟩, 40 D, 45, 45 D
1924	11,690	15, 15-45, 20, 20-45, 20 D, 40, 40 D, 45, 45 D, 51, ⟨50 A⟩
Sum	88,664	

Model in angle bracket = ⟨bus⟩

Year	Production	Model
1925		15, 15-45, 20, 20-45, 20 D, 40, 40 D, 45, 45 D, 51, ⟨50 A⟩
1926		15, 15-45, 20, 20-45, 20 D, 40, 40 D, 45, 45 D, 51, ⟨53⟩
1927		15 B, 57, 20 A, 56, 51 A, 58, 55, 52, 52 T, ⟨53⟩, ⟨50 B⟩, ⟨54⟩
1928		15 B, 57, 20 A, 56, 51 A, 58, 55, 52, 52 T, ⟨53⟩, ⟨50 B⟩, ⟨54⟩
1929		⟨54⟩
1930		⟨54⟩, 64
1931		
1932		
1948	13,056	
1949	9,575	
1950	15,752	
1951	18,345	
1952	13,329	
1953	15,291	
1954	12,737	
1955	16,783	
1956	17,359	
1957	17,173	
1958	17,403	
1959	19,976	

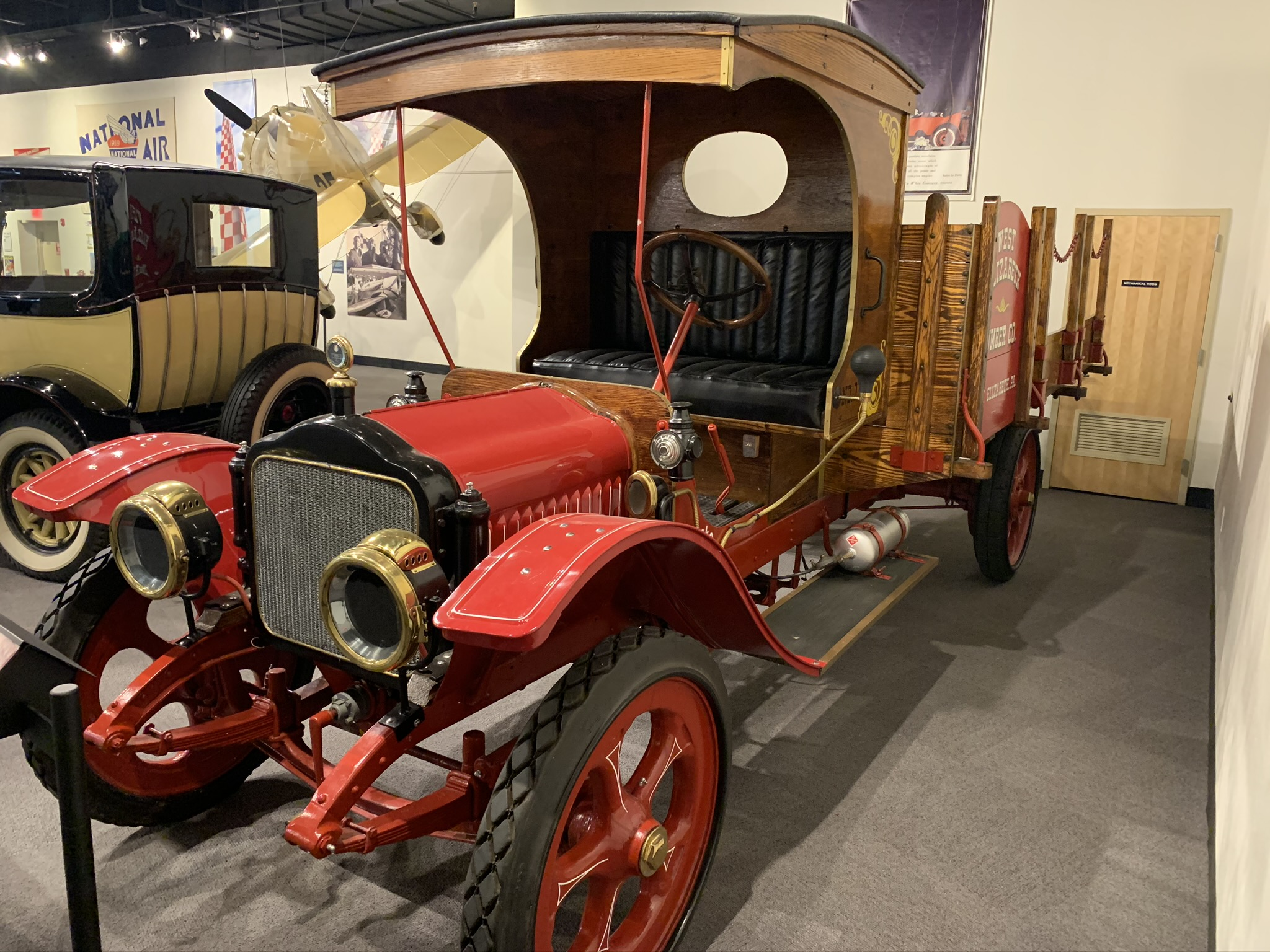
1909 White Truck at Crawford Auto-Aviation Museum

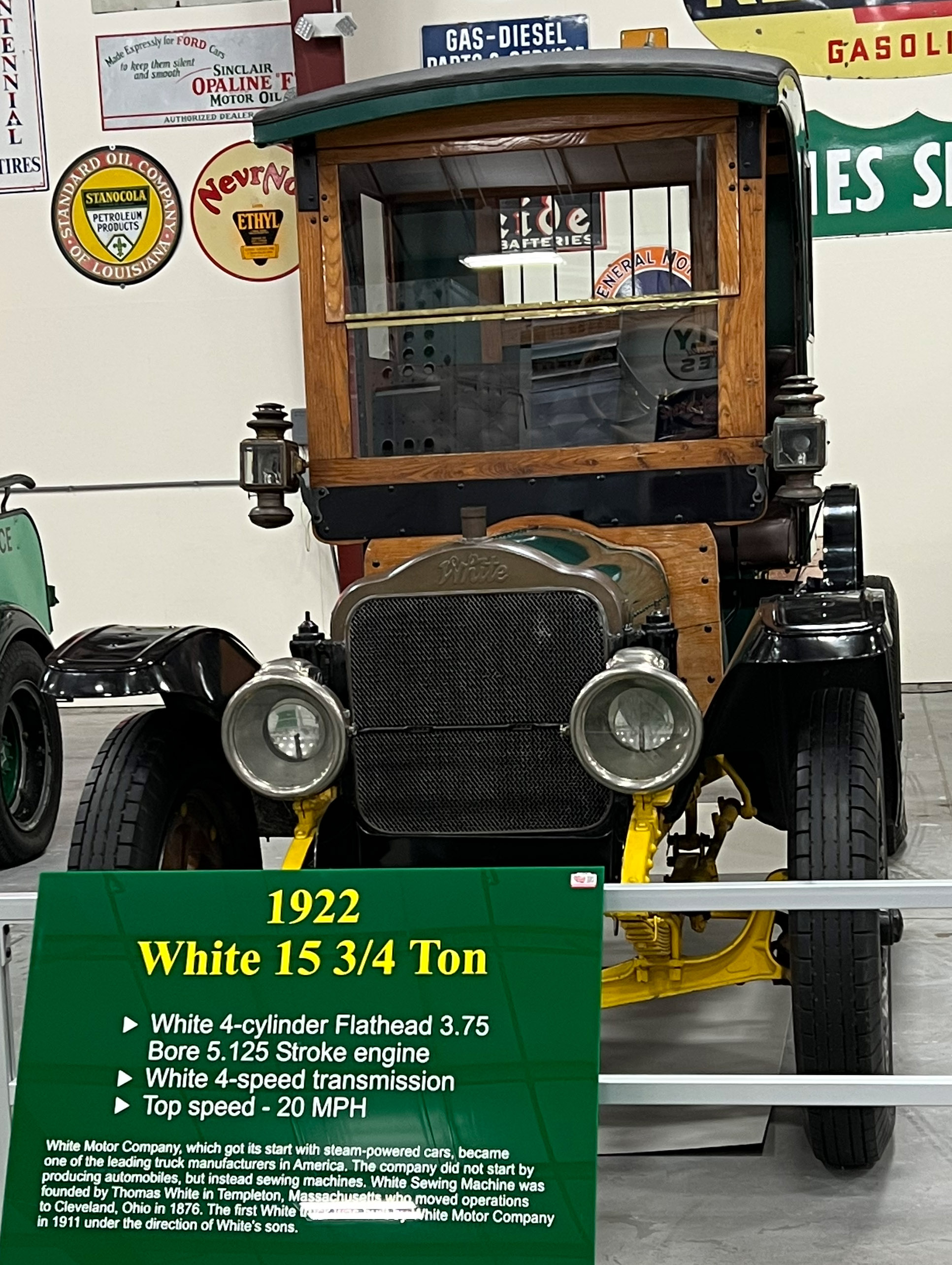
1922 White Model 15 truck on display at the Iowa 80 Trucking Museum, Walcott, Iowa.

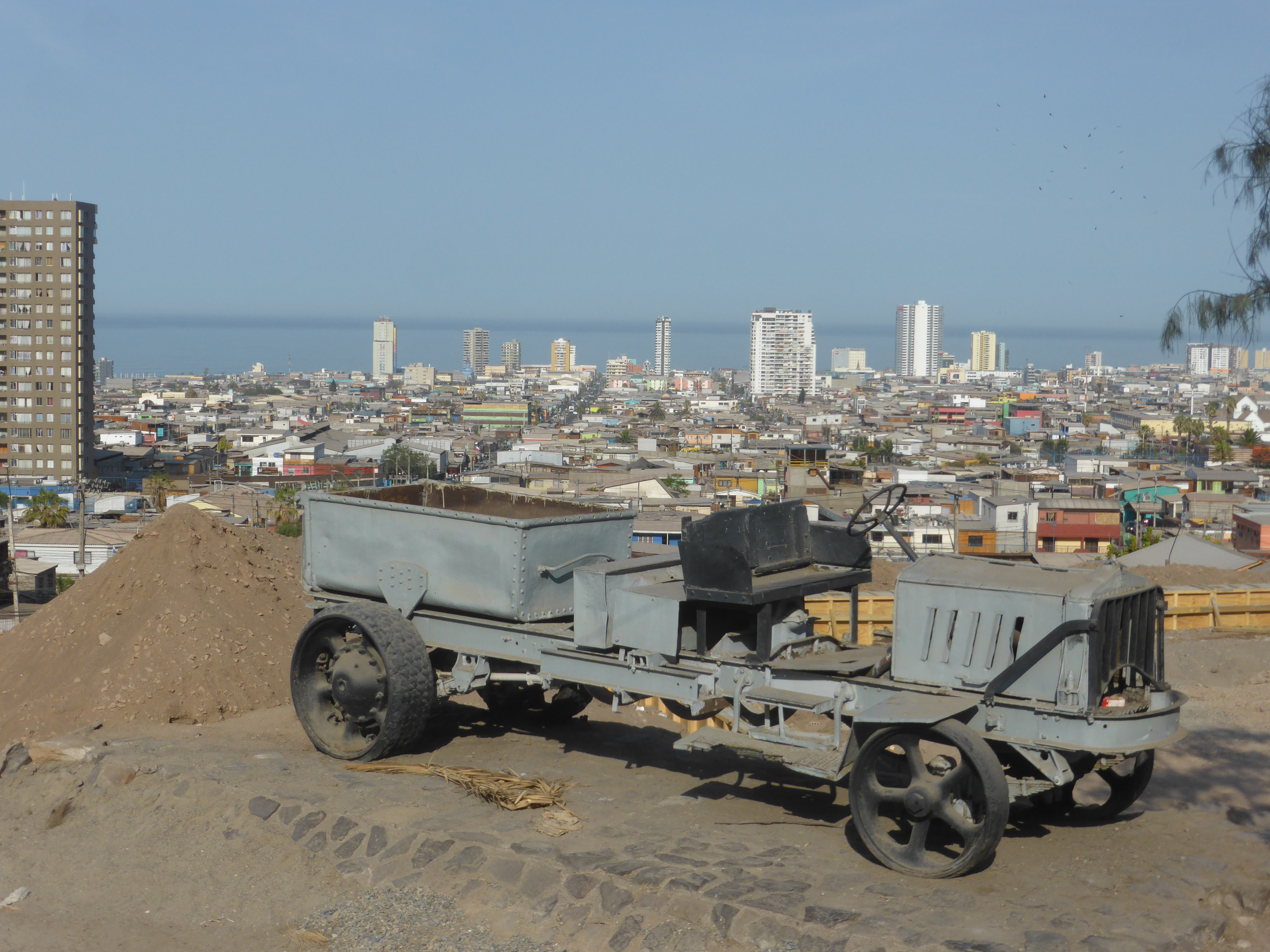
White truck in Iquique, Chile

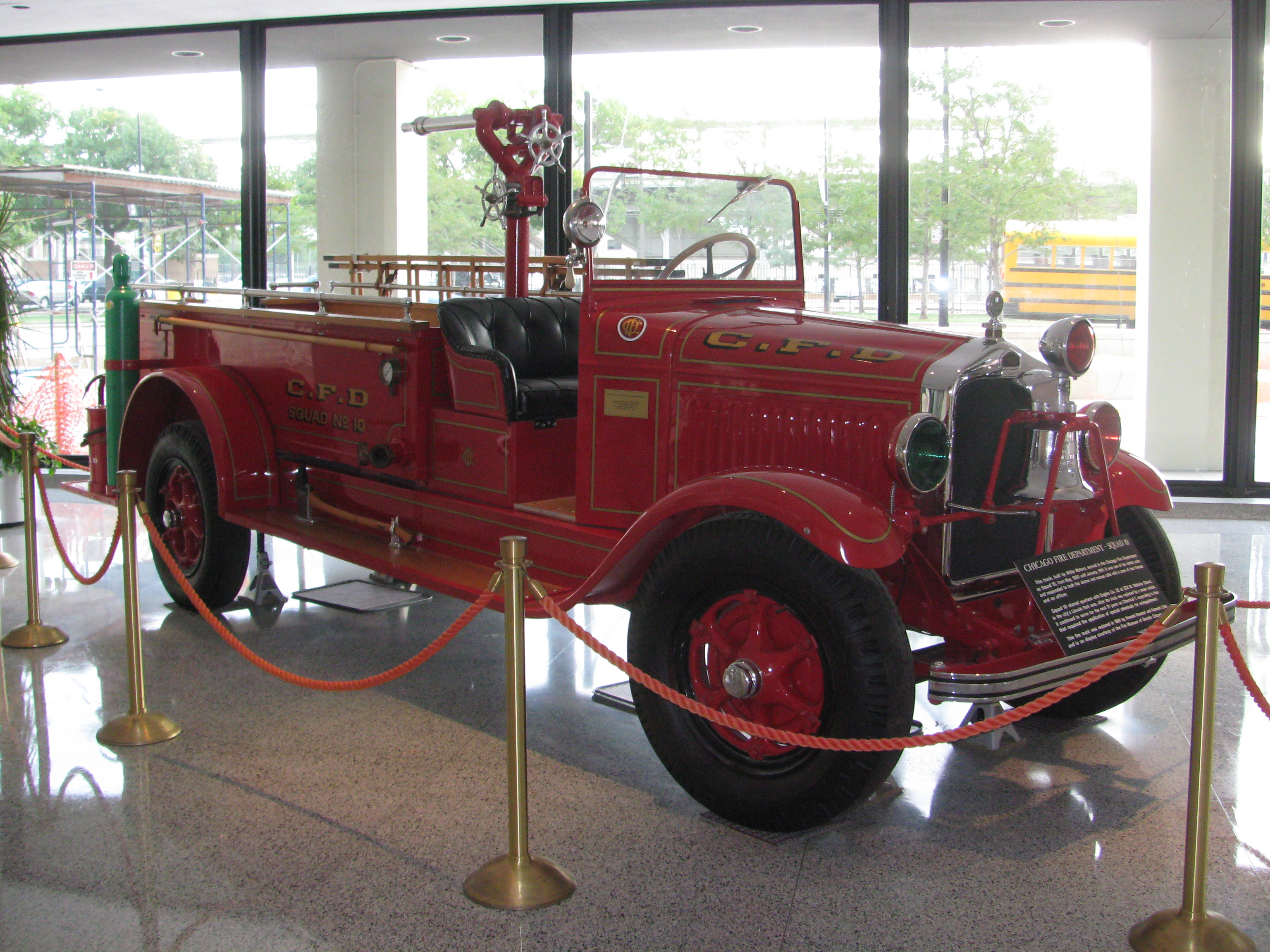
White truck in the Chicago Fire Department from 1930 to 1941

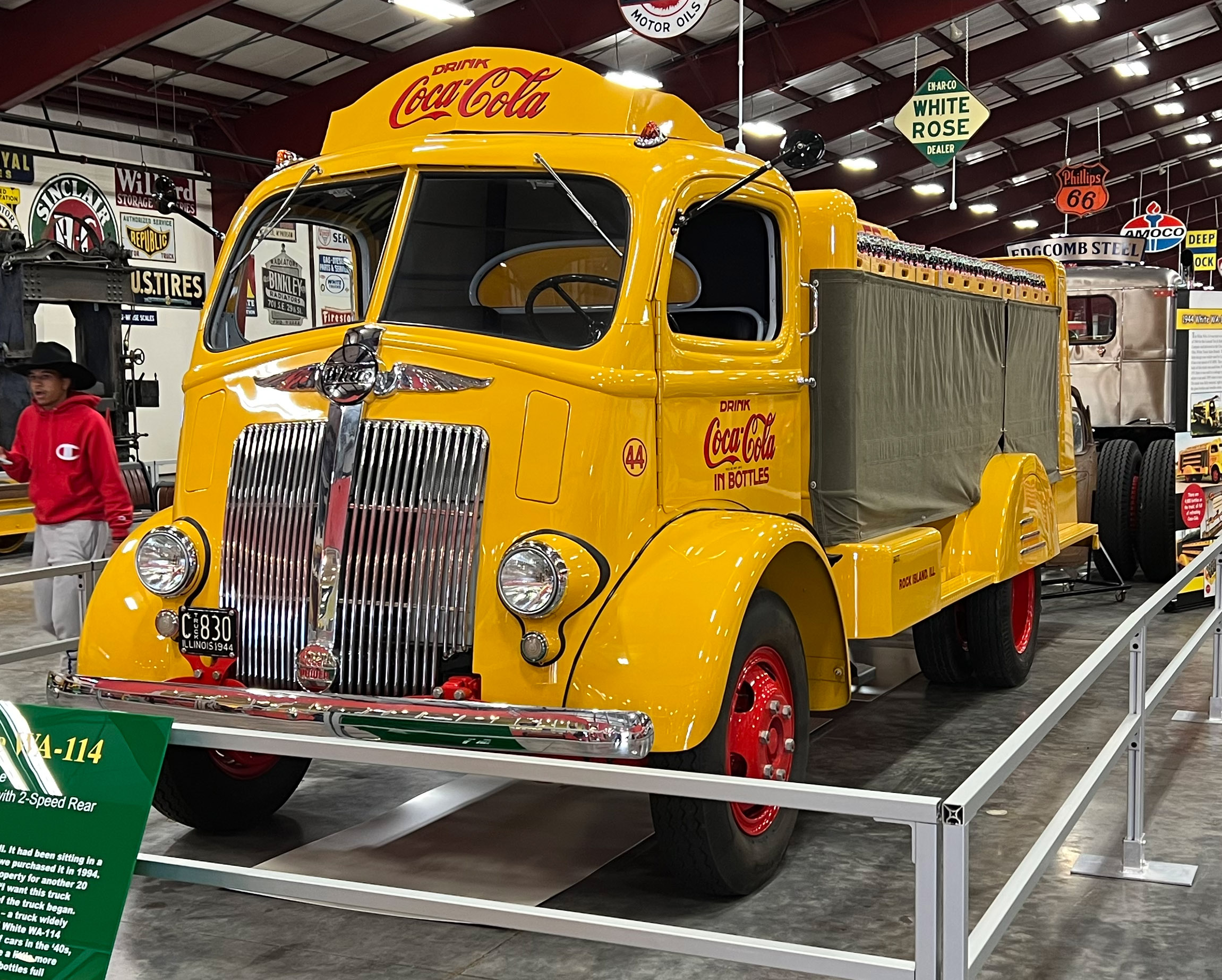
1944 White Model VA-114 truck on display at the Iowa 80 Trucking Museum, Walcott, Iowa.

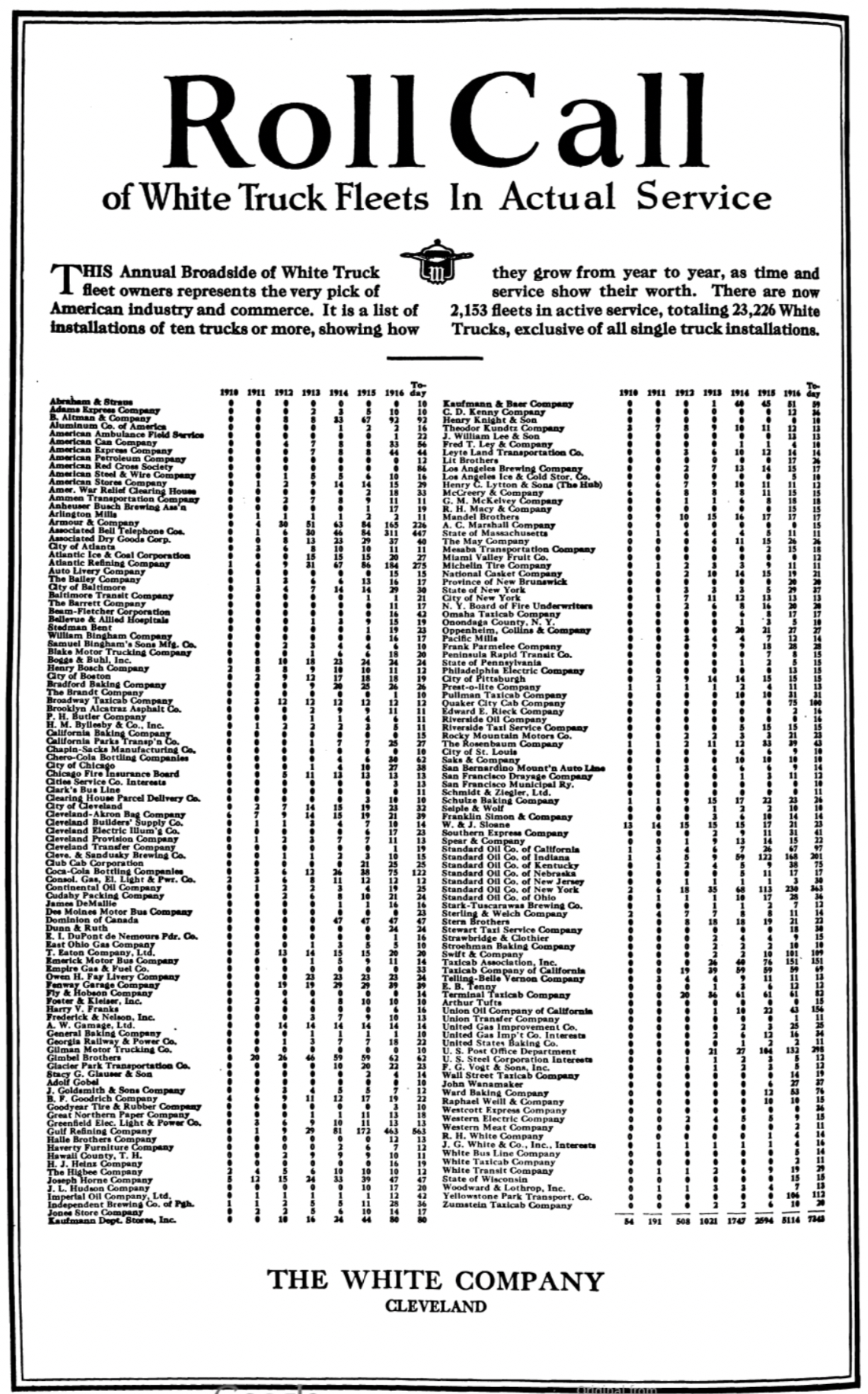
White trucks 1917 more than 23226 produced

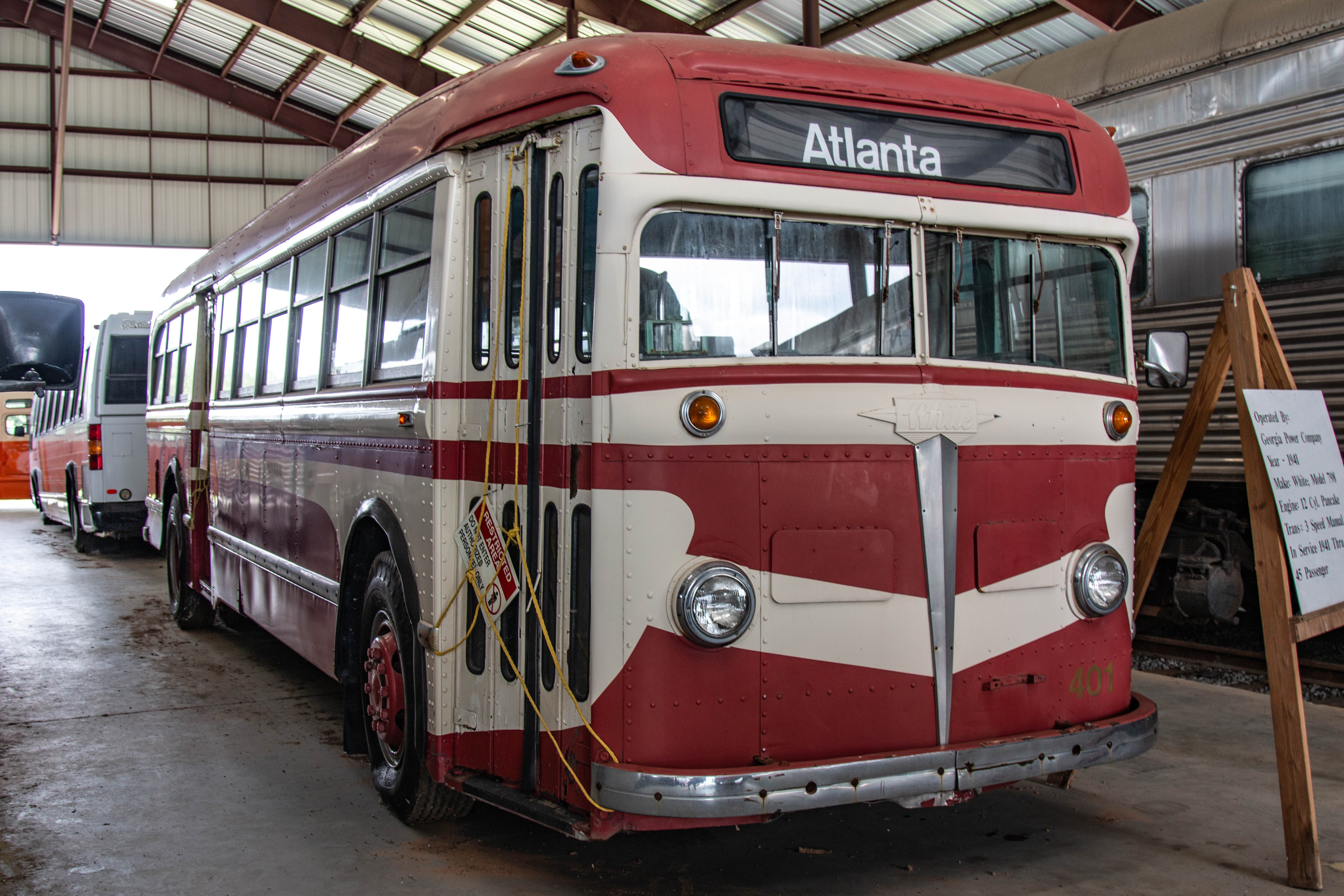
A 1941 White model 798 bus at the Southeastern Railway Museum in 2022

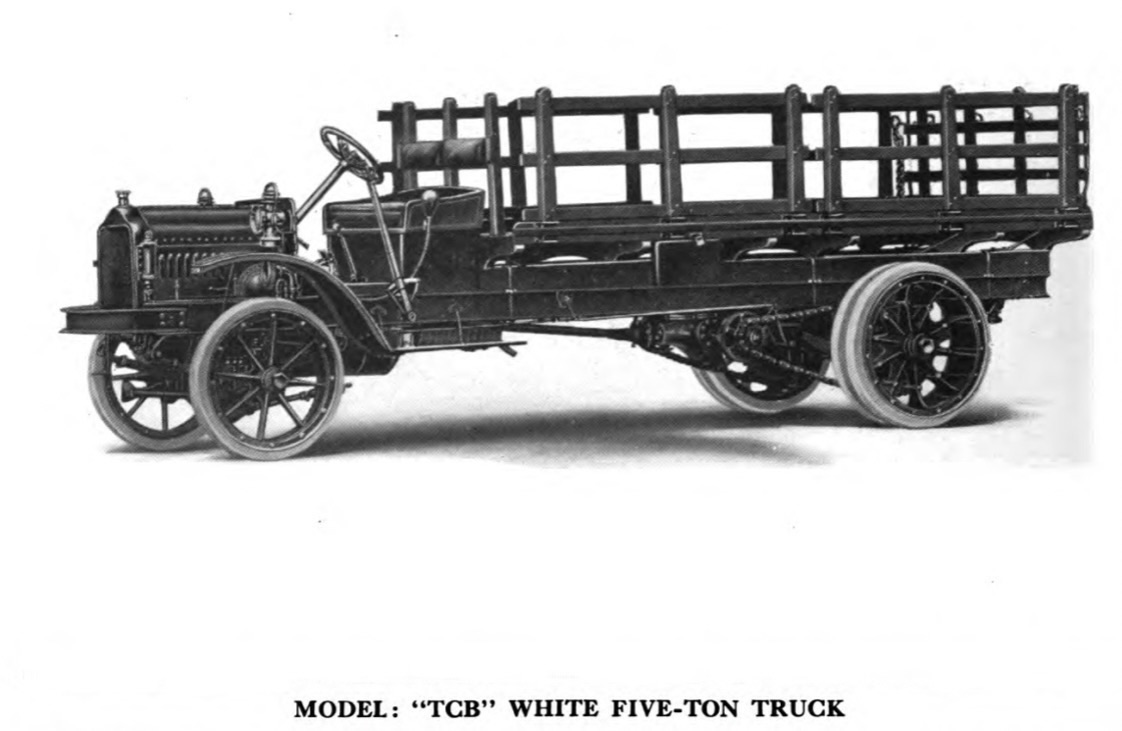
White Model TCB (1912-1914)

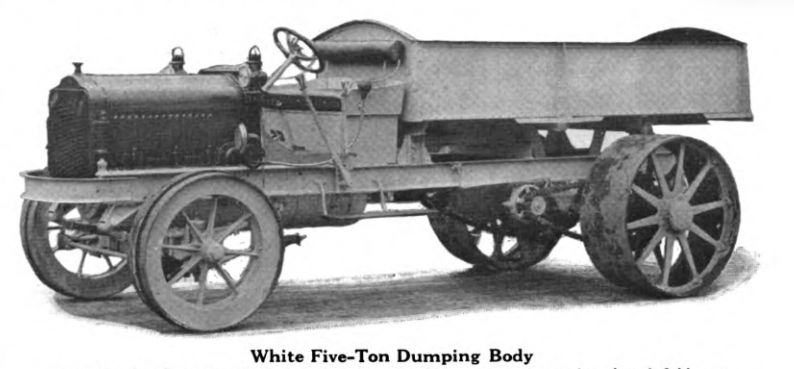
White TCD ATC (1914-1918) 5t

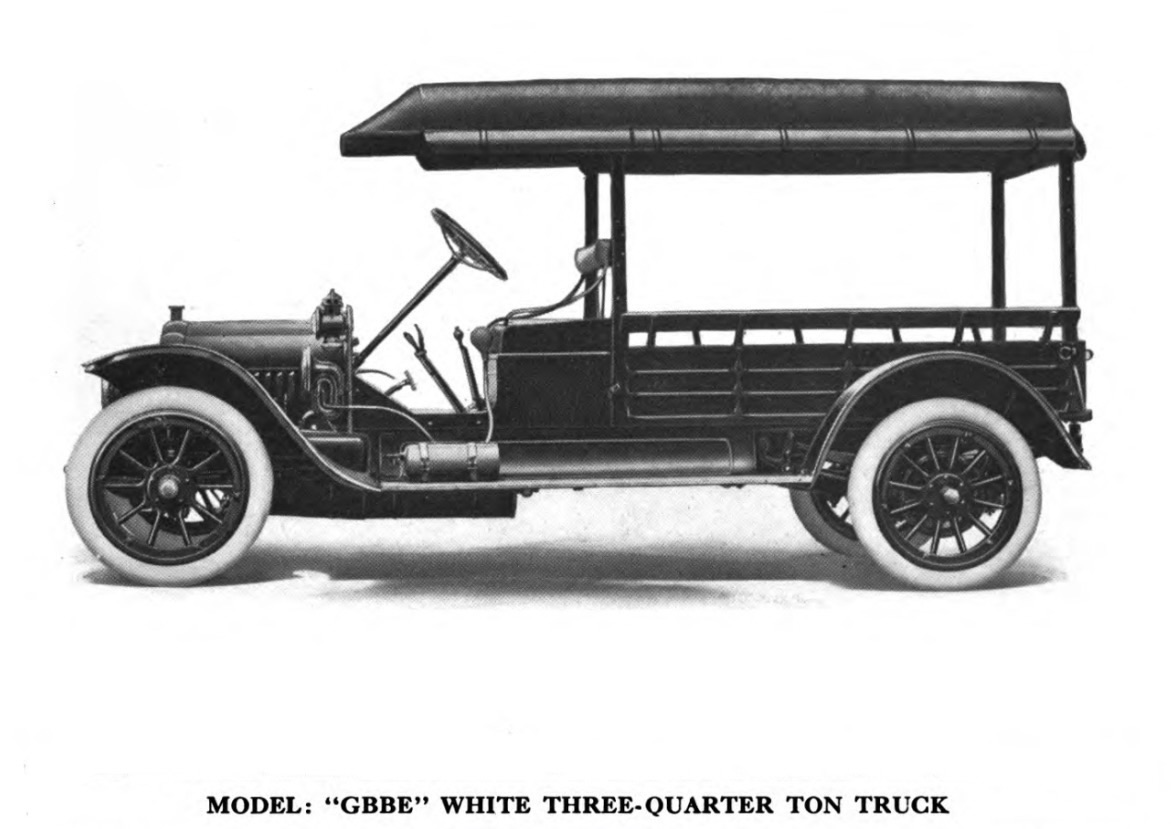
White Model GBBE (1914-1919)

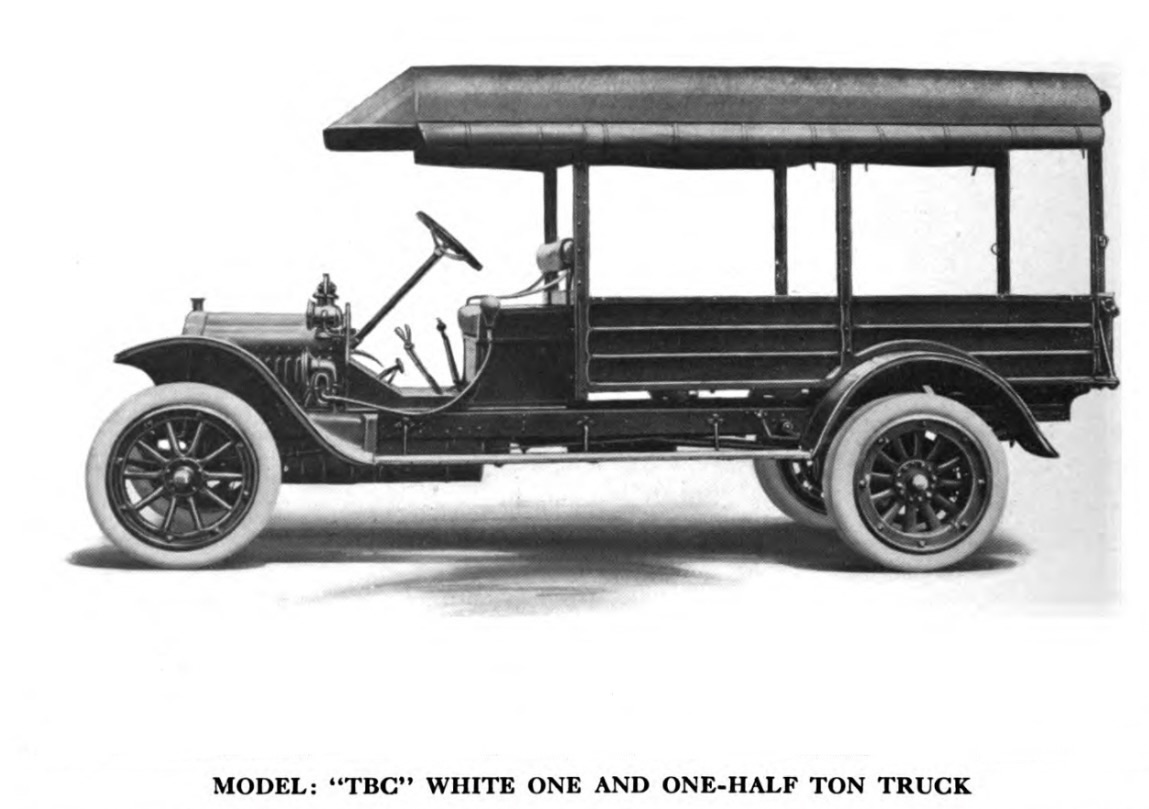
White Model TBC (1914-1920)

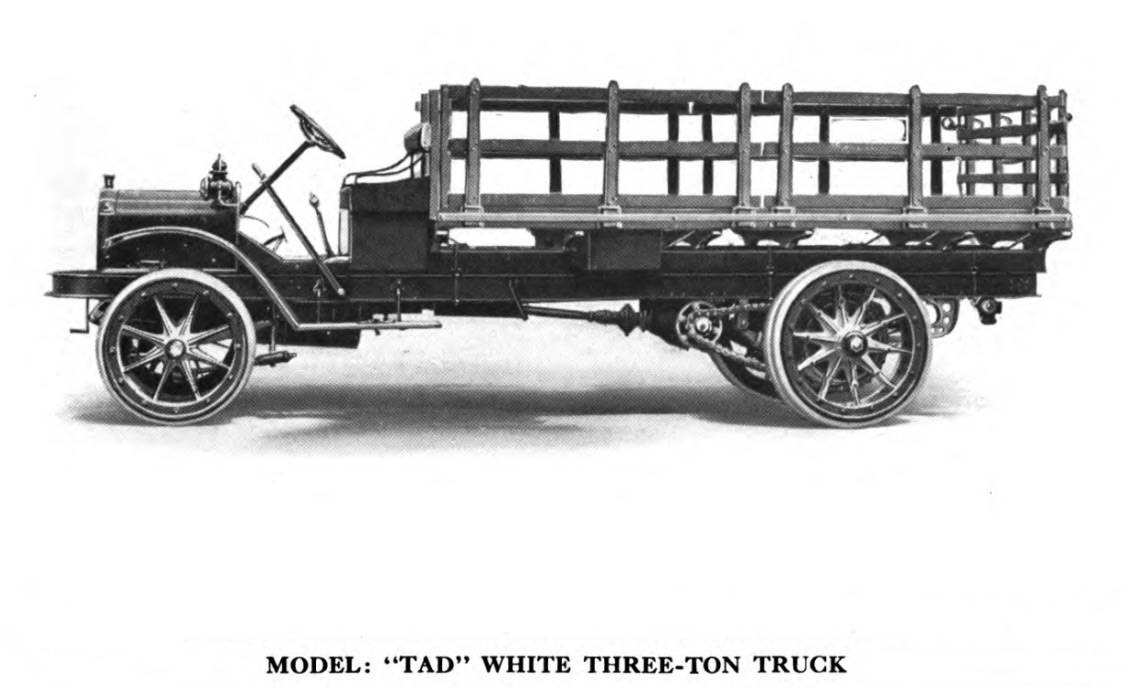
White Model TAD (1914-1919)

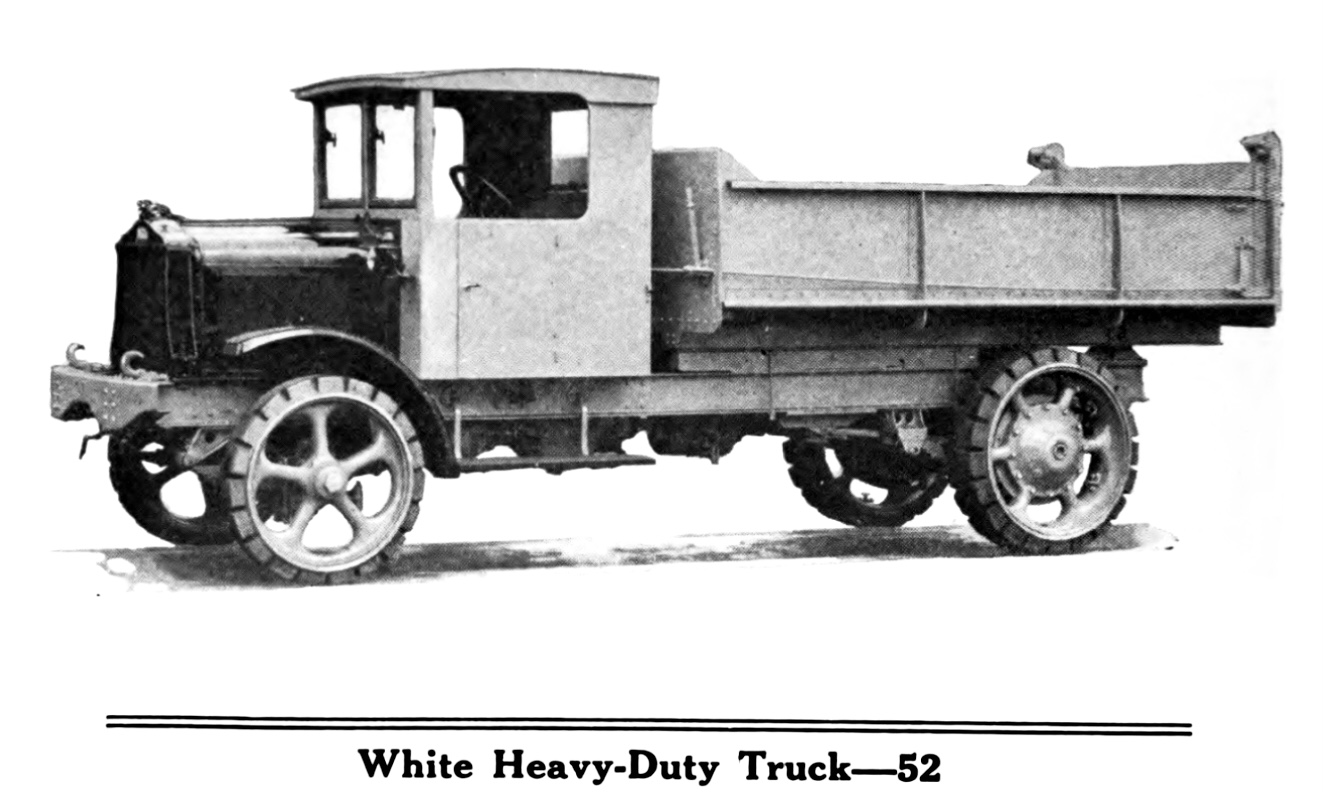
White 52 (1926-1928)

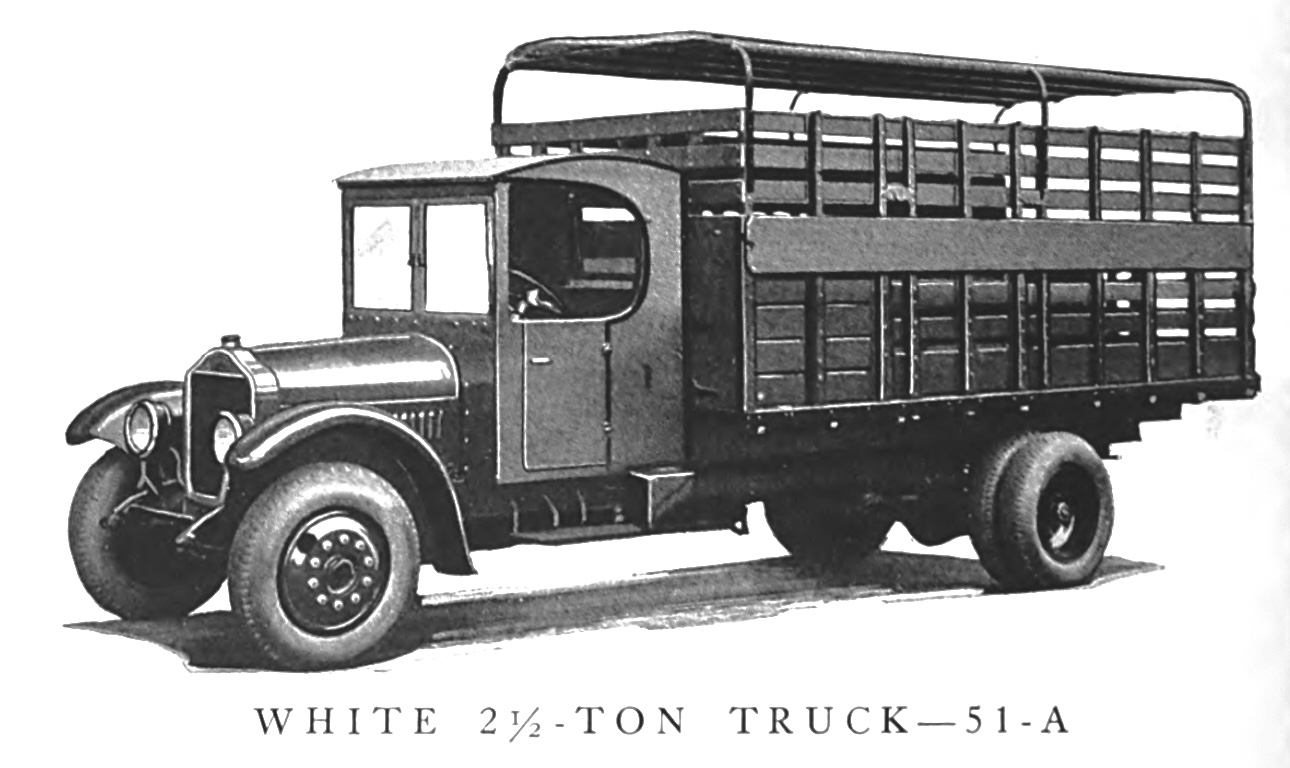
White 51 A (1928-1933)

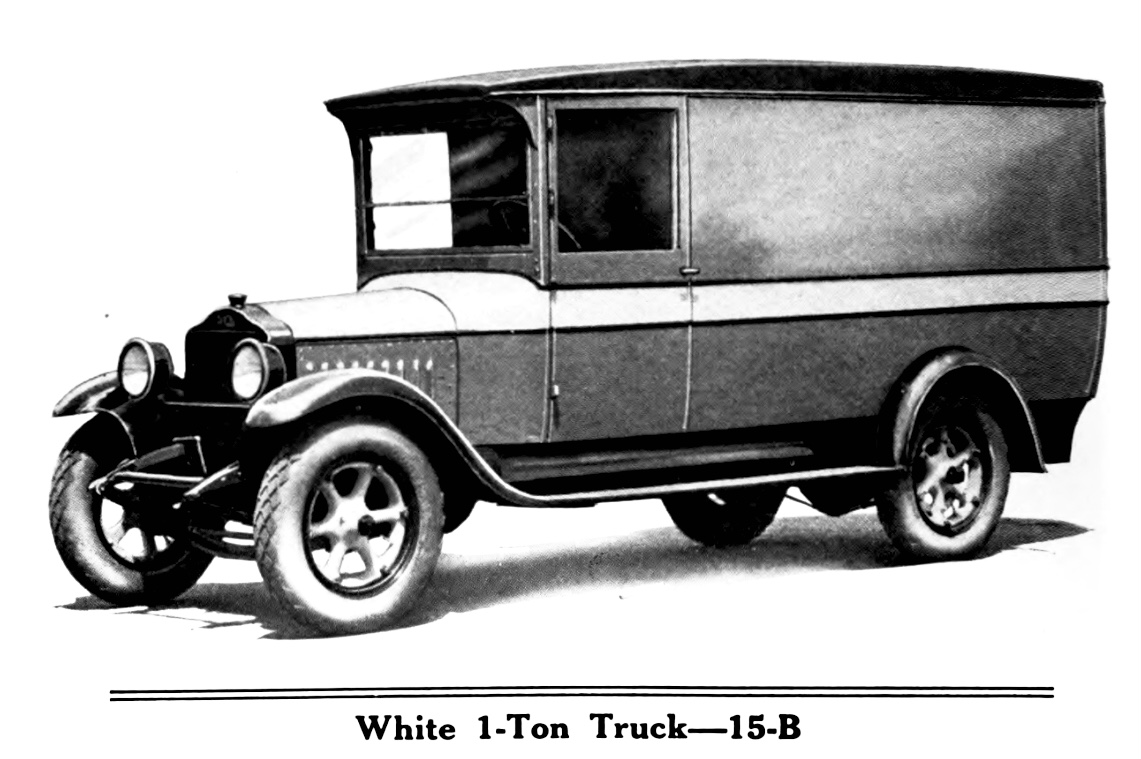
White 15 B (1928-1930)

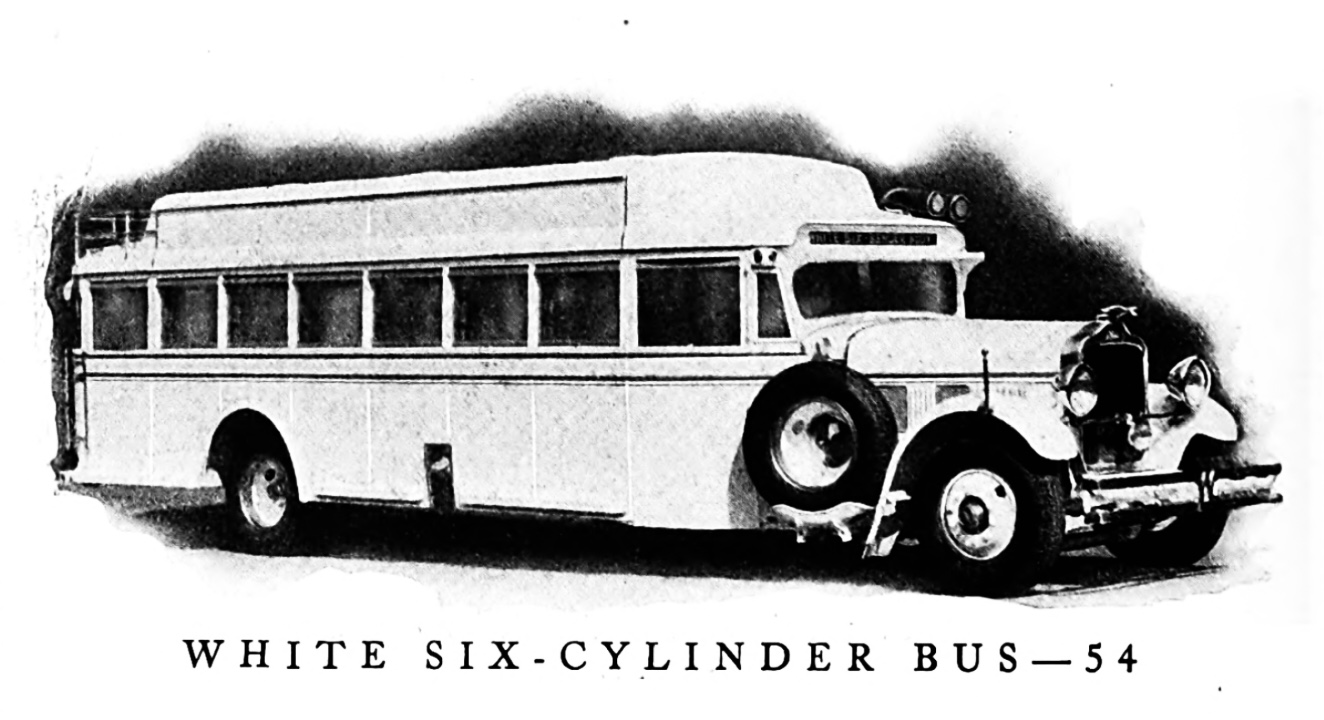
White 54 (1928-1930)

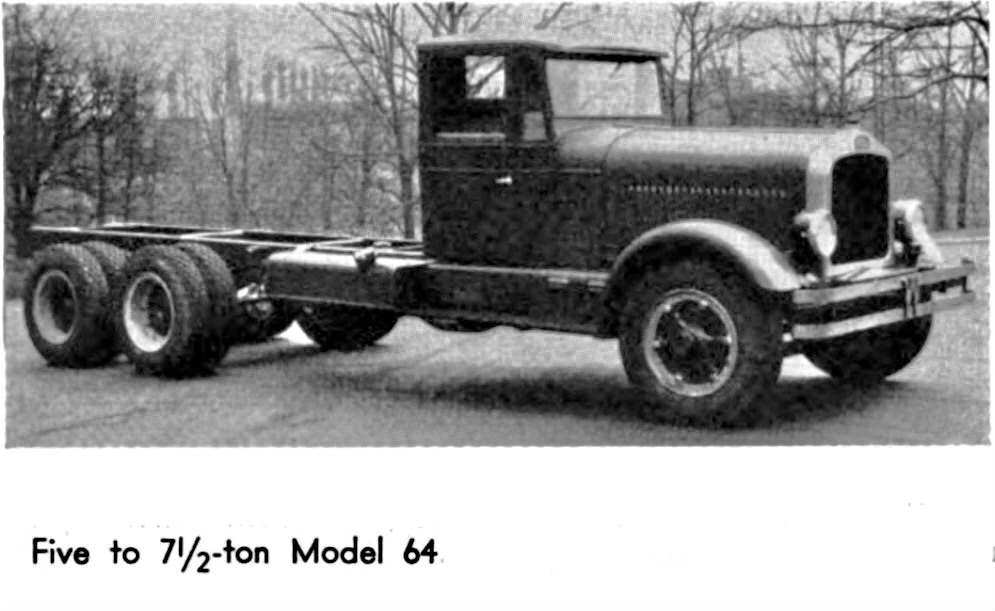
White Model 64 SW 3 (1930)

Caution Plate White Truck

== See also ==
- Oliver Heritage Magazine
- White armored car
- White Farm Equipment
- White Sewing Machine Company
- White-Westinghouse
