= Lori Healey =

American administrator and urban planner (1959–2025)

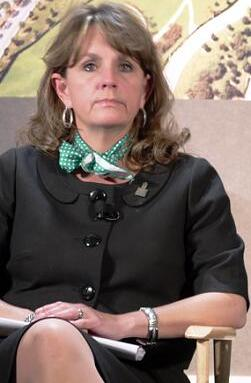
- Healey in 2009
- Born: 1959; New Orleans, Louisiana, U.S.
- Died: May 3, 2025 (aged 65)
- Education: Kansas State University (B.A., M.Sc.)
- Occupation: Urban planner
- Years active: 1983–2025
- Employer: Obama Foundation (2020–2025)
- Partner: Walt Eckenhoff
- Children: 2

Lori Thomas Healey (1959 – May 3, 2025) was an American urban planner who served as Chicago mayor Richard M. Daley's chief of staff, chief executive officer of the Metropolitan Pier and Exposition Authority and who also managed the construction and operations of the Obama Presidential Center in Chicago. Hired by the Obama Foundation, she began in this role December 1, 2020. She also oversaw the development of Wintrust Arena and the Marriott Marquis Chicago.

== Biography ==
Prior to joining the Obama Foundation, Healey served as president of a new Chicago regional business unit for Clayco, a real estate development, architecture, engineering and construction firm. Healey would run the 2016 Chicago Olympic bid committee and would organize the 2012 NATO summit, which was held in Chicago, and 2012 G-8 summit.

Formerly, Healey served as the chief executive officer of the Metropolitan Pier and Exposition Authority, owner of McCormick Place, the USA's largest convention center and Navy Pier, Illinois top-visited tourist destination and the 1,258 Hyatt Regency McCormick Place. The Authority's activities generate approximately $10 billion annually into the economy and supports 66,000 jobs. In her role as CEO, Healey oversaw the development of the McCormick Collection which includes a 10,000 seat event center, which became known as Wintrust Arena, and a 1,206 room Marriott Marquis Headquarters Hotel. Both opened in 2017.

Prior to joining the MPEA, Healey served as the chief executive officer of Tur Partners LLC, a firm founded by Chicago's former mayor Richard M. Daley. Healey also served as Principal in Charge of the Development Group for the John Buck Company, focused on growing the firm's private real estate and infrastructure related transactions. She coordinated the organizational and planning activities for the NATO Summit in Chicago in 2012, acting as Director of the NATO Host Committee as an executive "on loan," overseeing planning, fundraising and implementation of the Summit in an 8-month time frame. Healey built a strong public sector career during which she earned a reputation for bringing together private and public leaders. In 2009, Healey was appointed President of Chicago for 2016, where she was responsible for locally leading Chicago's bid for the 2016 Summer Olympics.

Healey held several senior positions for the City of Chicago under the administration of mayor Richard M. Daley, most recently as Daley's Chief of Staff. She earlier served as Commissioner of the city's Department of Planning and Development, overseeing more than $1 billion of combined investment into the city's economic development programs and projects. Healey's previous experiences include time as a principal at Perkins + Will, and as deputy director for Business Development of the (then) Illinois Department of Commerce & Community Affairs. Healey began her career as a policy aide to former Kansas Governor John Carlin in 1983.

Healey's civic involvement includes being a board member for Local Initiatives Support Chicago (LISC), World Business Chicago, Chicago Architecture Foundation, Loyola University Health System, Chicago Police Memorial Foundation, City Club of Chicago, Chicago Fire Department Foundation, as well as being an Ex-Officio Board Member for Navy Pier, Inc., and Choose Chicago. Healey's civic involvement also includes the Economic Club of Chicago, The Commercial Club of Chicago and the Chicago Network.

=== Personal life and death ===
Healey was born in New Orleans. She had a Master of Science in Public Administration and a Bachelor of Arts in economics from Kansas State University. Crain's Chicago Business featured Healey in its "Forty Under Forty" publication in 1999 and as a "Woman to Watch" in 2009.

Healey dated Walt Eckenhoff and had two children. She died of pancreatic cancer on May 3, 2025, at the age of 65.
