= Rick Siegel =

American personal manager

- Born: c. 1960s United States
- Occupations: Comedian, personal manager, entrepreneur
- Known for: Court case in the California Supreme Court (Case S288947: Pardoe v. Salazar) pushes to reshape the enforcement of the TTA
- Spouse: Jennie Nigrosh

Rick Siegel is an American personal manager who is best known for his legal efforts that made the California Labor Commission change their interpretation of how the California Talent Agencies Act ("TAA") is enforced. On January 7, 2026, the United States Supreme Court officially docketed Siegel v. Salazar, Docket No. 25-798, where the Court is asked to recognize the Labor Commissioner's enforcement of the Act is unconstitutional.

Siegel created LaughTrack in 1989, a national magazine about stand-up comedy, and later became a personal manager for comic performers, actors and writers. In 2008, he created several environmentally-friendly products focused on the dry cleaning industry.

He was chosen for induction to the National Conference of Personal Managers Hall Of Fame's class of 2017.

== Career ==
As a personal manager, his clients included Leah Remini, Rondell Sheridan (That's So Raven, Cory In The House); Ian Gomez (The Drew Carey Show, Felicity, The Norm Show);Reggie Hayes (Girlfriends), Rosa Blasi (Strong Medicine).

He also convinced Craig Ferguson to immigrate to America and represented the Scotsman for over a decade, and he managed Nia Vardalos. Siegel produced her play My Big Fat Greek Wedding, and subsequently helped develop and cause the film My Big Fat Greek Wedding to be produced.

In a case brought by Marathon Entertainment (Siegel's management firm) after he sued Rosa Blasi for unpaid commissions and she then petitioned the Labor Commissioner, asking for relief from her contractual obligations based on his alleged actions as a talent agent without the requisite license, the California Supreme Court found that the Labor Commission had wrongly not been incorporating severance when adjudicating Talent Agencies Act controversies.

Siegel has written multiple articles related to the TAA that have been published by the Los Angeles Daily Journal, the regional trade paper for the legal field, including one the newspaper titled, "A Generation of Incorrect Talent Agencies Act Rulings" where Siegel showed how the current interpretation conflicts with four California Supreme court holdings.

Rick Siegel founded and edited LaughTrack magazine, which had a 550,000 circulation and was handed to patrons at every major comedy club in the country, similar in manner to how Playbill is distributed to audiences at Broadway Shows. Under Siegel's direction, LaughTrack was the first national publication to write about comedians Tim Allen, Larry David, Drew Carey, Ellen DeGeneres, Jonathan Katz, and Bill Hicks.

LaughTrack debuted in March 1989 and that first issue showcased five new comedians (at that time) in its "Breaking Through" column. That list included five-time Emmy winner Kevin Rooney, Bill Hicks, Jonathan Katz (Dr. Katz, Private Therapist on Comedy Central), Drew Carey and Larry David.

In 2008 Siegel and his wife, Jennie Nigrosh, invented a reusable dry cleaning garment bag and began to market the bag under the banner of The Green Garmento.

In 2009, The International Housewares Show honored The Green Garmento with its DESIGN DEFINED 2009 designation and the International Hotel, Motel and Restaurant Show nominated The Green Garmento for one of its Editors' Choice Awards. In 2011, Entrepreneur Magazine called The Green Garmento, "One of the 100 Genius Companies To Watch." Siegel and Nigrosh are also co-inventors of the Gargantote (US Patent No. 3369584), a reusable flat-bottomed laundry bag, and the Hawk Hanger, (US Patent No. 9,414,703), a clothes hanger that lowers the carbon footprint, production, shipping and storage costs.

Siegel penned a column about business, "The High Road," which first was carried by American Drycleaner and later by Cleaner and Laundry, two trade publications for the dry cleaning and laundry industries. He has also written several columns published by The Huffington Post about the 2008 Presidential Election.
