= The Green Garmento =

Reusable packaging product

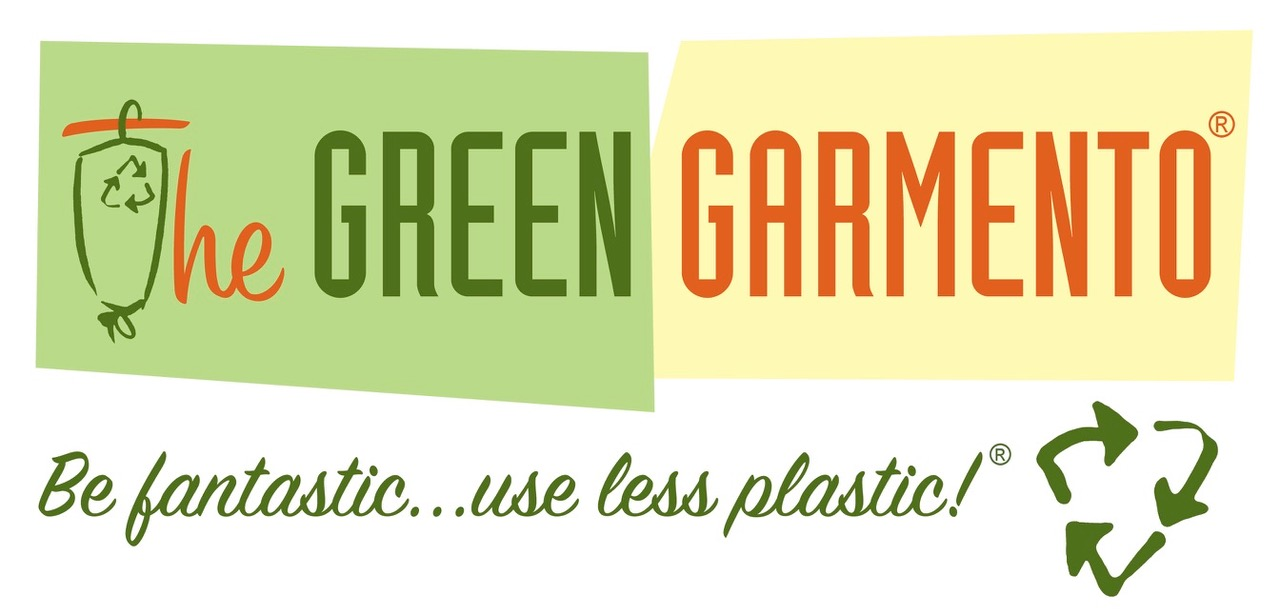

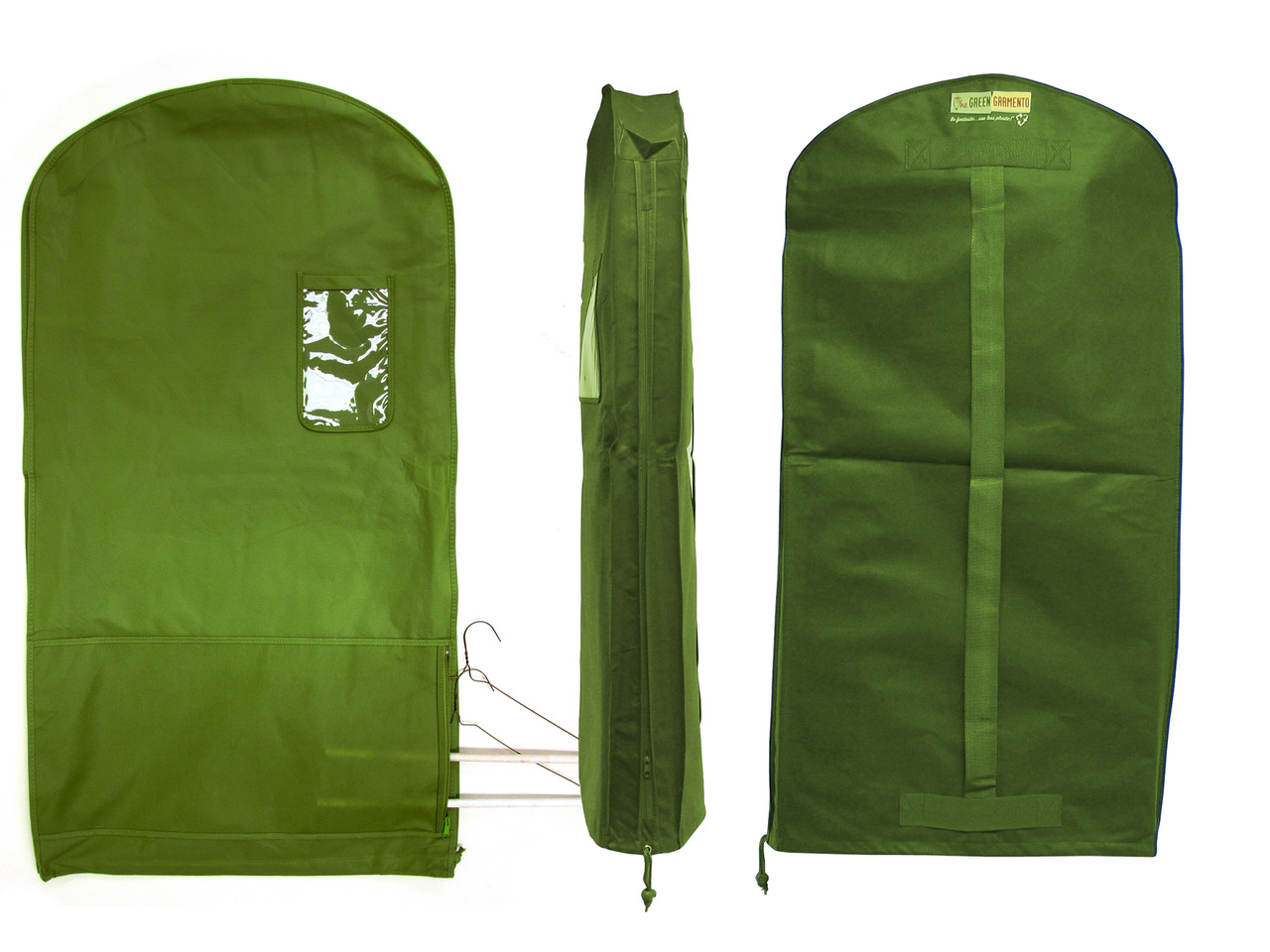
- The Green Garmento bag
- Type: Privately held company
- Industry: Reusable packaging
- Founded: 2008; 18 years ago in Los Angeles, California U.S.
- Founders: Jennie Nigrosh and Rick Siegel
- Headquarters: Los Angeles, California, United States
- Products: Reusable dry cleaning garment bags
- Website: thegreengarmento.com

The Green Garmento is a reusable packaging product introduced by Jennie Nigrosh as an alternative to single-use dry cleaning plastic bags. It is a multipurpose, reusable garment bag which also serves as a hanging hamper, duffel bag, and dry cleaning/pick-up bag. The Green Garmento also offers additional sustainable products for laundry, storage, travel, and organization.

== History ==
Jennie Nigrosh created the reusable and eco-friendly Green Garmento to replace single-use plastic dry-cleaning bags and twist ties as an environmentally safer alternative to single-use plastic and wire hangers used each year by the dry cleaning industry. With the help of her husband, Rick Siegel, Nigrosh launched the company in 2008.

Nigrosh's basis for launching The Green Garmento was to lower the global carbon footprint by supplying sustainable packaging to corporations and consumers and to eliminate the use of single-use plastic bags. The breathable garment bags, which are made of the same non-woven polypropylene material as most grocery shopping bags can be made from post industrial and post consumer materials that are recyclable. The company offers a take-back program for consumers and corporations unable to recycle their Garmento products. The company also has an opt-in donation to various charities and environmental causes.

== Application ==
The Green Garmento is used as an alternative to dry cleaning plastic bags in over one thousand dry cleaning stores and chains in the United States as well as dry cleaners and hotels in twenty-eight countries. It is also being used in the hospitality industry including Hyatt, Four Seasons, Fairmont, Intercontinental, Cavallo Point, and more. The Green Garmento has been showcased in goodie bags at the Academy Awards.

The Deluxe Green Garmento is made from recyclable non-woven polypropylene and is offered in eight colors and four lengths.

== Recognition ==
In 2009, the company won the Design Defined Award from The International Housewares Association and in 2010, won Entrepreneur (magazine)'s Top 100 Brilliant Companies to Watch.

Nigrosh appeared on the TV show, Shark Tank, in 2013, and The Green Garmento has been featured on KTRK-TV ABC-13 Houston and KUTV News Salt Lake City.

== Founders ==
Jennie Nigrosh and her husband, Rick Siegel are the creators and marketers of The Green Garmento. Prior to the launch of the company, Siegel was a personal manager. Nigrosh held a position at Warner Bros. Records as a creative copyrighter, creating and managing advertising campaigns for new album and soundtrack releases.
