= Paul Hatch =

British industrial designer

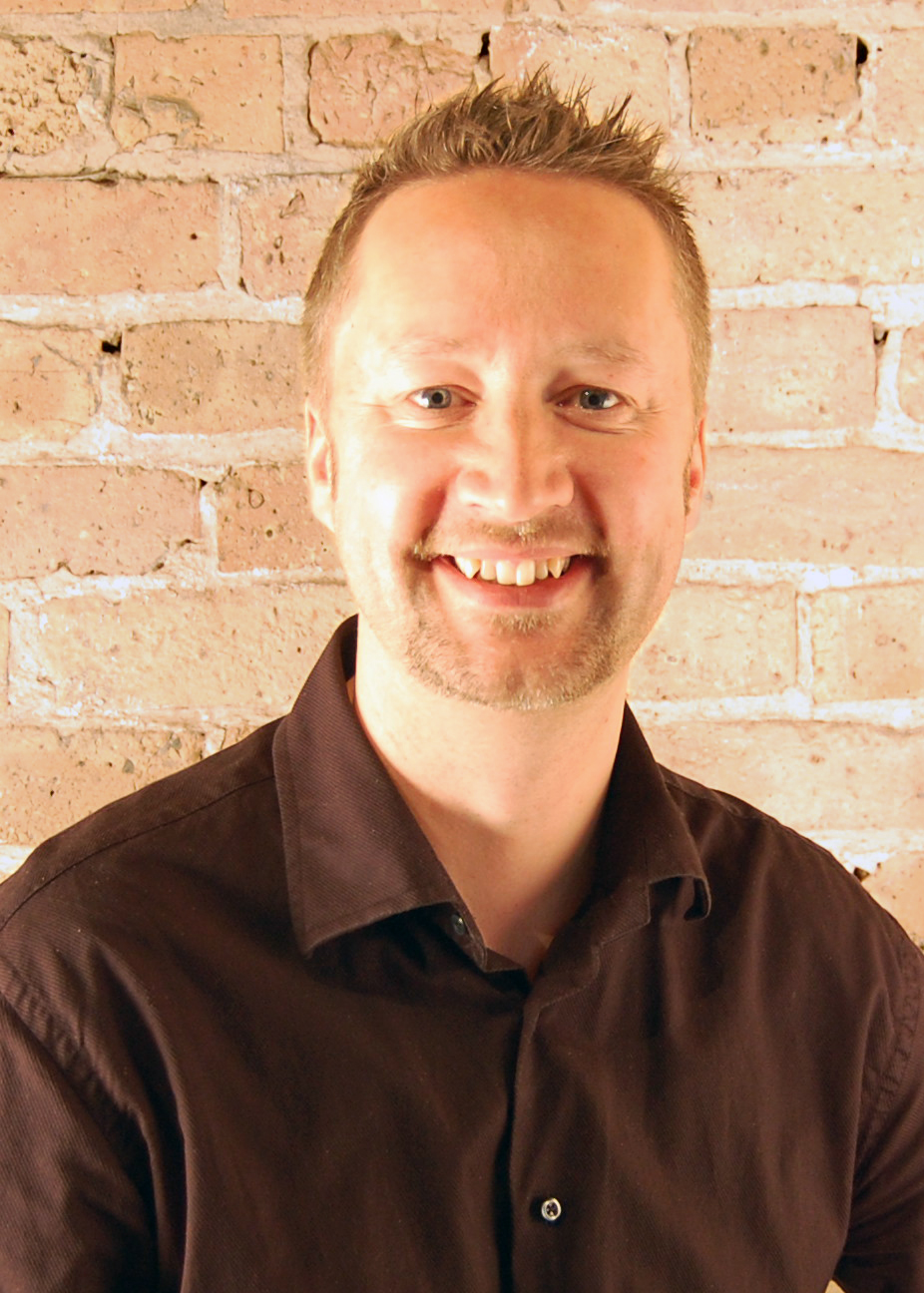
Photograph of Paul Hatch, President of TEAMS Design

Paul Hatch (born 1969, Lichfield, United Kingdom) is a British industrial designer and is the founder / CEO of TEAMS Design USA, a global product design consultancy. Together with management consultant Kearney, Hatch also co-founded PERlab, a division of Kearney.

== History ==
Hatch graduated in 1993 with a bachelor's degree in industrial design from Northumbria University. He went to work for TEAMS Design GmbH in Esslingen in 1994. In 1998 he was tasked with opening Teams Design's first satellite office in Chicago, Illinois. He is regularly invited to lecture at various universities and organizations both locally and internationally. Hatch served his local design colleagues as the Industrial Designers Society of America (IDSA) Midwest District Vice-President from 2004–2006. During that time period, he organized three district conferences for IDSA.

Hatch was the elected conference chair for the 2013 IDSA International Conference in Chicago called "Breaking the Rules". In April 2009, Hatch was the third design professional ever to be awarded the IDSA Midwest Honors for Outstanding Achievement. Hatch is also regularly invited to lecture students at colleges and universities across the US. Hatch recently finished up serving as the IDSA Director of Conference Experience and sat on the Board of Directors.

Hatch is the co-founder of the non-profit organization "Design House" (founded 2012) whose mission is to revitalize local manufacture through design". Together with Pam Daniels and Susan Page Estes he created a process in which idea generation at public "Design Jam" events would help diversify the portfolios of selected local manufacturers, with the goal to bolster their longevity. This method differed from traditional design idea generation in that it started with the specialisms and constraints of the selected manufacturers, rather than starting with an idea and then finding a manufacturer. The latter option often leads to outsourcing offshore manufacturing, which was the issue this method addressed. The initial Design Jams were hosted in Chicago but then spread to other cities seeking restabilization of the local industries, including San Francisco, Detroit, St. Louis, Pittsburgh, and Cincinnati. In 2015 Hatch and Estes were invited to the White House by Penny Pritzker and the Barack Obama administration as part of discussions on how to revitalize local manufacture.

Hatch is also the founder of "Fight Club" (2002-2013), an open public debate event that took place in darkened warehouses, where two experts ("fighters") would debate within a chalk circle, surrounded by the standing audience ("The crowd"). Like the namesake movie Fight Club, there were "no rules" to the debate and the audience could interject at any time. This provided for an intense, open debate of a range of subjects such as the death penalty, censorship, the legalization of marijuana, and human cloning. One "fight" got featured on ABC (American Broadcasting Company), which led to shooting a pilot for a television series. The New York Times called the non-holds barred event a "Designer Slugfest".

In 2018 Hatch was one of two people inducted into the IDSA Academy of Fellows, the IDSA's Designer Hall of Fame that includes designers such as Raymond Loewy, Henry Dreyfuss, Bill Moggridge, Niels Diffrient, and Jay Doblin.

== Personal life ==
Hatch has since pursued his PhD in Learning Sciences and been affiliate faculty at the University of Illinois Chicago (UIC) School of Design. He met his wife Jacqueline while working in Germany; they have two sons. Hatch is involved in various community volunteer projects and still contributes to the IDSA and the local design community.

== Design Awards ==
iF Product Design Awards

- 2010 Mr. Coffee Optimal Brew Thermal Coffeemaker,

ID Magazine Annual Design Review

- 2010 Robert Bosch Full Force Pneumatic Nail Guns

Appliance Design EID Awards

- 2010 Federal Signal Automated Parking Products Universal One & Universal PS
- 2010 Robert Bosch Full Force Pneumatic Nail Guns
- 2010 Sunbeam Products Flat Panel Heater

Appliance Design EID Awards

- 2011 Silver Award Business Machine – HoMedics Inc. Black & Decker Hanging Crosscut 6-Sheet Paper Shredder
- 2011 Silver Award Small Appliances – Robert Bosch Corp., 12" Dual-Bevel Glide Miter Saw
- 2011 Silver Award Small Appliances – HoMedics Inc., Black & Decker iShred
- 2011 Bronze Award Small Appliances – Jarden Consumer Solutions, Mr. Coffee Optimal Brew Thermal Coffeemaker* 2009 Robert Bosch RS35 Reciprocating Saw
- 2010 Silver Award – Federal Signal Automated Parking Products Universal One & Universal PS
- 2010 Silver Award – Robert Bosch Full Force Pneumatic Nail Guns
- 2010 Bronze Award – Sunbeam Products Flat Panel Heater
- 2009 Argus Camera Company Kid's Cameras Bean and Sprout

IHA Awards

- 2009 Wusthof-Trident Precision Edge Electric Knife Sharpener
- 2009 Smith's Edge Diamond Edge Electric Knife and Scissors Sharpener

ADEX Awards

- 2008 Mansfield Reo Bathroom Suite
- 2008 Mansfield Essence Bathroom Suite

Good Design Award

- 2009 Robert Bosch Pneumatic Nailers
- 2009 RS35 Demolition Reciprocating Saw
- 2009 Precise Path Robotics RG3 Robotic Greens Mower
- 2008 Argus Camera Kid's Cameras Bean and Sprout
- 2005 LR Nelson Costco 3 Piece Nozzle Set

Design of the Decade (IDSA /BusinessWeek)

- 2000 Karcher Full Line of Power Washers

I.D. Magazine

- 2000 Siemens Easy Control Climate Control Unit

IDEA

- 2009 Argus Bean Children's Digital Camera

Spark Award Bronze

- Precise Path RG3 Mower

iF Product Design Awards

- 2001 Karcher HDS 698 CSX Heated Pressure Washer
- 2000 Siemens Easy Control Climate Control Unit

Red Star Design Awards
