= Wüsthof =

German knife maker

- Industry: Kitchenware
- Founded: 1814; 212 years ago
- Headquarters: Solingen, Germany
- Area served: Worldwide
- Key people: Harald Wüsthof, Viola Wüsthof
- Products: Kitchen knives, accessories
- Revenue: €56 million (2017)
- Number of employees: 480 (2018)
- Website: wusthof.com

Wüsthof (German pronunciation: [ˈvyːsthoːf], often styled in all capital letters; also known as Wüsthof Dreizackwerk (German) and Wüsthof Trident (English); sometimes spelled Wusthof or Wuesthof) is a knife-maker based in Solingen, Germany. The company's main products are kitchen knives for domestic and professional use. Wüsthof is one of the largest manufacturers of chef's knives.

Wüsthof knives are manufactured in Solingen east of Düsseldorf, Germany where around 400 of the company's 480 employees work. Wüsthof's trademark is a trident in a circle. The brand is sold in over 80 countries worldwide. In North America, traditionally the largest market for Wüsthof products, the company operates two local distribution subsidiaries.

== History ==
Johann Abraham Wüsthof's Solingen "Shears factory, steel and iron works" is first mentioned in local records in 1814. The factory, one of many of its kind at the time, operated out of a so-called 'Kotten', a small grinding workshop with water-driven grindstones. In the early years, Wüsthof worked on commission for larger firms and did not yet have its own trademark. Johann Abraham's son, Eduard Wüsthof, introduced pocket knives as a second mainstay product in 1836. The 1869 company directory listed the firm as a "Factory and warehouse for all kinds of forged shears, pocket and penknives, daggers, table knives and forks, bread, vegetable, butcher knives, etc." Eduard's sons, Robert and Eduard, moved the company to the current headquarters, and built a steam engine-powered factory which began production around 1880. In 1881, Robert Wüsthof took a selection of shears and pocket knives to New York and established the company's first trade relationship with the U.S.

In 1895, the trident was registered with the Imperial Patent Office in Berlin as the company's trademark. Brand recognition rose as Wüsthof showcased at industrial and commercial exhibitions both at home and abroad, such as the 1902 Düsseldorf exhibition; production increased and further diversified, with facilities for nickel-plating and separate divisions for razor blades, scissors and cutlery. The 1904 Wüsthof catalog shows, amongst other wares, 1125 different models of pocket knives on 48 pages. In the 1930s, knife production was switched to stainless steel.

Although much of Solingen was destroyed toward the end of World War II, the Wüsthof plant remained mostly intact, and production was resumed soon after the war ended. However, the firm's outdated equipment and reliance on manual labour proved to be a liability; in the 1970s, Wüsthof replaced the old factory building with new facilities with partially-automated production lines, removing pocket knives, shears and cutlery from its product range and concentrating on knives for professional and home use. In 1986, the first robot was installed in the Wüsthof factory. In 1987, Wusthof-Trident of America, Inc. was founded to serve the company's most important export market. Its sister company, Wusthof-Trident of Canada, was established in 2012. In 2023, Wüsthof UK was established. In 2002 and 2014 the second and third production facilities in Lindgesfeld (the business park in Solingen), came into operation, and in 2019, Wüsthof opened its first branded store, also in Solingen.

== Company overview ==
Wüsthof knives have been made in Solingen by the family-owned business since 1814. The company is currently headed by cousins Harald and Viola Wüsthof. It operates three production facilities and an R&D department in the "City of Blades", where the Wüsthof knives are designed and manufactured.

The company's international distribution network spans over 80 countries; around 80% of Wüsthof's revenues are generated outside Germany. In the U.S. and Canada, distribution is coordinated by the subsidiaries Wusthof Trident of America Inc. (WUSA), headquartered in Norwalk, Connecticut, and Wusthof Trident of Canada (WCAN), located in Ottawa. Wüsthof regularly exhibits at international trade fairs including Maison et Objet (Paris), Ambiente (Frankfurt), International Home + Housewares Show (Chicago), and Spring Fair (Birmingham).

== Production ==
The Wüsthof production facilities in Solingen are highly automated, with more than 100 robots performing many steps in the knife-making process, while specific tasks such as the finishing of the edges and surfaces, and the final honing of the blade, are still completed manually.

Most Wüsthof knives are precision-forged, except for the laser-cut (stamped) Gourmet, Silverpoint and Urban Farmer series. Forged and stamped knives differ in the steps employed to manufacture the knife blanks: the basic shape and the integral bolster of forged blades are precision forged in a die at 2200 °F (1200 °C) and then hardened at 1920 °F (1050 °C), while stamped blanks are laser-cut from a stainless steel plate. Wüsthof forged knives have more than 54 steps in their manufacturing process; stamped Wüsthof knives have over 40. For blade sharpening, Wüsthof employs its proprietary automated PEtec procedure ("Precision Edge technology"): the optimum tilt of the blade during the automated sharpening process is computed based on individual laser measurements of each blade, thus ensuring consistent results. German-style knives are sharpened to an angle of 14 degrees per side; Japanese-style knives are sharpened to an angle of 10 degrees per side.

=== Steel ===
All Wüsthof knives, except for the Silverpoint series (made with steel grade X46Cr13), have the formula "X50CrMoV15" etched into their blade, signifying that the single block of corrosion resistant steel alloy it is made from contains 0.5% carbon, 15% chromium and unspecified smaller amounts of molybdenum and vanadium. The German DIN standard name of the alloy is X50CrMoV15, with material number (W-Nr standard) 1.4116.

== Products ==
=== Knife series ===
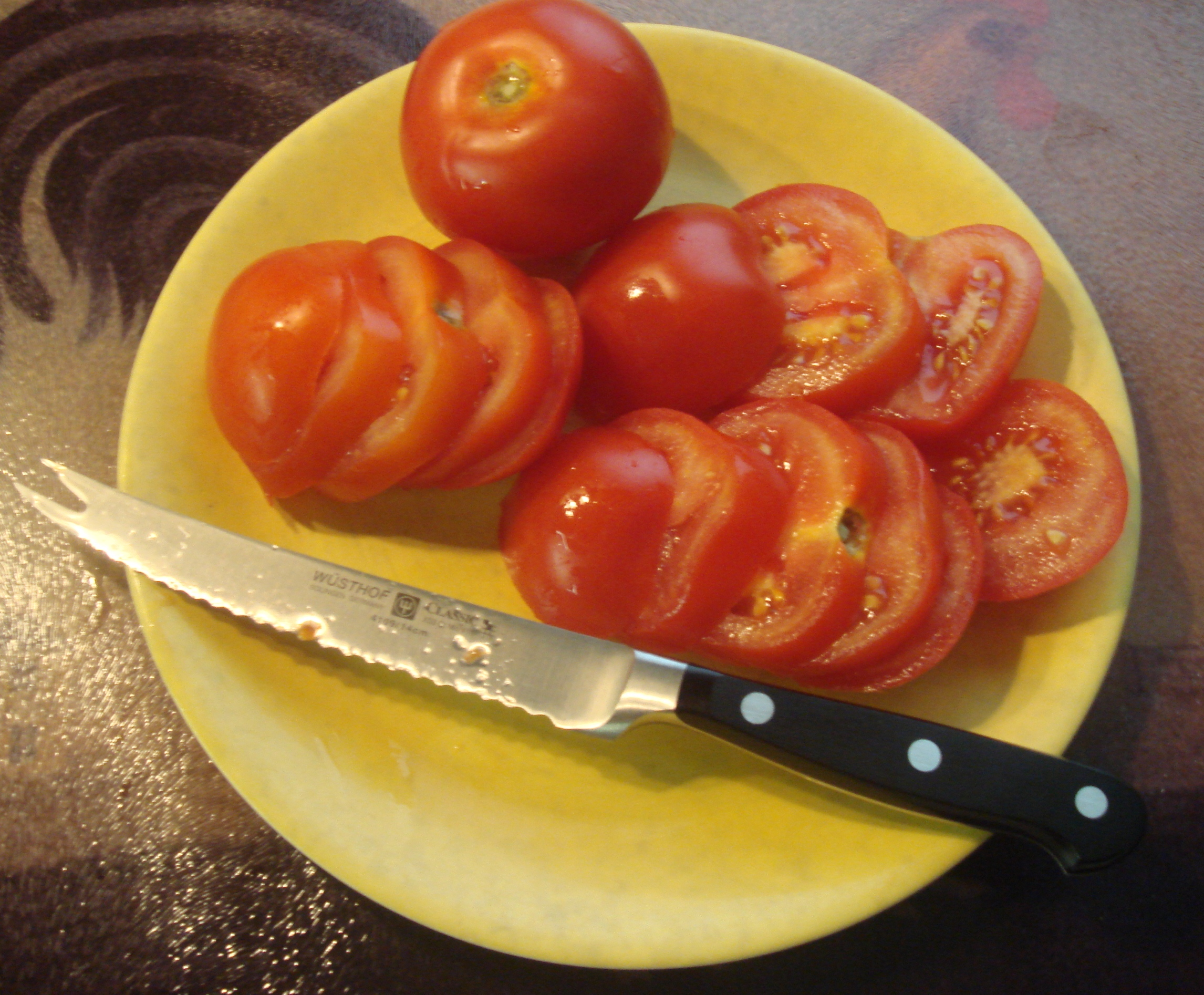
Classic series tomato knife with tomatoes

- Classic – forged, full-length bolster, full tang, finished with traditional, triple-riveted polyoxymethylene black handle; some newer additions with half-bolster; with around 70 different items, the series offers almost the entire range of Wüsthof blade forms and sizes (chef's knives, Santoku, Nakiri, and Chai Dao Asian-style knives, peeling, paring, boning, trimming and carving knives, tomato knives, bread knives, utility knives, palette knives, sausage and cheese knives, fillet knives, butcher knives and steak knives)
- Classic Ikon – forged, half-bolster, full tang, second ("double") bolster on butt, with curved ergonomic handle (almost identical to Ikon line), finished with triple-riveted black polyoxymethylene (also used in Classic line)
- Classic Ikon Crème - Classic Ikon featuring white handles
- Ikon – forged, half-bolster, full tang, second ("double") bolster on butt, with triple-riveted curved ergonomic handle finished with African blackwood
- Grand Prix II – forged, full-length bolster, full tang with rivet-free ergonomic polypropylene black handle concealing tang
- Epicure – forged, full tang, slightly wider blade shapes with full- or half-bolster for some models, rounded, two-riveted handle of a composite material combining resin and cellulose fibre
- Crafter - forged, full tang, full- or half-bolster, handle of smoked oak, fixed to tang with three brass rivets
- Gourmet – stamped, no bolster, full tang, finished with triple-riveted polyoxymethylene black handle; series comprises over 40 different items
- Silverpoint – stamped, no bolster, finished with ergonomic, non-riveted polypropylene black handle concealing tang
- Urban Farmer – stamped, beechwood handle, non-slip bolster of thermoplastic rubber; the series features, among other models, a curved harvesting knife and a machete

=== Discontinued series ===
- Emerilware – stamped, no bolster, full tang (3/4 tang on knives shorter than 5 inches), triple-riveted polypropylene black handle; name changed to Gourmet
- Emerilware (v2) – stamped, no bolster, finished with ergonomic, non-riveted polypropylene black handle concealing tang; name changed to Silverpoint
- Emeril Pro – forged with full-length bolster and full-length tang and finished with triple-rivet micarta handle
- Grand Prix – forged, full-length bolster, full tang, finished with black rivet-free traditional polypropylene handle concealing tang
- Grand Prix II Colour – forged, full-length bolster, full tang with rivet-free ergonomic polypropylene handle concealing tang; four colors to aid in food preparation safety by preventing cross-contamination (blue = fish, yellow = poultry, green = vegetables, red = meat)
- Le Cordon Bleu – forged, half-bolster, full tang, triple-riveted polyoxymethylene black handle; advertised 30% weight reduction versus Classic line, made in partnership with Le Cordon Bleu culinary school
- Pro – stamped, no bolster, partial tang, dual-grip polypropylene black handle; intended for professional kitchens that do not require chefs to bring their own knives
- Pro Colour – stamped, no bolster, partial tang, dual-grip polypropylene handle; intended for professional kitchens which do not require chefs to bring their own knives; four colors to aid in food preparation safety by preventing cross-contamination (blue = fish, yellow = poultry, green = vegetables, red = meat)
- XLine – forged, 'X' design bolster, full tang, second ("double") bolster on butt, finished with transparent ceramic coating on blade, triple-riveted transition black handle
- Culinar – forged, full bolster, full tang, stainless steel handle shells

=== Knife sharpening ===
Wüsthof offers a variety of products for honing and sharpening knives. The product range comprises honing steels in various lengths with handle designs to match some of the knife series, steel sharpeners coated with industrial diamonds, sharpeners with a ceramic shaft, whetstones, and ceramic knife-sharpeners with pre-set angles.

=== Knife storage and cutting bases ===
For knife storage, Wüsthof sells knife blocks, magnetic holders, and organizers for use in drawers, as well as in hard and soft cases, roll-up bags, and blade guards for transport. The company also offers cutting bases made from wood and thermoplastic polyurethane.

== Awards and top-rated series ==
Both the Classic and Grand Prix lines were the top rated knives in a test of knives by Consumer Reports in November 2005, and are consistently given high ratings by Cook's Illustrated magazine. The 16 cm Chef's knife from the Classic series was voted best chef's knife in 2019 by Ideal Home magazine.

Wüsthof has received several Housewares Design Awards in the cutlery category. The 12 cm Asian Utility Knife (2018), the 18 cm Ultimate Everyday Knife (2017), the 23 cm Double Serrated Bread Knife (2014), and the 29 cm Panini Knife (2008), all from the Classic series, were rated best in category in the respective years.

== Professional users ==
Wüsthof is an official partner of and supplier to the German (Verband der Köche Deutschlands) and Japanese (All Japan Chefs Association) Chefs Associations. In this capacity, it acts as a supplier to the national chef teams of both countries.

Wüsthof collaborates with famous chefs worldwide including Martha Stewart (Classic range), Gordon Ramsay (Classic Ikon range), Jamie Oliver (both Classic and Ikon), James Martin (Culinar), Michael Cox, and Emeril Lagasse (Emeril) who endorse and use Wüsthof knives.
