= Akira Back =

American chef (born 1974)

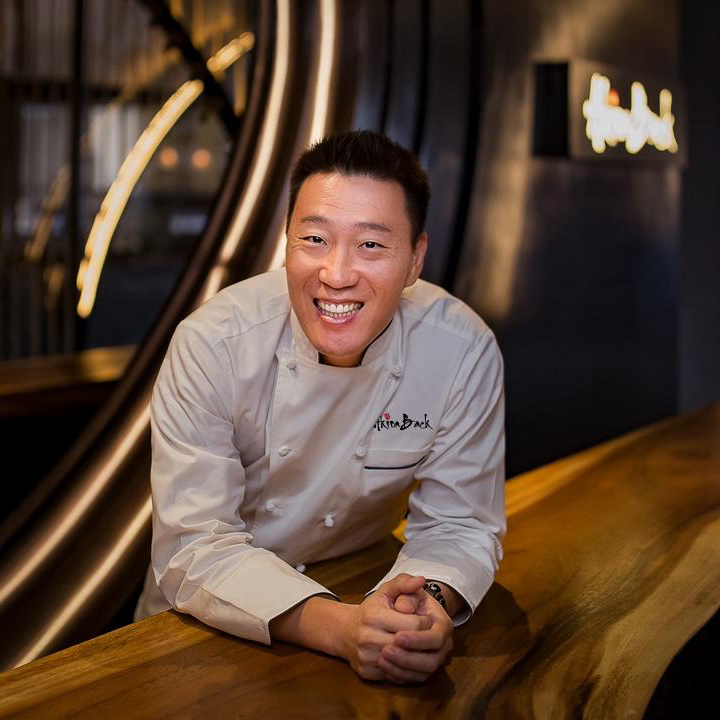
- Chef Akira Back
- Born: Sung Ook Back; 1974 (age 51–52); Seoul, South Korea
- Occupations: Chef, Restaurateur
- Notable work: Akira Back restaurants, ABSteak, Dosa
- Awards: Michelin Star for Dosa (Seoul)
- Website: akiraback.com

Akira Back (born 1974), birth name Sung Ook Back (Korean: 백성욱), is an American chef and restaurateur known for his innovative interpretations of Japanese and Korean cuisine. He operates a global portfolio of 28 restaurants, including the Michelin-starred Dosa in Seoul.

== Early life ==
Back was born and raised in Seoul, Korea. He took a serious interest in baseball at a young age, but his baseball career ended shortly afterward when his father’s business took the family to the U.S. in 1989, eventually settling in Aspen, Colorado.

At age 15, Back began his snowboarding career and spent 7 years on the professional snowboarding circuit. He appeared in various extreme sports movies. During the same period, he worked at local Japanese restaurants to supplement his earnings. This motivated him to pursue a culinary career. He enrolled at The Art Institute in Colorado to study at the International Culinary School.

== Culinary career ==
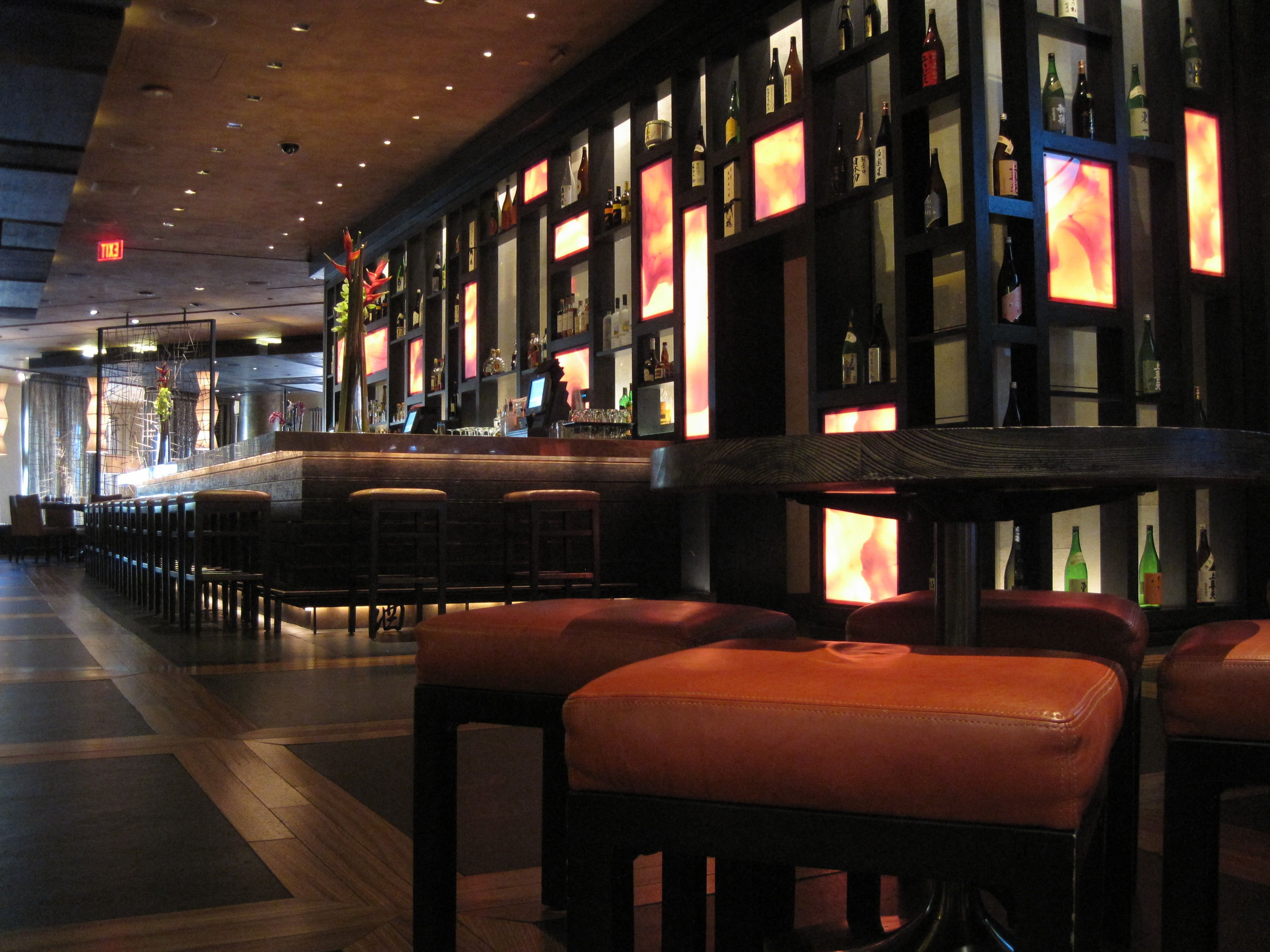
Lounge at Yellowtail Japanese Restaurant & Lounge in Las Vegas

After ending his snowboarding career, Back went on to study at the International Culinary School at The Art Institute of Colorado. In 1993, he began his first culinary job working at Kenichi in Aspen as sushi prep cook. He was later recruited to Kenichi in Austin, Texas and then in Kona, Hawaii, where he worked as the opening chef.

In 2008, Back debuted Yellowtail Japanese Restaurant & Lounge at Bellagio Resort & Casino in Las Vegas. Featured dishes include Bigeye Tuna Pizza and Maine Lobster Carpaccio.

In 2017, Back's Dosa earned a Michelin Star.

=== Iron Chef ===
In 2008, Chef Akira Back appeared on the television show Iron Chef America, competing against Iron Chef Bobby Flay. The episode, titled "Flay vs. Back," featured a culinary battle with spinach as the secret ingredient. Chef Back showcased his innovative approach to Asian cuisine, further elevating his profile in the culinary world.

== Restaurants ==
=== North America ===
- Yellowtail by Akira Back – Las Vegas (Bellagio Hotel & Casino)
- Akira Back – Toronto (Bisha Hotel)
- Akira Back – Ottawa (Château Laurier, Fairmont Hotel)
- TONO by Akira Back – Toronto (W Toronto Hotel)
- Akira Back – Delray Beach (The Ray Hotel)
- ABSteak – San Francisco (Union Square)
- ABSteak – Beverly Hills (Beverly Center)
- Lumi Rooftop by Akira Back – San Diego (Gaslamp District)
- Salt & the Cellar by Akira Back – Orlando (Ette Hotel)
- Norikaya – Los Angeles (K-Town)

=== South America ===
- Akira Back – Aruba (St. Regis Hotel)

=== Europe ===
- Lilli by Akira Back – London (Montcalm Mayfair Hotel)
- Akira Back – Paris (Prince de Galles Hotel)
- Dosa – London (Mandarin Oriental Hotel)
- Akira Back – Istanbul (JW Marriott Marmara Sea Hotel)

=== Middle East ===
- Akira Back – Dubai (W Hotel)
- Akira Back – Riyadh (Diplomatic Quarter)
- Namu – Riyadh (Esplanade)
- TONO by Akira Back – Doha, Qatar (The Pearl Island)

=== Asia ===
- Akira Back – Seoul (Four Seasons Hotel)
- Akira Back – Singapore (JW Marriott)
- Akira Back – Bangkok (Marriott Marquis)
- ABar Rooftop & Lounge – Bangkok (Marriott Marquis)
- ABSteak & ABar – Jakarta (Senayan City)

=== Africa ===
- Akira Back Rooftop – Marrakech
