= Simplehuman =

Designer and manufacturer

- Type: Private
- Founded: 2000
- Founder: Frank Yang
- Headquarters: Torrance, California, U.S.
- Key people: Frank Yang (CEO and founder)
- Products: Trash cans; Kitchen and bath tools; Organization tools
- Number of employees: ~100
- Website: simplehuman.com

Simplehuman, LLC is a privately owned designer and manufacturer of kitchen, bath, and beauty tools based in Torrance, California.

== History ==
In 2000, Simplehuman was founded by Frank Yang, who immigrated to the United States from Taiwan in 1982 and later started the company with the idea of making a better trash can. He showed his design and received his first orders at the International Home and Housewares Show from retailers such as The Container Store and Bed Bath & Beyond. The company was originally called Canworks due to its focus on trash cans, but Yang changed the name to Simplehuman in 2001 when the company began to broaden its product line into other kitchen and bath tools, under the tagline “Tools for Efficient Living.” In 2003, Simplehuman opened a UK subsidiary in Oxfordshire, England to serve the European market.

== Awards ==
- The European Consumer Choice Awards in 2011 for the steel frame dishrack
- The European Consumer Choice Awards in 2012 for the butterfly sensor can
- The Housewares Design Award in 2013 for the semi-round sensor can
