= The Mistake on the Lake =

The Mistake on the Lake or The Mistake by the Lake is a pejorative term referring to:

- Cleveland, a city in the U.S. state of Ohio located on the southern shore of Lake Erie
  - Cleveland Stadium, a former professional sports venue in Cleveland
- Erie, Pennsylvania, a city also located on the southern shore of Lake Erie
- Exhibition Stadium, a former sports venue in Toronto, Ontario, Canada, on the northern shore of Lake Ontario
- New Soldier Field, a professional sports venue in Chicago, Illinois, U.S.
- The Lakeside Center portion of McCormick Place, a convention center in Chicago, Illinois, U.S.
