= Metropolitan Pier and Exposition Authority =

- Company type: Municipal corporation
- Industry: Expo center
- Founded: 1989
- Headquarters: Chicago, Illinois
- Website: www.mpea.com

The Metropolitan Pier and Exposition Authority, commonly known as MPEA or McPier, is a municipal corporation that owns Navy Pier and McCormick Place in Chicago. It also manages the city's collection of taxes for vehicles picking up passengers (including limousines, buses, airport shuttles, taxicabs and Uber/Lyft) for O'Hare International Airport and Midway International Airport.

MPEA was created by the Illinois General Assembly in 1989 by the "Metropolitan Pier and Exposition Authority Act". The authority's responsibilities in the McCormick Place campus include the Hyatt Regency McCormick Place hotel and the Marriott Marquis Chicago hotel.

In 2011, the MPEA handed over operations of Navy Pier to the newly established Navy Pier Inc, a 501(c)(3) not-for-profit corporation and hired a world-wide venue management company, SMG, to run the operations of McCormick Place.

In 2017, MPEA completed the 10,387-seat Wintrust Arena adjacent to McCormick Place as well as an additional hotel tower. It became home to the men's and women's basketball teams of DePaul University as well as hosting other events.
