= International Housewares Association =

International Housewares Association (IHA)
- Type: Trade Organization
- Location: 6400 Shafer Ct, Ste. 650, Rosemont, IL 60018, United States.
- Members: 1,600+
- Website: http://www.housewares.org

The International Housewares Association is a not-for-profit, full-service trade organization that has been promoting the sales and marketing of housewares since 1938. The association has more than 1,600 member companies from more than 40 countries. It is well-known for its annual The Inspired Home Show that is held in March at McCormick Place in Chicago. Member services include industry and government advocacy, export assistance, state of the industry reports, a quarterly newsletter with POS and consumer panel data, executive management peer groups and group discounts for business solution services. In addition, the association also offers educational support to the Housewares Design Awards to help promote the importance of design in the housewares industry.
