= Marriott Marquis =

Marriott Marquis is a hotel brand owned by Marriott International and denotes flagship, large-format hotels similar to Hyatt's Grand Hyatt brand. Notable hotels using this branding include:

United States

- New York Marriott Marquis in Times Square, New York City
- Atlanta Marriott Marquis in Atlanta, Georgia
- JW Marriott Marquis Miami in Miami, Florida
- San Francisco Marriott Marquis in San Francisco, California
- Marriott Marquis San Diego Marina in San Diego, California
- Washington Marriott Marquis in Washington, D.C.
- Marriott Marquis Houston in Houston, Texas
- Marriott Marquis Chicago in Chicago, Illinois

International

- JW Marriott Marquis Dubai in Dubai, United Arab Emirates
- Bangkok Marriott Marquis Queen's Park in Bangkok, Thailand
