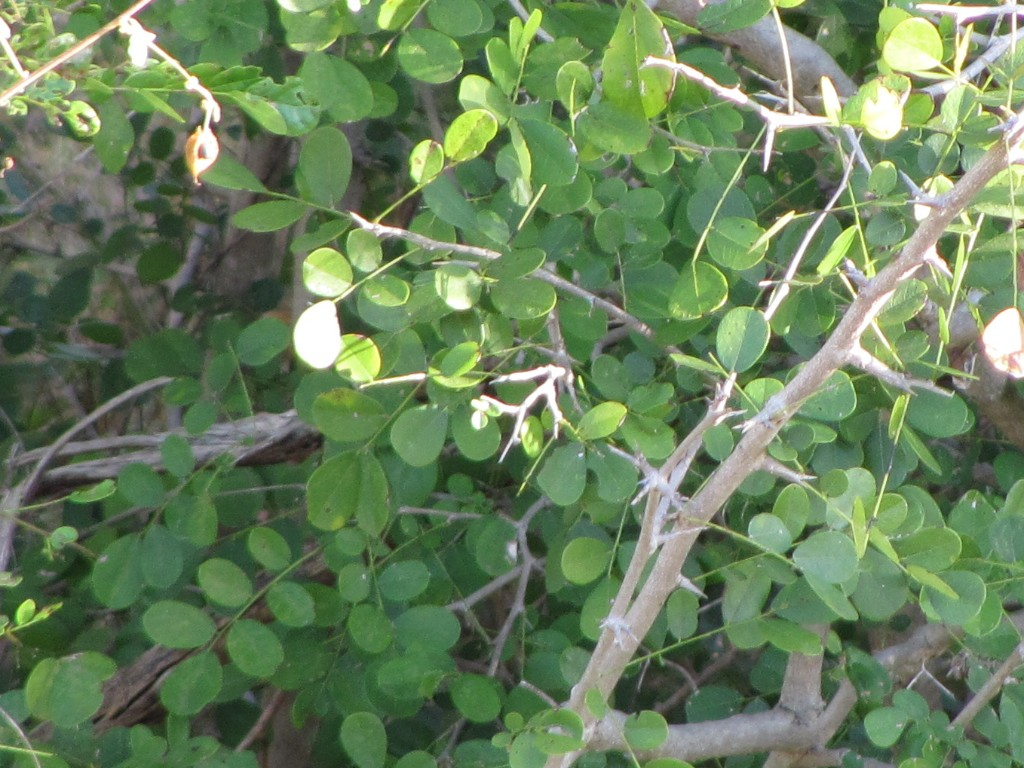

Conservation status
- Near Threatened (IUCN 3.1)

Scientific classification
- Kingdom: Plantae
- Clade: Tracheophytes
- Clade: Angiosperms
- Clade: Eudicots
- Clade: Rosids
- Order: Fabales
- Family: Fabaceae
- Subfamily: Faboideae
- Genus: Dalbergia
- Species: D. melanoxylon

Binomial name
- Dalbergia melanoxylon Guill. & Perr.

Synonyms
- Amerimnon melanoxylon (Guill. & Perr.) Kuntze; Amerimnon stocksii (Benth.) Kuntze; Dalbergia stocksii Benth.

= Dalbergia melanoxylon =

African blackwood

Species of plant

Dalbergia melanoxylon (African blackwood, grenadilla, or mpingo) is a flowering plant in the subfamily Faboideae of the family Fabaceae, native to seasonally dry regions of Africa from Senegal east to Eritrea, to central and southern regions of Tanzania to Mozambique and south to the north-eastern parts of South Africa. The tree is an important timber species in its native areas; it is used in the manufacture of musical instruments, sculptures vinyago in Swahili language and fine furniture. Populations and genomic resources for genetic biodiversity maintenance in parts of its native range are threatened by overharvesting due to poor or absent conservation planning and by the species' low germination rates.

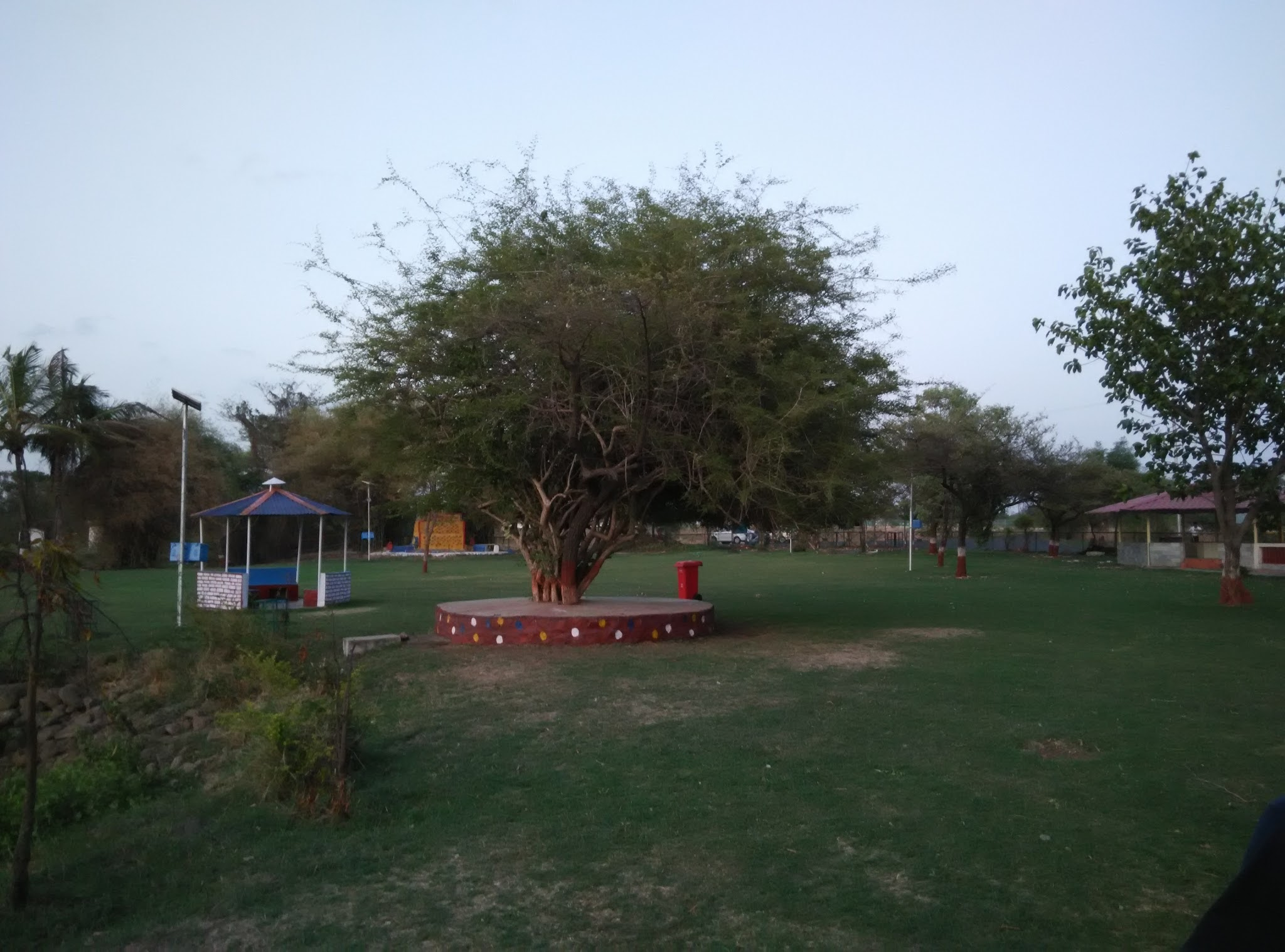
African blackwood in a garden in Pune, India, showing its rounded, irregular canopy with low branching and coppicing.

African blackwood is a small tree, reaching 4–15 m tall, with grey bark and spiny shoots. The leaves are deciduous in the dry season, alternate, 6–22 cm long, pinnately compound, with 6–9 alternately arranged leaflets. The flowers are white and produced in dense clusters. The fruit is a pod 3–7 cm long, containing one to two seeds. It is often cited as one of the most expensive woods in the world.

== Uses ==
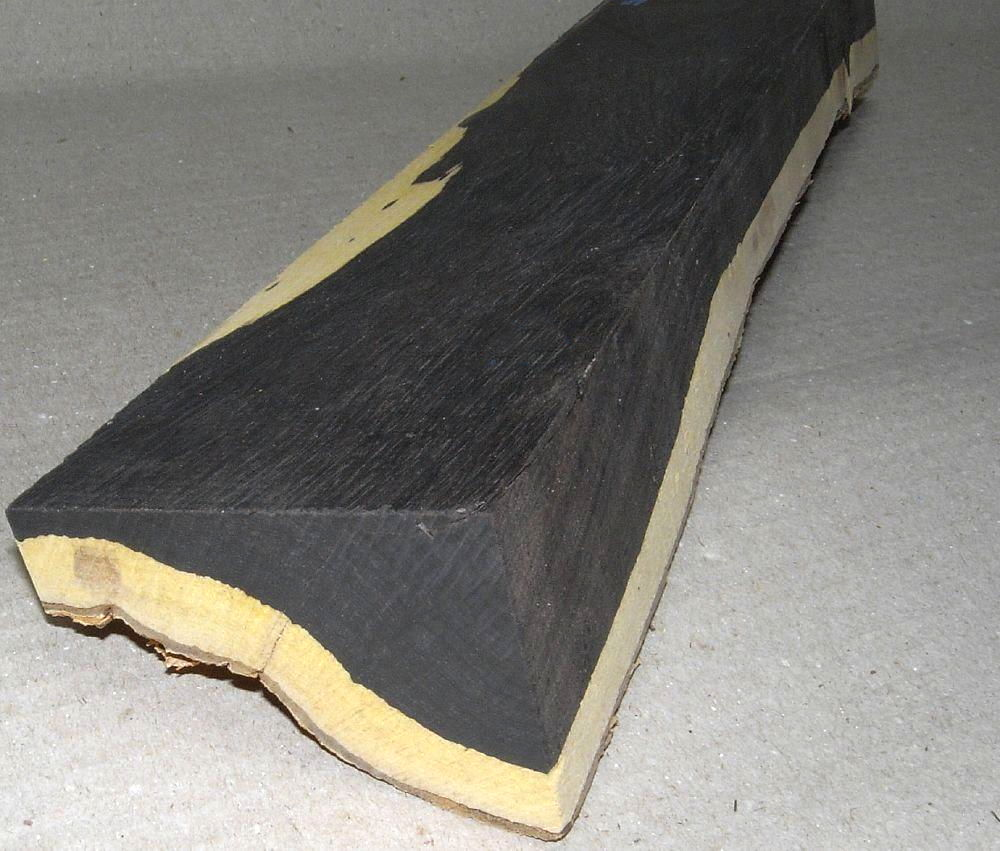
African blackwood showing its lustrous black colour and yellow coloured sapwood.

The dense, lustrous wood ranges in colour from reddish to pure black. It is generally cut into small billets or logs with its sharply demarcated bright yellow-white sapwood left on to assist in the slow drying so as to prevent cracks developing. Good quality "A" grade African blackwood commands high prices on the commercial timber market. The timber is used mainly because of its machinability, density, dimensional stability, and moisture repellence. Those properties are particularly valued when used in woodwind instruments, principally clarinets, oboes, transverse flutes, piccolos, recorders, Highland pipes, and Northumbrian pipes. The Deering Banjo Company uses blackwood ("grenadilla") to construct the tone ring in its John Hartford-model banjo because it weighs less than brass or bronze tone rings, and that the wood "plays in" (improves in tone) with use. Furniture makers from ancient Egypt on have valued this timber. A story states that it has even been used as ballast in trading ships and that some enterprising Northumbrian pipe makers used old discarded blackwood ballast to great effect. The German knife companies Wüsthof, Böker and J. A. Henckels sell knives with blackwood handles due to the wood's moisture repellent qualities.

Due to overuse, the mpingo tree is severely threatened in Kenya and is needing attention in Tanzania and Mozambique. The trees are being harvested at an unsustainable rate, partly because of illegal smuggling of the wood into Kenya, but also because the tree takes upwards of 60 years to mature.

African blackwood is often cited as one of the most expensive woods in the world, along with sandalwood, pink ivory, agarwood and ebony.

In woodturning, African Blackwood can maintain a fine edge without splintering due to its hardness and density, though it dulls tools considerably faster than other woods. While being turned, it creates a sweet, rose-like aroma.

=== Relation to other woods ===
- African blackwood is no longer regarded as ebony, a name now reserved for a limited number of timbers yielded by the genus Diospyros; these are more of a matt appearance and are more brittle.
- The genus Dalbergia yields other notable timbers, widely known as palisander (true rosewood), such as Dalbergia nigra (Brazilian rosewood), Dalbergia cearensis, Dalbergia retusa (cocobolo) and several others.
- D. melanoxylon is the hardest known wood, requiring 2000 kg to force a ball bearing one square centimetre in cross-section into a sample.

== Names ==
Other names by which the tree is known include babanus and grenadilla, which appear as loanwords in various local English dialects.

== Conservation ==
There are multiple organisations involved in the conservation of African blackwood: the Mpingo Conservation & Development Initiative, the African Blackwood Conservation Project, and Daraja Music Initiative (formerly Clarinets for Conservation).

The Mpingo Conservation & Development Initiative (MCDI, formerly the Mpingo Conservation Project) is involved in research, awareness raising and practical conservation of African blackwood. Conservation of mpingo and its natural habitat can be achieved by ensuring that local people living in mpingo harvesting areas receive a fair share of the revenue created, thus providing them with an incentive to manage the habitat in an environmentally friendly manner. In order to achieve this, the MCDI is helping communities to get Forest Stewardship Certification.

The African blackwood Conservation Project works around Mount Kilimanjaro replanting African blackwood trees, and in conservation education. It also works with adult and women's groups in the promotion of environmentally sound land uses.

Daraja Music Initiative (formerly Clarinets for Conservation) is a U.S.-based non-profit that aims to raise awareness and promote conservation of mpingo through music education in Tanzania. Students participate in an interdisciplinary program during the summer months that raises awareness of the value of mpingo through musical performances, classroom instruction, and tree plantings at local secondary and primary schools.

Small growers in Naples, Florida have been successful in growing African blackwood there. Growth habit in Florida yields taller, larger trees, and the rich soil combined with ample nutrients and long growing season yields timber of superior quality at more sustainable rates.

== References and external links ==
- World Conservation Monitoring Centre (1998). "Dalbergia melanoxylon". IUCN Red List of Threatened Species. 1998 e.T32504A9710439. doi:10.2305/IUCN.UK.1998.RLTS.T32504A9710439.en.
- allAfrica.com - news on mpingo tree
- Winrock International - Dalbergia melanoxylon
- Global Trees - Mpingo
- Mpingo Conservation Project in Tanzania
- Inter Press Service (News Agency) - news on mpingo
- Dalbergia melanoxylon in West African plants – A Photo Guide.
