= Marriott Marquis Chicago =

Hotel in Chicago, Illinois

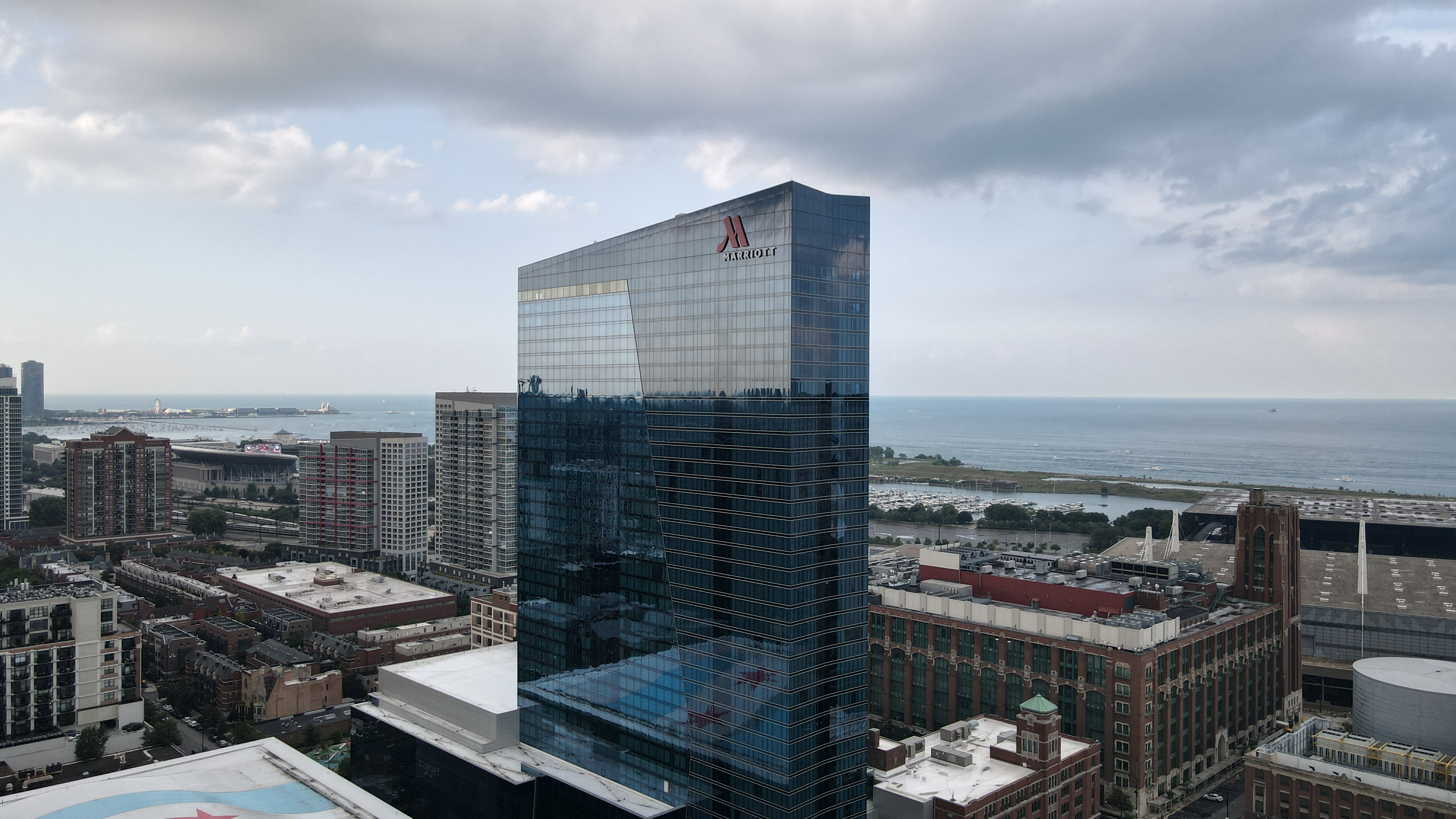
- Interactive map of the Marriott Marquis Chicago area

General information
- Location: 2121 South Prairie Avenue
- Coordinates: 41.854°N 87.621°W
- Opened: September 2017

Height
- Height: 135.33 m

Technical details
- Floor count: 39
- Lifts/elevators: 16

Other information
- Number of rooms: 1,161
- Number of suites: 44

Website
- www.marriott.com/hotels/travel/chimq-marriott-marquis-chicago/

Marriott Marquis Chicago is a 39-story hotel in Chicago, Illinois, United States. The hotel has 63 meeting rooms totaling 89,407 square feet of space, and is considered by some as an expansion of McCormick Place, given that the hotel and convention center are connected via an enclosed footbridge.
