= Housewares Design Awards =

American product design award

- Description: Excellence in product design within the housewares industry
- Country: United States
- Presented by: HomeWorld Business
- Website: http://www.housewaresdesignawards.com

The Housewares Design Awards was an American annual product design award competition focused on the housewares industry. The competition was introduced in 2003 by HomeWorld Business, a housewares industry trade publication, and ran through 2019. HomeWorld Business ceased paper publication in 2020 and digital publication in 2021.

The Housewares Design Awards attracted hundreds of product entries each year. These entries were evaluated by an independent panel of judges made up of designers and retailer buyers, a process managed by the Housewares Design Awards LLC.

Contest criteria included unique appearance, functionality, positioning, innovative technology or materials, safety, environmental benefits, emotional appeal, social impact and the ability to meet consumer needs.

Twelve "Best in Category" Awards and three "Best of the Best" awards were presented at the gold, silver and bronze levels. The "Green House Design Awards," which honor eco-friendly housewares products, were also given each year.

== Categories ==
- Cookware & Bakeware
- Countertop Cooking & Beverage Appliances
- Countertop Food Prep Appliances
- Countertop Kitchenware
- Cutlery
- Floor Care & Cleaning Appliances
- Gadgets & Kitchen Tools
- Home Environment Appliances
- Home Organization, Laundry Care & Non-Electric Cleaning
- Home & Outdoor Décor
- Personal, Health & Garment Care
- Tableware, Serveware & Beverageware
