= International Home + Housewares Show =

Annual housewares show in Chicago, Illinois, U.S.

The Inspired Home Show
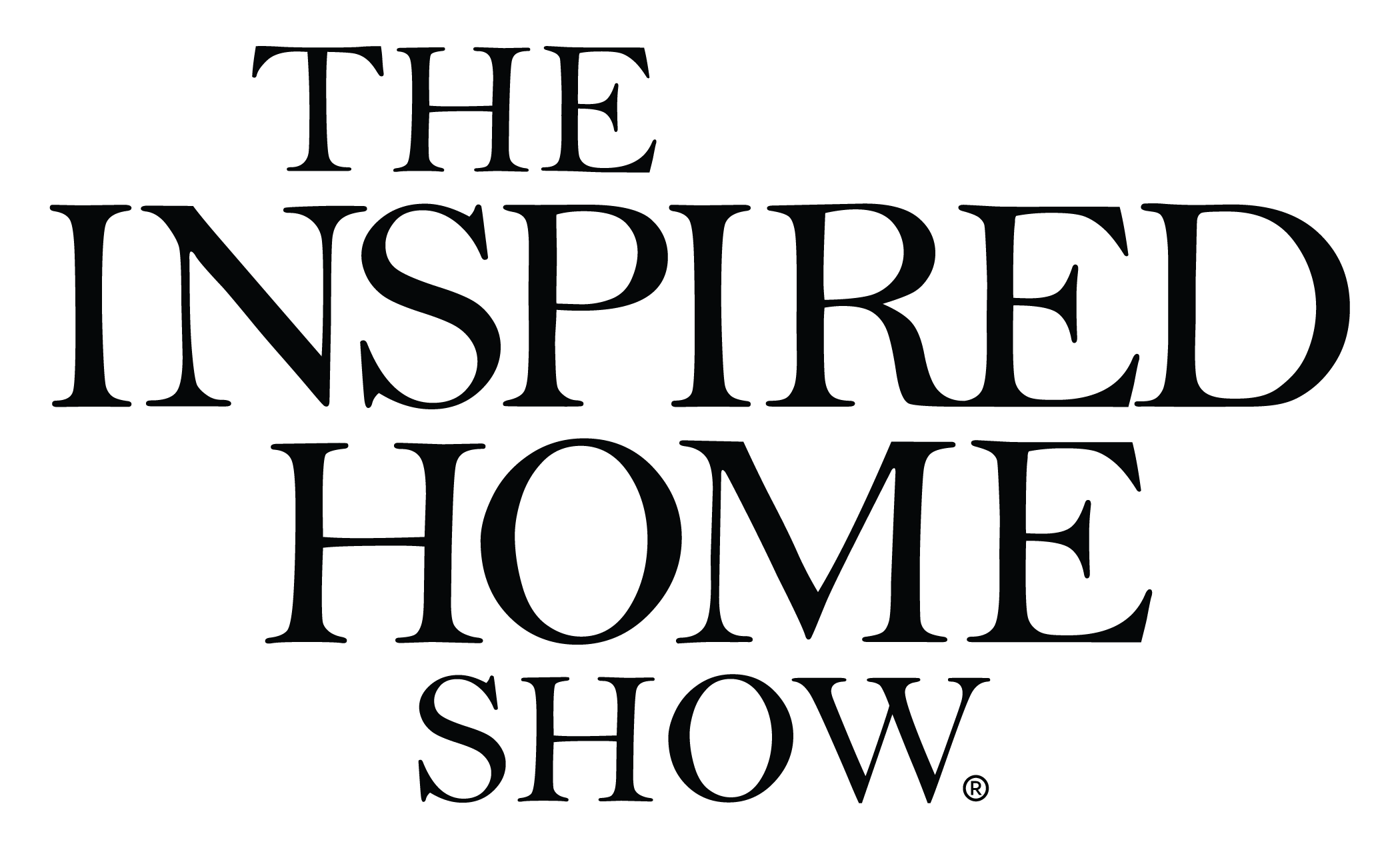
- Status: Active
- Genre: housewares
- Venue: McCormick Place
- Locations: Chicago, Illinois
- Country: United States
- Inaugurated: 1938
- Attendance: 60,000+
- Organizer: International Housewares Association
- Website: www.theinspiredhomeshow.com

The Inspired Home Show, formerly known as the International Home + Housewares Show, is an annual housewares show staged at McCormick Place in Chicago and organized by the International Housewares Association. In 2008, the Show covered 785,000 net square feet (72,900 m^{2}) of exhibit space. It is one of top 20 largest trade shows in the U.S. and in the top 10 in Chicago.

== History ==
"The first House Furnishing Goods Exhibition was held in New York’s Madison Square Garden in 1906. The modern housewares exposition was born in 1927 when members of the National Home Furnishings Buyers Club decided that an exhibit in centrally located Chicago would be the most efficient way to view the products of many manufacturers. The group convinced 115 manufacturers to display their wares at the Stevens (later renamed Conrad Hilton) Hotel on January 3–7, 1928, now known as the Hilton Chicago. The newly established National House Furnishing Manufacturers Association (NHFMA) responded to their buyers’ request for an annual exhibition, and for the next 10 years, shows including kitchenware and major appliances were held at the Stevens.

The International Housewares Association (IHA) was formed from multiple mergers among different organizations.

The National House Furnishing Manufacturers Association (NHFMA) joined with the House Furnishing Manufacturers Association of America (HFMAA) to create a single non-profit organization called the Housewares Manufacturers Association (HMA). In 1941, the new HMA put on its first show at the Palmer House. In 1946, the HMA and the New York Manufacturers Association merged to become the NHMA (National Housewares Manufacturers Association), the antecedent of IHA. The new NHMA signed the Philadelphia Convention Hall for its first joint exposition from April 27 – May 2, 1947, marking the end of the "hotel era" and moving into a true exhibition arena.

The Housewares Show grew swiftly after World War II ended. Exhibitors continually strained to expand their booth space, and would-be exhibitors battered at the doors. To accommodate the growing number of companies, the Show moved to Chicago's Navy Pier in 1949.

By 1949 the show was an international marketplace hosting buyers from 11 countries. The Show narrowed its product categories, terminating the major appliance segment and changing its name from the "National Housewares and Major Appliance Exhibit" to the "National Housewares and Home Appliance Manufacturers Exhibit" in 1950. The 1950 event saw a greater number of new products, although many manufacturers still had not invested in new tooling. The Show's primary importance was its abundance of personal contacts.

In 1956 no more than 649 exhibitors could fit into Navy Pier. The limitations could only be solved when the Show moved into Chicago's new exposition center, McCormick Place on the Lake, in 1961."

== New era on the lakefront ==
"More than 900 formerly 'squeezed' exhibitors happily stretched into the comfortable 310,000 square feet (29,000 m^{2}) of new space. Yet the grand facility was still too small for demand. The excitement brought 33,000 attendees to McCormick Place for opening day in 1961.

The Show bid farewell to Atlantic City and contracted for both semi-annual Shows in Chicago. The fortunes of the International Housewares Show were joined with McCormick Place for the next 36 years."

== The show that didn't happen ==
Late Sunday night, January 15, 1967, 1,236 exhibitors finished setting up their booths for the 13th Show at McCormick Place, fully expecting to meet 15,000 buyers the next morning on opening day. A fire destroyed the exhibition hall before the show could open, forcing the National Housewares Manufacturers Association (NHMA) to arrange a replacement event.

At 2 a.m., security guards detected a small fire; faulty electrical wiring had ignited storage materials in one exhibitor's booth on the upper-level main exhibit area. The flames spread rapidly through flammable exhibit walls and materials, and although firefighters responded within 10 minutes, the mammoth building's roof collapsed in less than one hour. By the time the fire was declared extinguished at 9:46 a.m., the exhibition hall had been destroyed. In dollar value, the fire was more costly than the Great Chicago Fire of 1871. One person died in the fire.

NHMA management convened at its Merchandise Mart office to organize a replacement show as quickly as possible. Sales materials that remained in hotel rooms and product samples collected from Merchandise Mart showrooms and department stores had to substitute for exhibits worth thousands of dollars.

Several other cities sought to host the trade show, but according to the account cited, Chicago was selected because of its hotel capacity and transportation infrastructure, which could accommodate the expected 60,000 visitors. Within a month, NHMA announced the Show would resume, at the International Amphitheatre on June 12–16."

== Era of change ==
"A new McCormick Place rose, and in January 1971, the 54th International Housewares Show was back at the exposition center. 700,000 square feet (65,000 m^{2}) replaced the former facility’s 480,000 square feet (45,000 m^{2}). In 1979, the West Building (Donnelley Hall) was pressed into service for new exhibitors with an extra day to attract buyers. McCormick Place’s new North building added 300,000 square feet (28,000 m^{2}) in 1986 to a Show that occupied three buildings.

In 1991, NHMA moved to new quarters in Rosemont near O'Hare Airport. The show changed its title several times, most notably from the “National Housewares Exposition” in the ‘80s to the “International Housewares Show” in 1992, when it became a single annual January Show in Chicago. In 1997, the International Housewares Show opened in the grand new South building of the McCormick Place complex. In 2004, IHA moved the trade show from its long-standing January date to a March timeframe and renamed it the International Home + Housewares Show in recognition of show's evolution to a homegoods marketplace."

== Notable product innovations ==
- 1876 — Melville Bissell patented a carpet sweeper, which he invented to alleviate his dust allergy.
- 1888 — Edward Katzinger, a tinsmith and mechanic, started the EKCO Housewares Company to make baking pans for commercial bakeries.
- 1910 — The Chicago Flexible Shaft Company (later known as The Sunbeam Co.) introduced an electric iron that proved heat, not weight, was the secret to better ironing.
- 1910 — Chester Beach's small motor powered a milkshake mixer for a Wisconsin dairy company. He partnered with L. H. Hamilton to form the Hamilton Beach Company.
- 1915 — Corning Glass Works developed a glass to withstand extreme temperatures for railroad signal lanterns—this led to PYREX ovenproof cookware.
- 1919 — Leo J. Wahl patented a hair clipper with the drive in the hand rather than connected to a separate motor. In 1967 the Wahl Clipper Corp. designed the cordless/rechargeable battery-operated hair trimmer.
- 1921 — General Mills created Betty Crocker to be an advisor to America's home cooks. Betty started the first radio cooking show in 1924.
- 1925 — The Waters Genter Company introduced an automatic, pop-up toaster and the Toastmaster brand. Packaged sliced bread appeared in 1930.
- 1928 — Manufacturer Col. Jacob Schick patented a men's electric shaver. The electric shaver market reached its first year of million-unit sales in 1936.
- 1930 — Sunbeam's Mixmaster entered in American kitchens. By 1936—despite the Depression— the company was selling 300,000 Mixmasters a year.
- 1937 — The Waring Blendor, a bartender's aid, premiered at the National Restaurant Show. It was named after Fred Waring, a popular band leader who financed the appliance's development.
- 1936 — The Homer Laughlin Company introduced Fiesta, brilliantly colored ceramic dinnerware. The classic forms continue, with many fresh colors added to the original five.
- 1938 — KitchenAid introduced a stand mixer designed by Egmont Arens. The stand mixer became the company's keystone product and its form a symbol for a product type.
- 1938 — Scientist Roy Plunkett accidentally invented the world's slipperiest substance. DuPont kept the material secret during World War II due to its use in the Manhattan Project, Teflon was revealed in 1946. Muffin tins were the first Teflon-coated cookware items.
- 1948 — Engineer/entrepreneur Lewis Salton invented an electrically heated tray to keep food warm at the dining table. His HoTray served buffet-style parties for decades.
- 1950 — Minnesota women asked H. David Dalquist for a fluted baking pan. Sales jumped after a cake made in Nordic Ware's Bundt pan won a Pillsbury baking contest in 1966.
- 1950 — The Proctor Electric Co. of Philadelphia added a steam attachment to its Never-Lift iron and introduced its Hi-Lo adjustable ironing board at the Atlantic City Housewares Show.
- 1953 — Electronics engineer Percy Spencer wondered why a candy bar melted in his pocked when he faced a military radar magnetron. His research led to the first microwave oven—the 750 lb., $3,000 Radarange.
- 1956 — Nicholas McKay invented The Lint Pic-Up when he forgot to dry clean his suit and used masking tape to remove lint from his tuxedo.
- 1956 — Ron Popeil demonstrated products at Woolworth's, but appeared on TV to pitch the Chop-O-Matic, and the infomercial was born.
- 1958 — Corning introduced Pyroceram, a ceramic-glass material that could endure heat and cold and was strong enough for space missile nose cones. Corning Ware cookware soon became a kitchen classic.
- 1962 — Target, Wal-Mart, Kmart and Crate & Barrel opened their doors to shoppers.
- 1966 — In Germany, Heinz Hankammer developed the AquaDeMat filter to desalinate water to use in car batteries. He made jug water filters for home tap water and named his new company, Brita, after his daughter.
- 1971 — Macy's West in San Francisco introduced its Cellar to showcase strong brands in a boutique merchandising concept for the emerging gourmet kitchenware business.
- 1971 — The Rival Company premiered the Crock-Pot, a 3 ½ quart unit with a ceramic liner that prepared economical, flavorful meals.T
- 1974 — In Denmark, 26-year-old Joergen Bodum joined his family's company and invited Carsten Jorgensen to head design. The Bistro French press coffee maker revealed their joint commitment.
- 1974 — The Uniform Grocery Product Code Council selected IBM to create a label and a scanner. At an Ohio supermarket, a pack of gum was the first UPC-marked item scanned at a retail checkout.
- 1976 — Noel and Adele Zeller made, marketed and sold products from the basement of their New York home. Their Zelco Industries produced the Itty Bitty Book Light.
- 1979 — Black & Decker applied the technology it created for the Apollo Moon landing to its Dustbuster.
- 1979 — While vacuuming, James Dyson became frustrated with his vacuum losing suction, so he re-engineered vacuum cleaner technology and launched his own design.
- 1990 — Sam Farber saw his wife struggle with common kitchen hand tools. He worked with Smart Design to put the Good Grips line into millions of hands.
- 1993 — The TV Food Network premiered, making cooking a spectator sport.
- 1994 — Salton, Inc. invited boxer George Foreman to represent its new grill, the George Foreman Lean Mean Fat-Reducing Grilling Machine.
- 1994 — Microplane crossed from the woodworking shop to the kitchen when a Canadian homemaker used one of the company's tools to grate an orange.
- 1994 — Jeff Bezos founded Amazon.com. In 1999, Time magazine named Bezos Person of the Year for his success in popularizing online shopping.
- 1999 — Procter & Gamble's Swiffer made its debut. The mop with the dirt-grabbing, disposable cloths created a new category of cleaning tools.
- 2001 — French chemist Guy Demarle pioneered silicone bakeware in Europe in the mid-1960s with the Silpat and Flexipan products. SiliconeZone introduced silicone bakeware, color and texture to U.S. kitchens.
- 2002 — The iRobot Corp., founded by Helen Greiner and partners to create military, industrial, and research robots, introduced the Roomba vacuuming robot and in 2005, the Scooba floorwashing robot.
