= McCormick Place =

Convention center in Chicago, Illinois

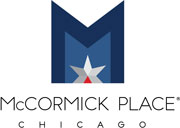
- Interactive map of McCormick Place
- Address: 2301 S. Lake Shore Drive
- Location: Chicago, Illinois
- Coordinates: 41°51′07″N 87°36′58″W
- Owner: MPEA
- Public transit: Green at Cermak–McCormick Place at McCormick Place

Construction
- Built: 1958
- Opened: November 1960; 66 years ago
- Expanded: 1986, 1996, 2007, 2017
- Cost: $2 billion

Website
- mccormickplace.com

McCormick Place is a convention center in Chicago. It is the largest convention center in North America. It consists of four interconnected buildings and one indoor arena sited on and near the shore of Lake Michigan, about 1.0 mi (1.6 km) south of the Chicago Loop. McCormick Place hosts numerous trade shows and meetings. The largest regular events are the Chicago Auto Show each February, the International Home and Housewares Show each March, the National Restaurant Association Annual Show each May, and the International Manufacturing Technology Show in the fall every other year.

== History ==
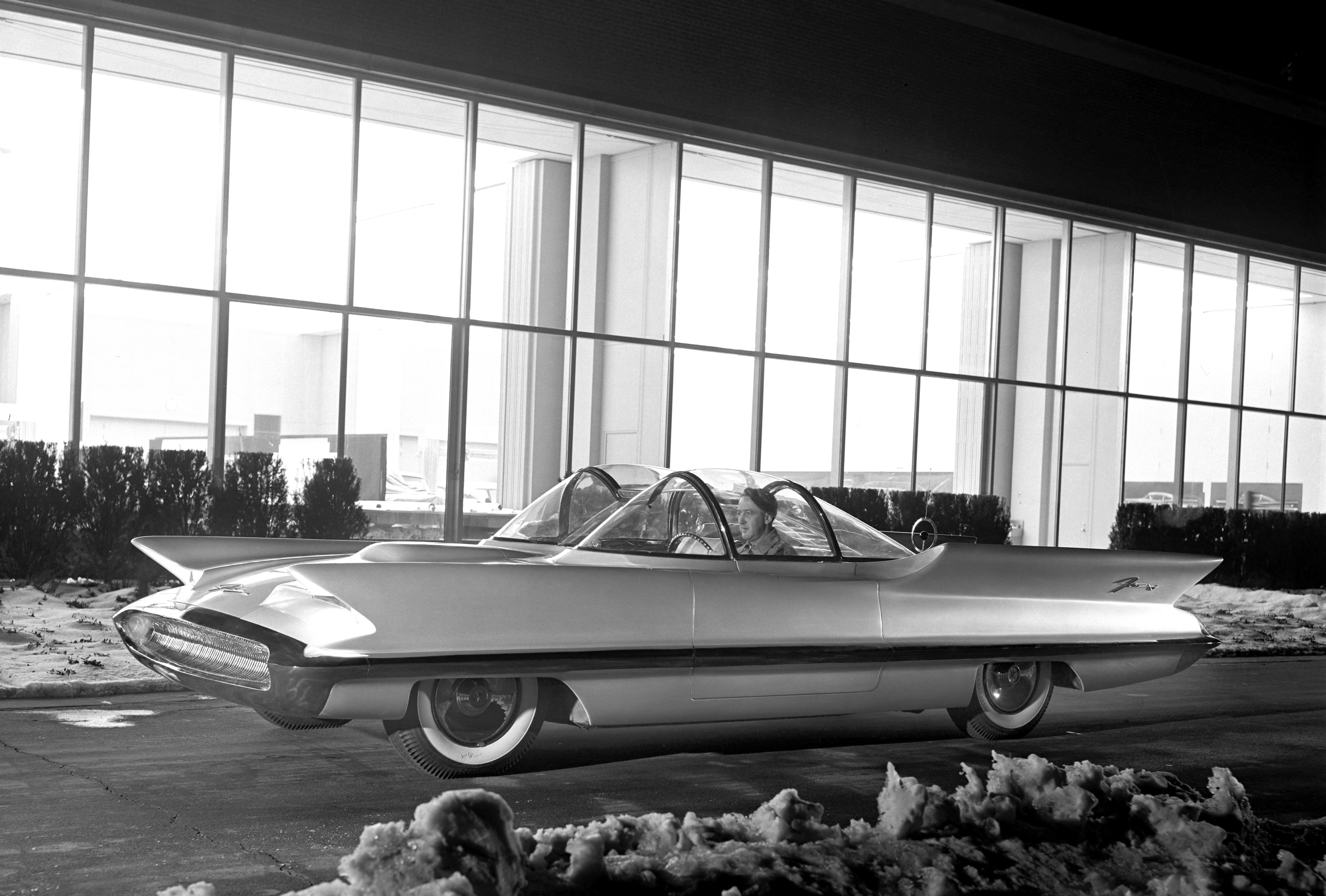
Lincoln Futura concept car parked in front of the original McCormick Place

As early as 1927, Robert R. McCormick, a prominent member of the McCormick family of McCormick Reaper/International Harvester fame, and publisher of the Chicago Tribune, championed a purpose-built lakeside convention center for Chicago. In 1958, ground was broken for a $35 million facility that opened in November 1960, and was named after McCormick, who died in 1955. The lead architect was Alfred Shaw, one of the architects of the Merchandise Mart. This building included the Arie Crown Theater, designed by Edward Durell Stone. It seated nearly 5,000 people and was the second largest theater (by seating capacity) in Chicago.

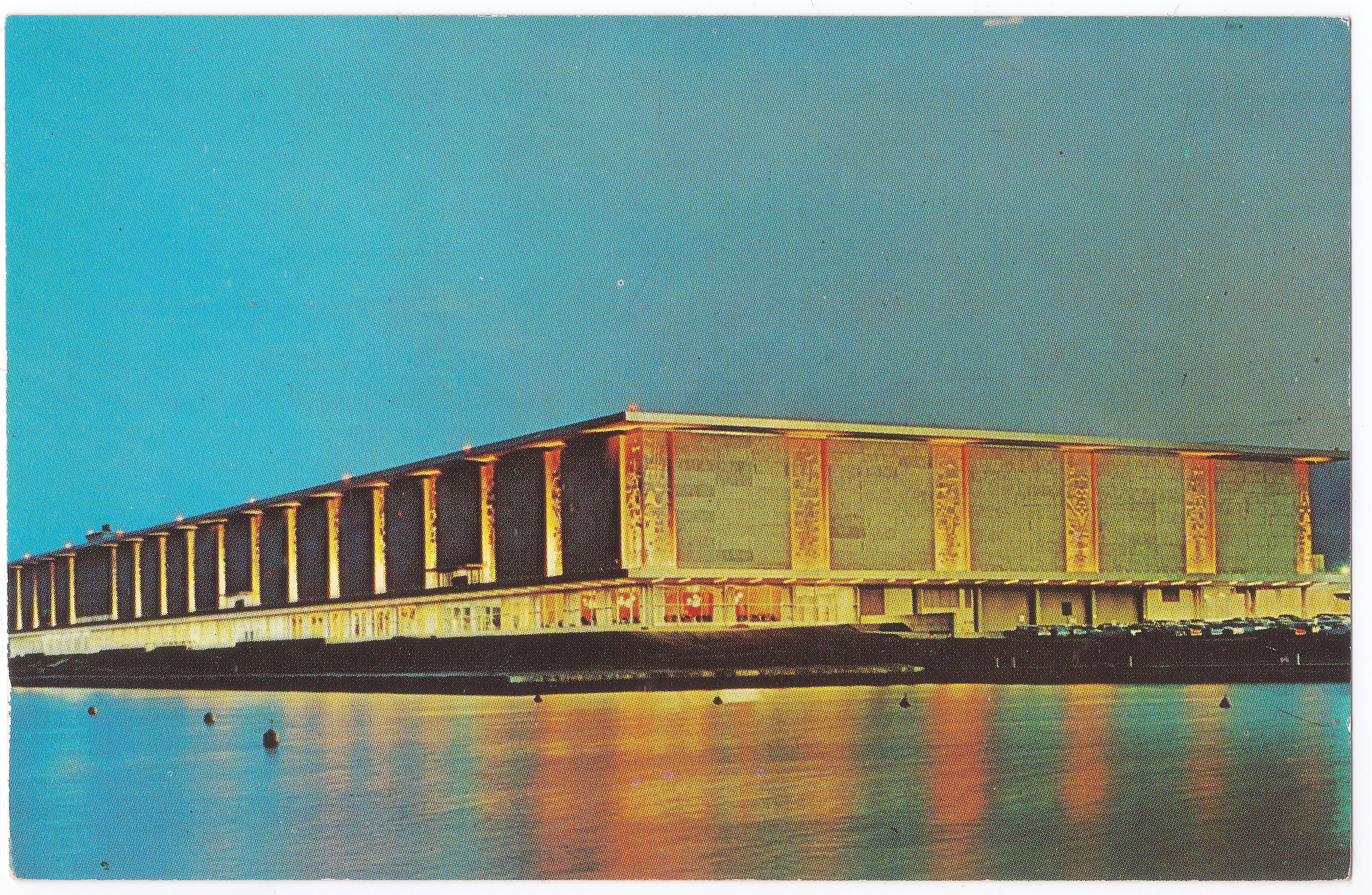
The original McCormick Place, completed in 1960, seen in 1966 from Lake Michigan before its destruction by fire in 1967

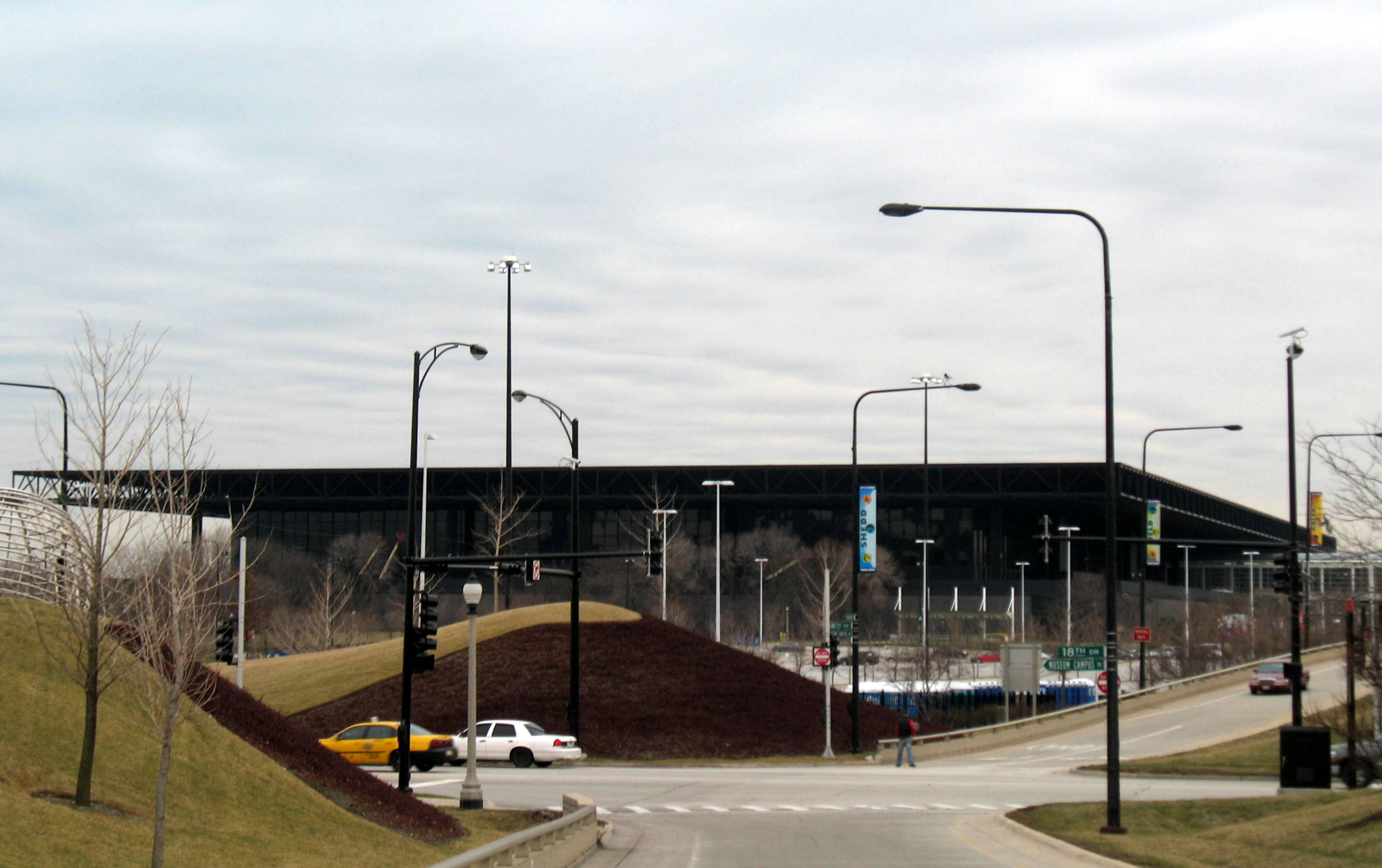
Lakeside Center looking south from Lake Shore Drive and 18th Street in 2007

The 1960 exposition hall was destroyed in a fire on January 16, 1967, despite being thought fireproof by virtue of its steel-and-concrete construction. At the time of the fire, the building contained highly combustible exhibits, several hydrants were shut off, and there were no sprinklers on the main floor where the fire started. Thus the fire spread quickly and destructively, taking the life of security guard Kenneth Goodman.

The fire was investigated by a team led by Rolf H. Jensen, Professor of Fire Protection Engineering at the Illinois Institute of Technology, who went on to found RJA Group. Many lessons were learned and building, electrical, and fire codes for the city and worldwide were amended.

Although many wanted to rebuild the hall on a different site, Chicago mayor Richard J. Daley chose to rebuild on the foundations of the burned building. The new design of dark steel and glass, by Gene Summers of C. F. Murphy and Associates (and formerly of Mies van der Rohe's office), contrasted with the white look of the structure that had burned. On January 3, 1971, the replacement building, later called the East Building and now called the Lakeside Center, opened with a 300,000 square feet (28,000 m^{2}) main exhibition hall. The Arie Crown Theatre sustained only minor damage in the 1967 fire, and so was incorporated into the interior of the new building. The theater, with the largest seating capacity of any active theater in Chicago (the Uptown Theatre has more seating, but is currently closed), underwent major modifications in 1997 to improve its acoustics.

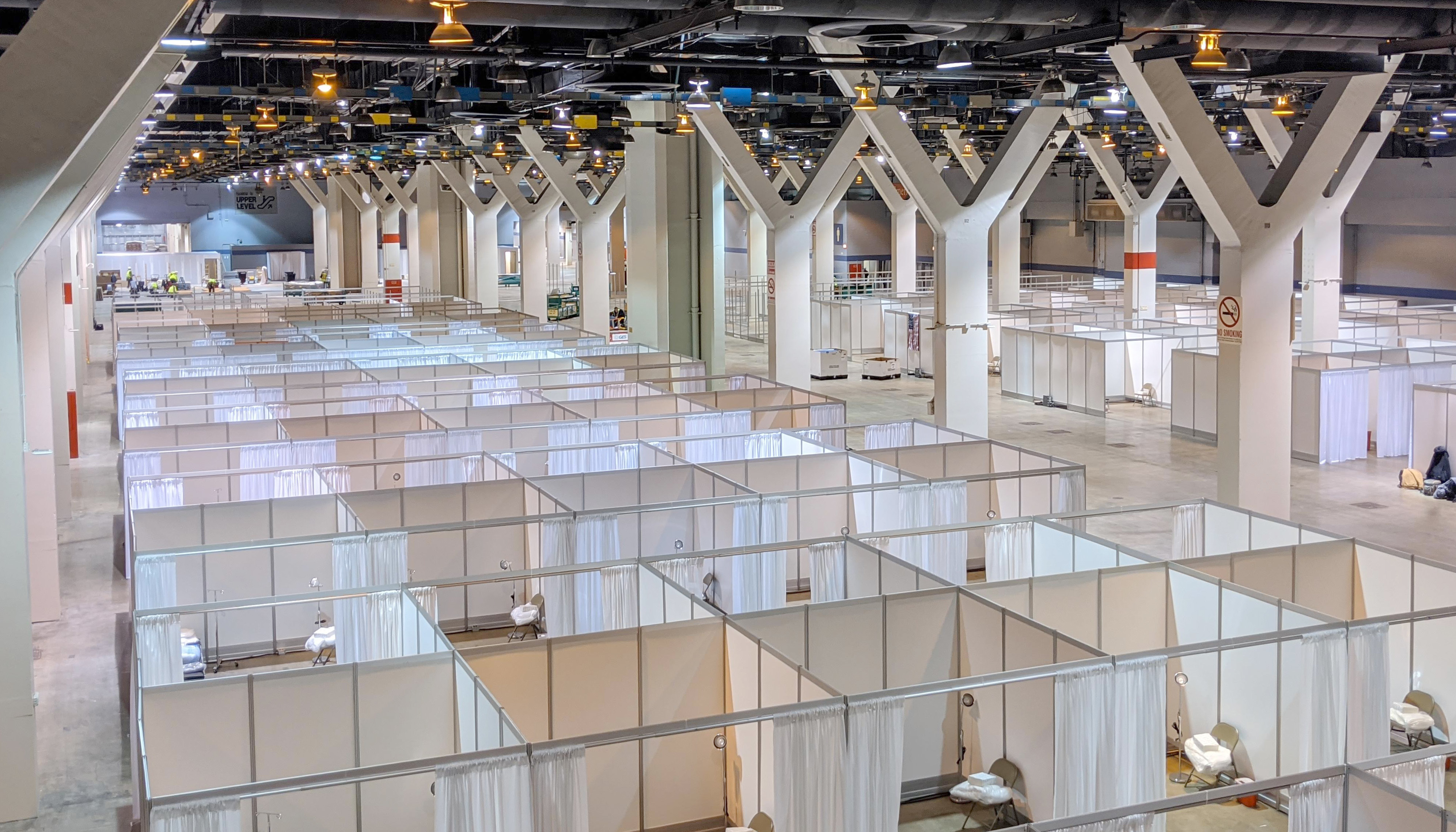
Parts of McCormick Place were transformed into a makeshift hospital during the COVID-19 pandemic.

On March 27, 2020, the United States Army Corps of Engineers announced that the complex would begin transforming convention space into a 3,000-bed hospital during the COVID-19 crisis. The $15 million project was paid for by FEMA and was scheduled for completion on April 30.

In 2021, it was proposed to turn Lakeside Center into a Rivers Casino, as part of the Chicago Casino Proposals.

The windows at McCormick Place Lakeside Center, which make up most of the building's exterior, encompass an area of 120,000 square feet (2.75 acres). In 2023, on a single night at the height of the fall bird migration, nearly 1,000 birds crashed into the building's windows and died. The following year, Lakeside Center spent $1.2 million and three months to apply arrays of small white dots, designed to be visible to birds, using adhesive film. An analysis showed that the number of birds colliding with windows at the building during the fall migration season dropped by more than 95%.

== Additions ==
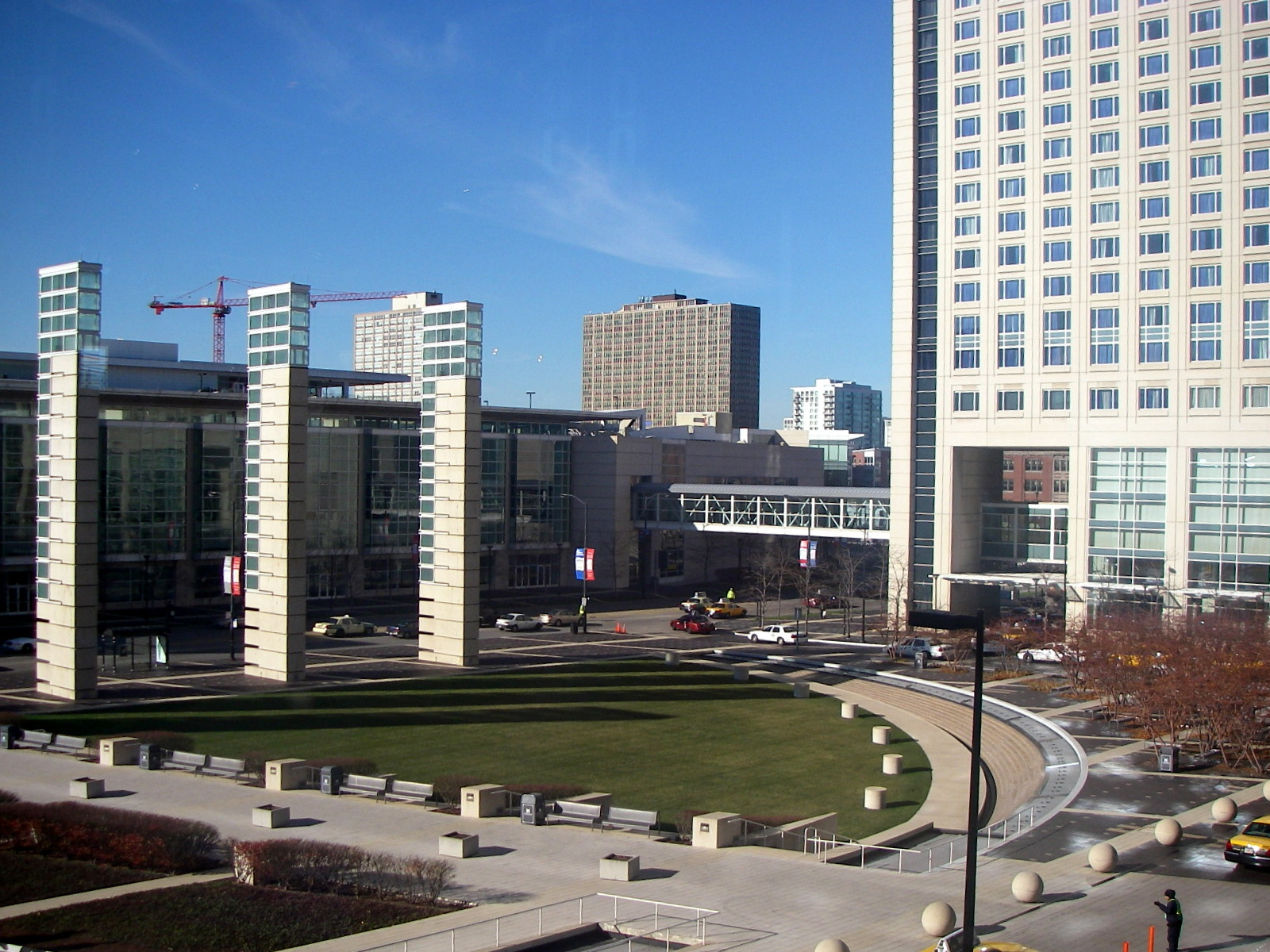
McCormick Square flanked by the West Building (left) and Hyatt Regency Hotel

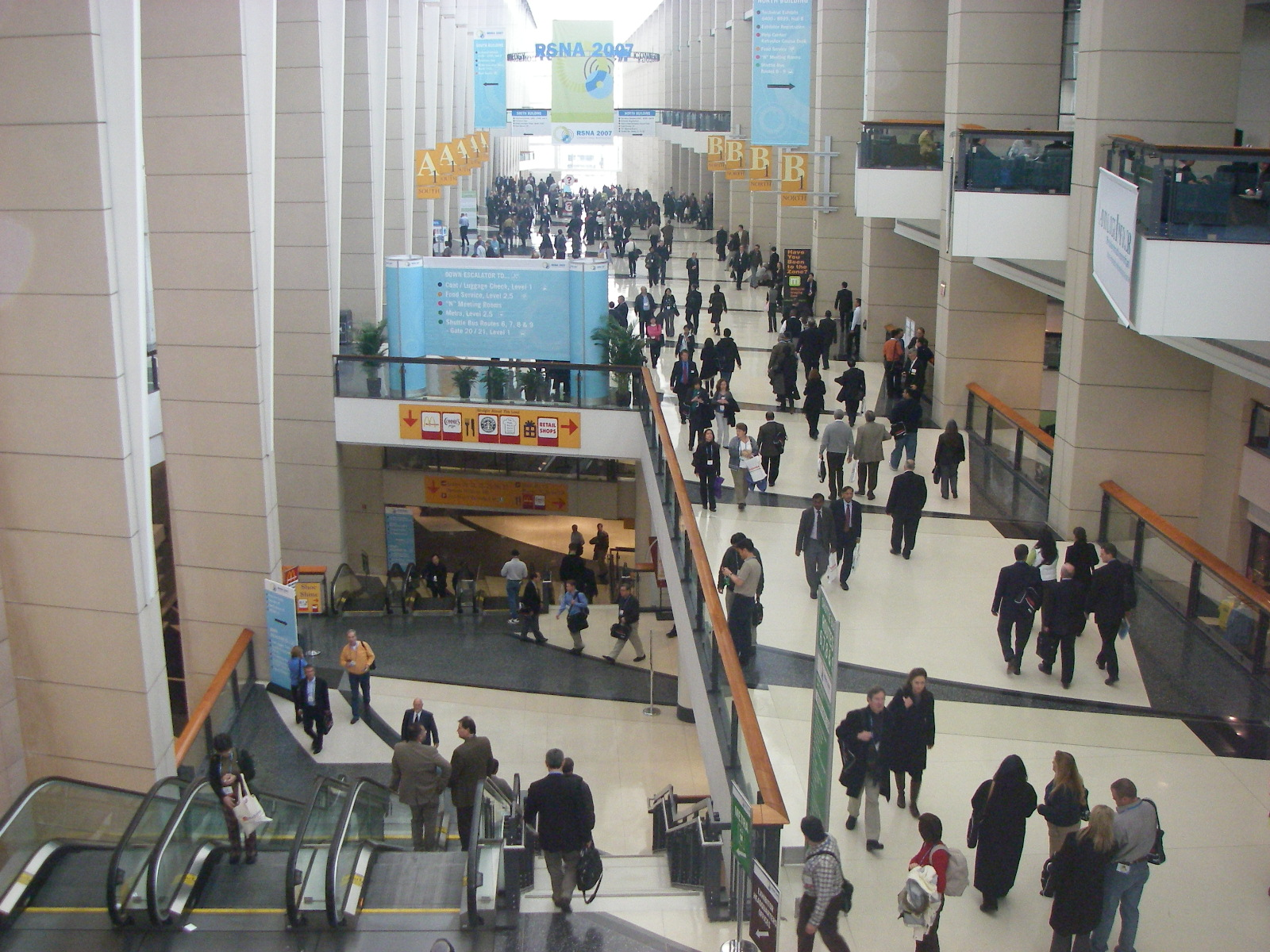
Grand concourse looking west in 2007

The North Building, located west of Lake Shore Drive and completed in 1986, is connected to the East Building by an enclosed pedestrian bridge. In contrast to the dark, flat profile of the East Building, the North Building is white (as the original building was), with twelve concrete pylons on the roof which support the roof using 72 cables. The HVAC system for the building is incorporated into the pylons and give the building the appearance of a rigged sailing ship. The North Building has approximately 600,000 sq ft (56,000 m^{2}) of main exhibition space.

The South Building, dedicated on December 12th, 1996, and designed by tvsdesign, contains more than 1 million sq ft (93,000 m^{2}) of exhibition space. It more than doubled the space in the complex and made McCormick Place the largest convention center in the nation. The South Building was built on the former site of the McCormick Inn, a 25-story, 619-room hotel built in 1973 as part of the McCormick City complex and demolished in 1993 when ground was broken for the South Building in May of that year.

On August 2, 2007, McCormick Place officials opened yet another addition to the complex, the West Building, also designed by tvsdesign and costing $882 million and completed eight months ahead of schedule. The publicly financed West Building contains 470,000 square feet (44,000 m^{2}) of exhibit space, bringing McCormick Place's total existing exhibition space to 2.67 million square feet (248,000 m^{2}). The West Building also has 250,000 square feet (23,000 m^{2}) of meeting space, including 61 meeting rooms, as well as a 100,000 square feet (9,300 m^{2}) ballroom, the size of a football field and one of the largest ballrooms in the world.

McCormick Place continued to expand in October 2017 with the opening of Wintrust Arena, a 10,387-seat arena situated on Cermak Road just north of the West Building. The new facility hosts DePaul Blue Demons men's and women's college basketball, and the WNBA's Chicago Sky. The new arena boasts 22 suites, 479 club seats, and 2 VIP lounges. The arena is also equipped to host concerts, sporting events, meetings, and conventions in conjunction with the rest of the McCormick Place complex. Sporting events such as gymnastics and volleyball are also held in the McCormick Place buildings in addition to the arena.

Archival materials are held by the Ryerson & Burnham Libraries at the Art Institute of Chicago. The McCormick Place on the Lake 1971 Collection includes photographs, drawings and project files documenting its construction.

South of the center is McCormick Place Bird Sanctuary, created in 2003. The northern end includes a recreated prairie, covering the roof of the center's underground carpark, and so requiring the use of shallow-rooted plants.

== Public transit ==
McCormick Place is served by the Chicago Transit Authority's bus and "L" (rapid transit) systems; by Metra, Chicago's commuter rail network; and by the South Shore Line, an interurban passenger rail service that runs between Chicago and South Bend, Indiana.

Metra Electric trains—which run between the Loop and points south—stop at an eponymous station underneath McCormick Place. South Shore trains also stop here, but only during special events, and will not board northbound nor discharge southbound passengers due to a non-compete agreement with Metra.

At the street level, CTA's no. 3 and no. 21 bus routes—which run north-south and east-west through the South and Southwest Sides, respectively—serve McCormick directly. Cermak–McCormick Place, a station on the "L"'s Green Line, lies two blocks west of the convention center's westernmost entrance.

=== Busway ===
The McCormick Place Busway runs 2.5 miles (4.0 km) from Lower Randolph between Michigan and Columbus in downtown Chicago to the center. It uses the lower levels of the multilevel streets near downtown, and surface streets to follow the Metra Electric District right-of-way to outside the South Building of McCormick Place. Opened in 2002 at a cost of $43 million, it is meant to provide an unencumbered expressway for visitors to move between downtown hotels and the convention center, but is also used by buses for Soldier Field events, public safety workers, Metra, convention contractors, and Art Institute deliveries. It is also used by national and international government officials as a secure route. It is also known as the "Mayor's Road" (as it runs to Maggie Daley Park, named after mayor Richard M. Daley's wife), the "Bat Cave", the "Magic Road" and a "secret road". Its use is administered by the Chicago OEMC (Office of Emergency Management and Communications), and regular users are granted access cards. The convention center advertises the road as a benefit to potential customers.

== Gallery ==
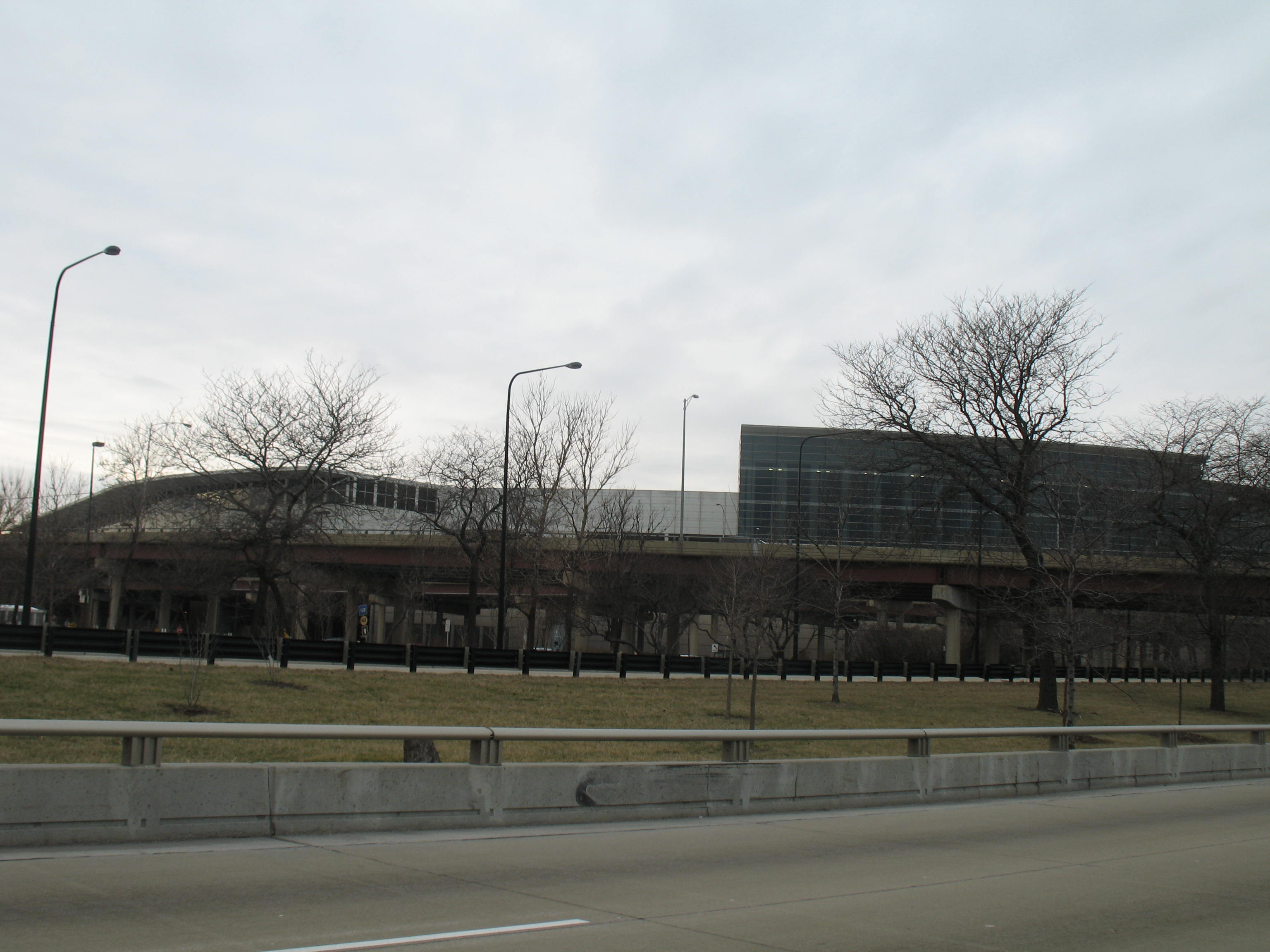
South Building from Lake Shore Drive looking northwest in 2007

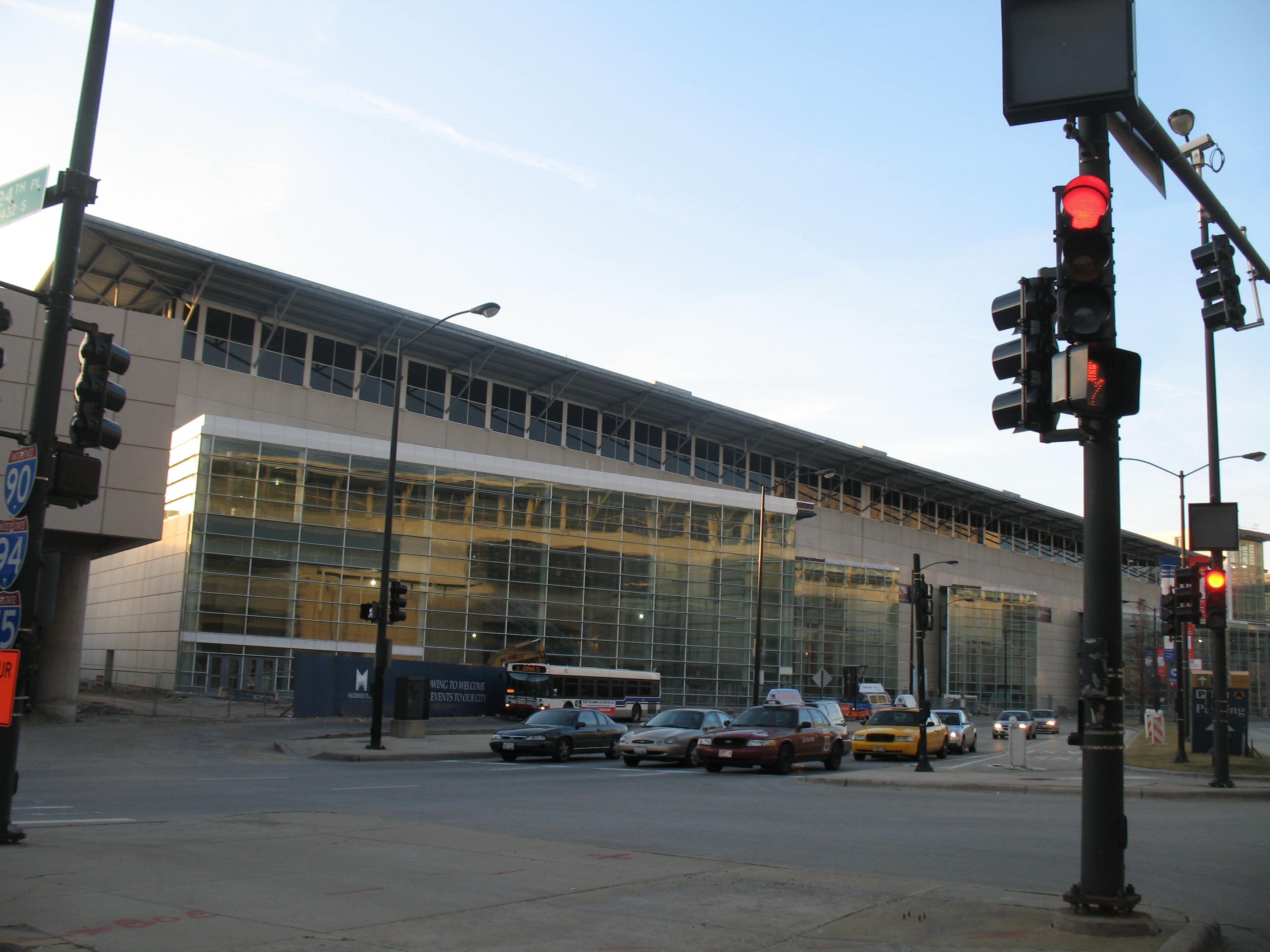
West Building looking northwest from King Drive and 24th Place in 2007

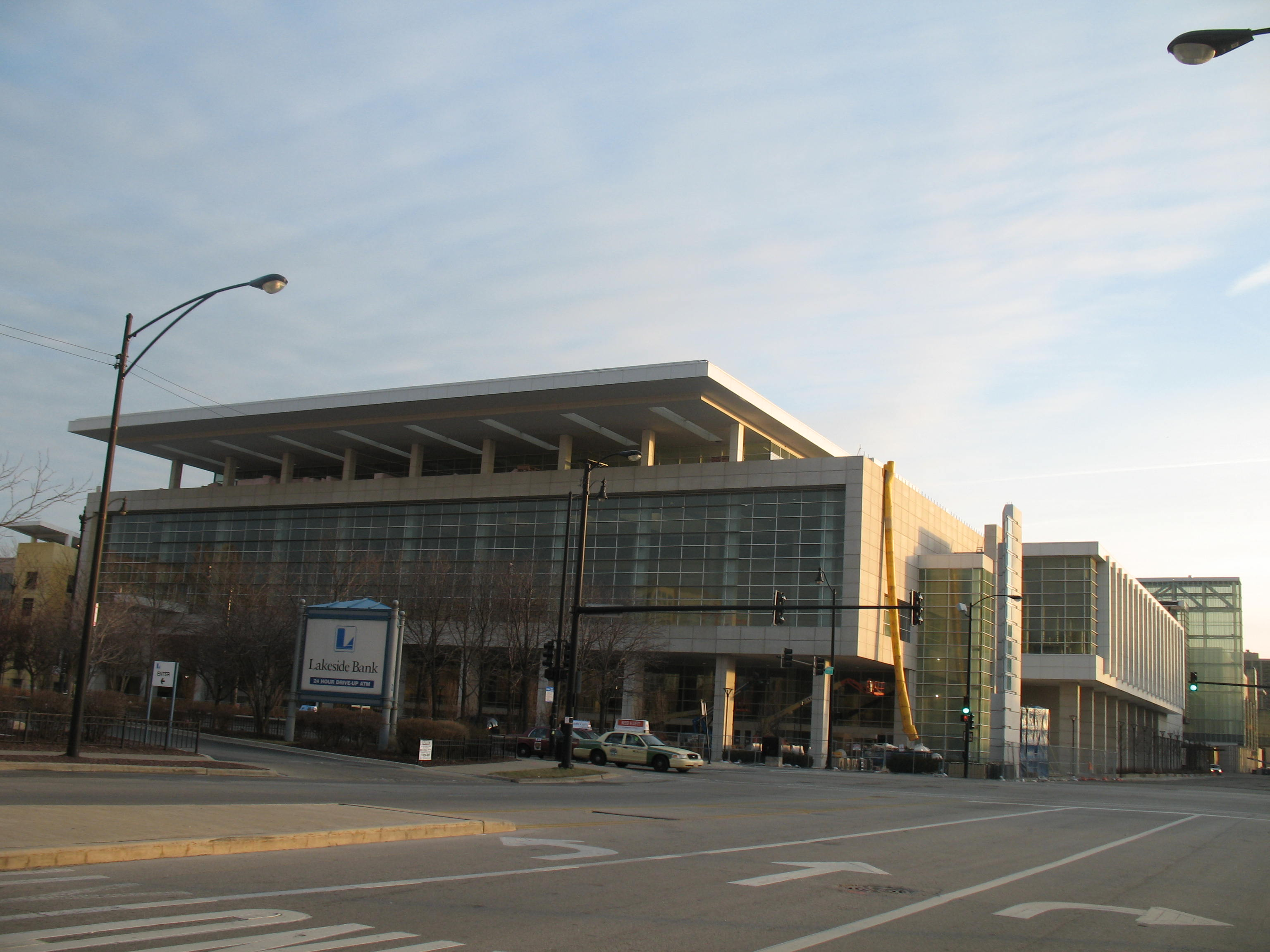
West Building looking southeast from Indiana and Cermak (22nd St) in 2007

== See also ==
- Metropolitan Pier and Exposition Authority
- List of convention centers in the United States
