= Rapp Bomek =

Norwegian engineering company in Bodø

- Formerly: A/S Motoren Rap; Rapp Motorfabrikk; Rapp Hydema
- Company type: Aksjeselskap
- Industry: Mechanical engineering
- Founded: 1907
- Headquarters: Bodø, Norway
- Key people: Ferdinand Münz; Kurt-Are Kristoffersen (managing director)
- Products: Fire and safety doors and hatches for ships and offshore; formerly marine engines and deck machinery

Rapp Bomek is a mechanical engineering company in Bodø that supplies, in particular, fire and safety doors and hatches for ships and offshore use, as well as various other safety solutions and systems. Rapp Bomek has roots in Motoren Rap, started in Oslo in 1907, and Bodø Mekaniske Verksted.

== History ==
A/S Motoren Rap was started in 1907 to produce a small boat engine that the Swiss engineer Ferdinand Münz (1864–1939) had designed after becoming taken with engines at a motor exhibition in Gothenburg. He was actually employed at a weaving mill, Claes Johansson & Co, run by the family of Fred. Olsen's son-in-law Knut Olaf Mark (born 1873), which opened the way to financing the venture. The share capital was 15,000 kroner at the start, and the company's first board was led by J. W. Johannessen, who was Fred. Olsen's ship inspector; probably both he and Olsen were shareholders from the start. Production began in rented premises that had housed a stonemasonry at Rodeløkken in Oslo, and Münz moved to Oslo with his family and led the technical operation until he stepped down in 1922.

The first model of the Rap was a four-stroke hot-tube engine of 6 to 8 horsepower, of which three were produced. One was used by the boatbuilder Holm at Lindøya and is today at the Norwegian Museum of Technology. The big breakthrough came with a two-stroke hot-bulb engine that won recognition at the Bergen exhibition of 1907 and secured loyal customers first on the Helgeland coast and at Hvaler, and later along the whole coast. The engines were paraffin-driven, fitted with a variable-pitch propeller, and came in various sizes up to 22 hp, and Münz made a number of inventions and improvements that could also be fitted to old engines, so that the Rap became a popular engine regarded as a good and long-term investment.

=== New factory in Malmøgata ===
The engineer Anton I. Sletten was hired as manager in 1910 and led the company until 1934. He had experience from motor factories in the United States and brought ideas of efficient assembly-line production. The rented plant in Malmøgata and a neighboring site were bought, and a new factory was designed by the architect Just Borthen and built in 1915–1916. The First World War had brought a large increase in demand for fish, and thus a basis for more fishermen to acquire engines, and turnover increased greatly. Workers' wages rose, and an eight-hour working day and holiday arrangements were introduced from 1919.

The setbacks in the fisheries and general economy of the 1920s led to a halt in production and the dismissal of all workers. This turned after 1925, through new engine improvements made partly in cooperation with the Norwegian Institute of Technology (NTH) in Trondheim and through aggressive sales efforts, including having the motor cutter Rapmotoren built to run along the coast as an advertising boat; it also sailed to the Faroe Islands and Iceland to promote Norwegian motor industry.

In 1933 A/S Motoren Rapp, as it was called after 1931, merged with the neighboring company at Rodeløkken, A. Gulowsens Motorfabrikk, which had run into liquidity difficulties. Rapp took over the working drawings and over 100 finished and half-finished engines of the Grei brand, which Gulowsen had produced under license from the Danish Alpha.

=== Secret weapons factory ===
During the Second World War, the mass-production expertise was used for secret weapons production at night for the home front. Bror With was responsible for producing over 100 copies of the British submachine gun, the Sten gun. The parts were produced in various places without the different producers learning what the parts were to become, and at night Rapp's premises were used to assemble the parts and test-fire the weapons in the basement.

=== To Bodø with regional development funds ===
In 1957–1958 the engine factory moved to Bodø. One reason for the move was that a large part of the market for smaller motor vessels was located in northern Norway, and another was a shortage of skilled workers in Oslo. The most important reason, however, was that the Regional Development Fund (DU) at this time launched several incentives that made it profitable for companies in central areas to move to northern Norway or other regions needing state assistance for industrial development. The DU had also taken its own initiative to establish a motor factory in northern Norway, since such a thing was lacking in a region with a great need for ship engines as well as industrial growth, and a new motor factory at Burøya by Bodø harbor, the move of production equipment, and housing for the employees received very favorable state financing.

The last engine at the old factory in Oslo was produced in November 1958, with building number 5551. The Oslo operation nonetheless continued with license production and sale of the power block that the Seattle company Marine Construction (MARCO) had developed. The power block came to have great importance in the fishing fleet and sold in large numbers in Norway and Iceland through the 1960s, giving a new golden age for the Oslo company.

At the same time, the motor factory in Bodø struggled with profitability, as the focus on larger engine types and license-produced diesel engines from Czechoslovakia, among other places, had not paid off. The solution, set as a condition by the DU and the state banks for writing off debt and giving new support, was to gather all of Rapp in Bodø, that is, to move the profitable power-block operation too. The move was completed in 1964. All the workers in Oslo were given employment together at Thune-Eureka at Skøyen, while a group of engineers and fitters who had worked with refrigeration technology at Rapp were transferred to Aanonsen at Hasle. The factory in Malmøgata was sold to the neighbor, the chocolate factory Bergene.

Shortly after, the last Rapp engine was produced. Hot-bulb and semi-diesel engines had been outcompeted by small and light but powerful diesel engines, and the Rapp became a nostalgic sound along the coast that can still be heard in some preserved veteran vessels and at museums along the coast. The factory in Bodø continued to specialize in power blocks and other deck equipment for the fishing fleet.

=== Mergers ===
In 1970 a merger was negotiated with the neighboring company Bodø Mekaniske Verksted, Bomek. This company was a continuation of Bodø Skipsverft & Mek. Verksted, started in 1868, which had gone bankrupt in 1964. The DU, which had interests in both companies, said no to the merger, however, and instead Rapp merged in 1977 with Fish & Ships Gear in Gressvik near Fredrikstad, which had the same type of products and customers. The two companies had already cooperated, including by establishing a joint company in Scotland in 1970, Fishing Hydraulics, and the new company was named Rapp Hydema, from "hydraulisk dekksmaskineri" (hydraulic deck machinery).

The neighboring company Bomek went bankrupt in 1982 after losses on large offshore deliveries. Rapp Hydema came in as an owner together with Nordlandsbanken, and the workshop cluster at Burøya was carried on as the sister companies Rapp Bomek and Rapp Hydema. The Østfold division was continued as Hydema Sør, became a separate company again in 2015, and moved to Moss in 2018. Rapp Bomek specialized in fire doors, which had been the most profitable niche product since it won its first contracts on the Statfjord field in 1978, and Rapp had also expanded by acquiring a fire-door factory at Kapp on Toten in 1996. This had been started by Raufoss Ammunisjonsfabrikk in 1972 and gained local owners at Kapp in 1986.

== Bibliography ==
- Røsholm, Halvor E. (1982). Rapp 75 år. Fra Rodeløkka til Bodø. Rapps historie 1907–1982.
