= Anova (disambiguation) =

In statistics, ANOVA (analysis of variance) is a test that compares the means of multiple groups.

Anova or ANOVA may also refer to:

- Renewal–Nationalist Brotherhood (Galician: ANOVA–Irmandade Nacionalista), a political party in Galicia
- Anova Culinary, an American kitchen appliance company
- Anova Music, an Israeli independent record label
- Acera School (formerly Anova School), an elementary school in Winchester, Massachusetts, United States
- NOVA2 (or ANOVA), a protein
- Pavilion Books (formerly Anova Books), an imprint of HarperCollins
