= Ankarsrum =

- Location within Kalmar Location within Sweden
- Coordinates: 57°41′N 16°19′E
- Country: Sweden
- Province: Småland
- County: Kalmar County
- Municipality: Västervik Municipality

Area
  - Total: 1.66 km^{2} (0.64 sq mi)

Population (31 December 2010)
  - Total: 1,254
  - Density: 756/km^{2} (1,960/sq mi)
- Time zone: UTC+1 (CET)
  - Summer (DST): UTC+2 (CEST)

Ankarsrum is a locality situated in Västervik Municipality, Kalmar County, Sweden with 1,254 inhabitants in 2010.

== History ==
There is written evidence for Ankarsrum dating to about 1430 (when it was called Jangolsrwme) and from 1544 (Ångersrum).

In 1655, the Ankarsrums bruk ironworks was founded in the town. Originally known for manufacturing, among other things, cast iron kitchen stoves and bathtubs, the company was acquired by Electrolux in 1969 who then moved the Assistent production line from Motala to here.

== Access ==
Ankarsrum can be accessed via Swedish national road 40. In addition, Ankarsum has a preserved station building on the Hultsfred – Västervik narrow-gauge railway which is operated during the summer.
