= Jobu =

Jobu may refer to:

- Jo-Bu, a Norwegian chainsaw manufacturer
- Jobu Formation, a Cretaceous geologic formation of Late Cenomanian age
- Jobu University, a private university in Isesaki, Gunma, Japan
- Jobu Morita (born 1980), Japanese baseball utility player

== Fictional characters ==
- Jobu, a voodoo doll in the film Major League
- Jobu Tupaki, antagonist in the film Everything Everywhere All at Once
