= Electrolux Ankarsrum Assistent =

Stand mixer introduced by Electrolux in 1940

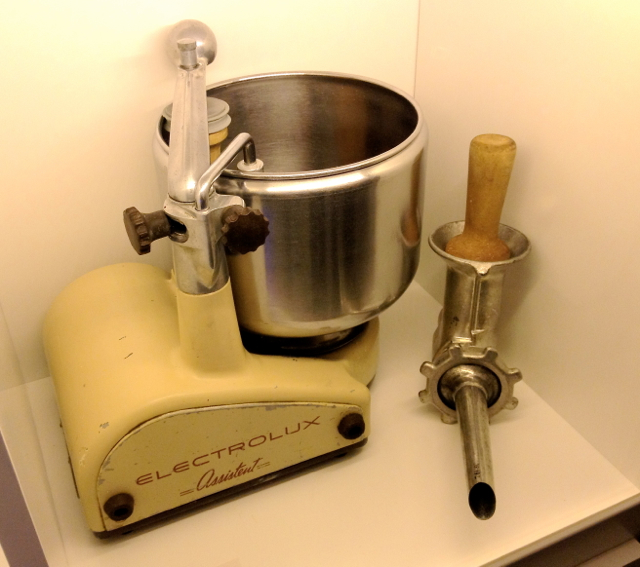
A 1940s model Electrolux Assistent N1 model exhibited at the Museum of Technology in Stockholm.

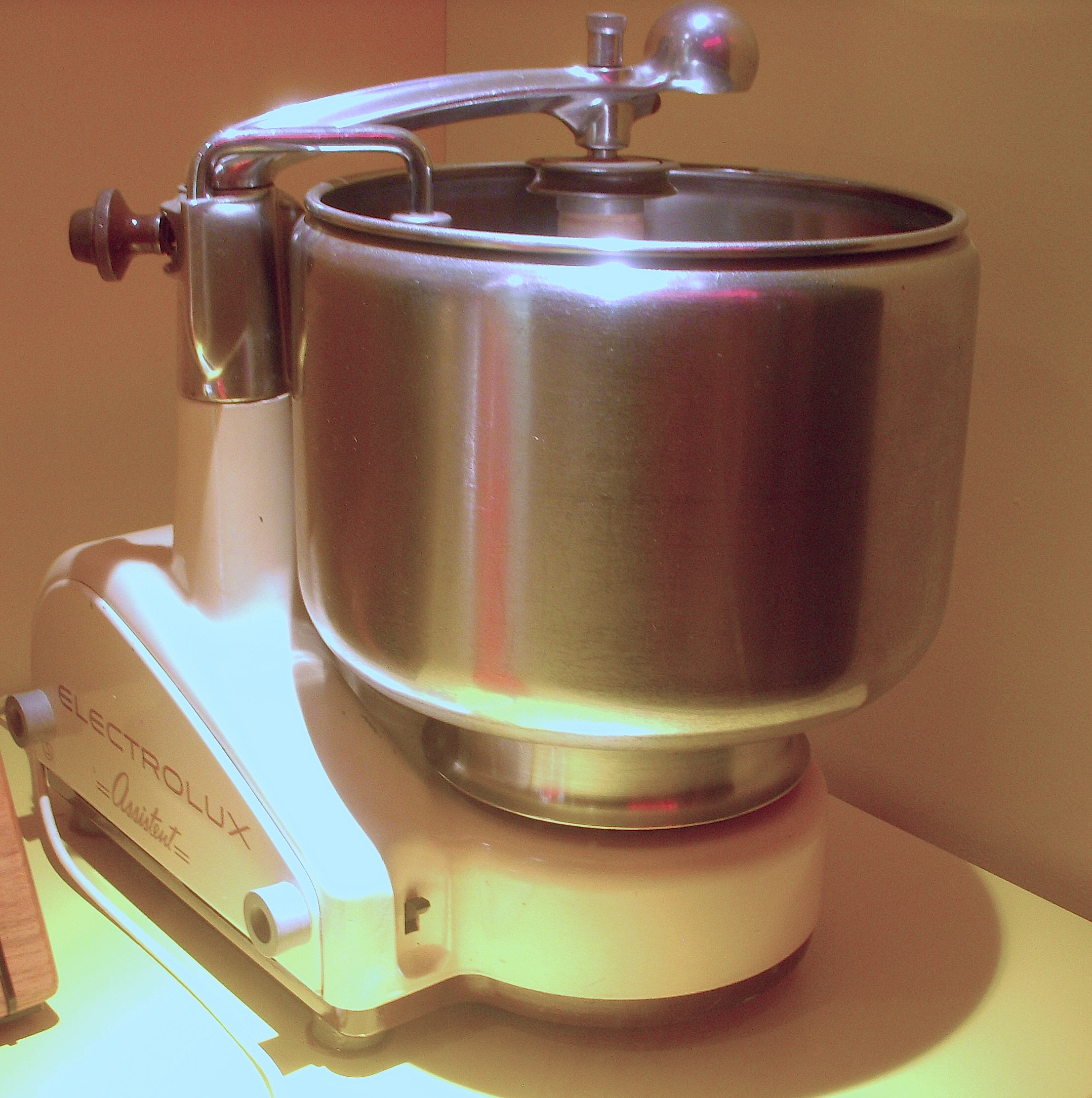
A c. 1950s N3 model on display at the Nationalmuseum, Stockholm, Sweden.

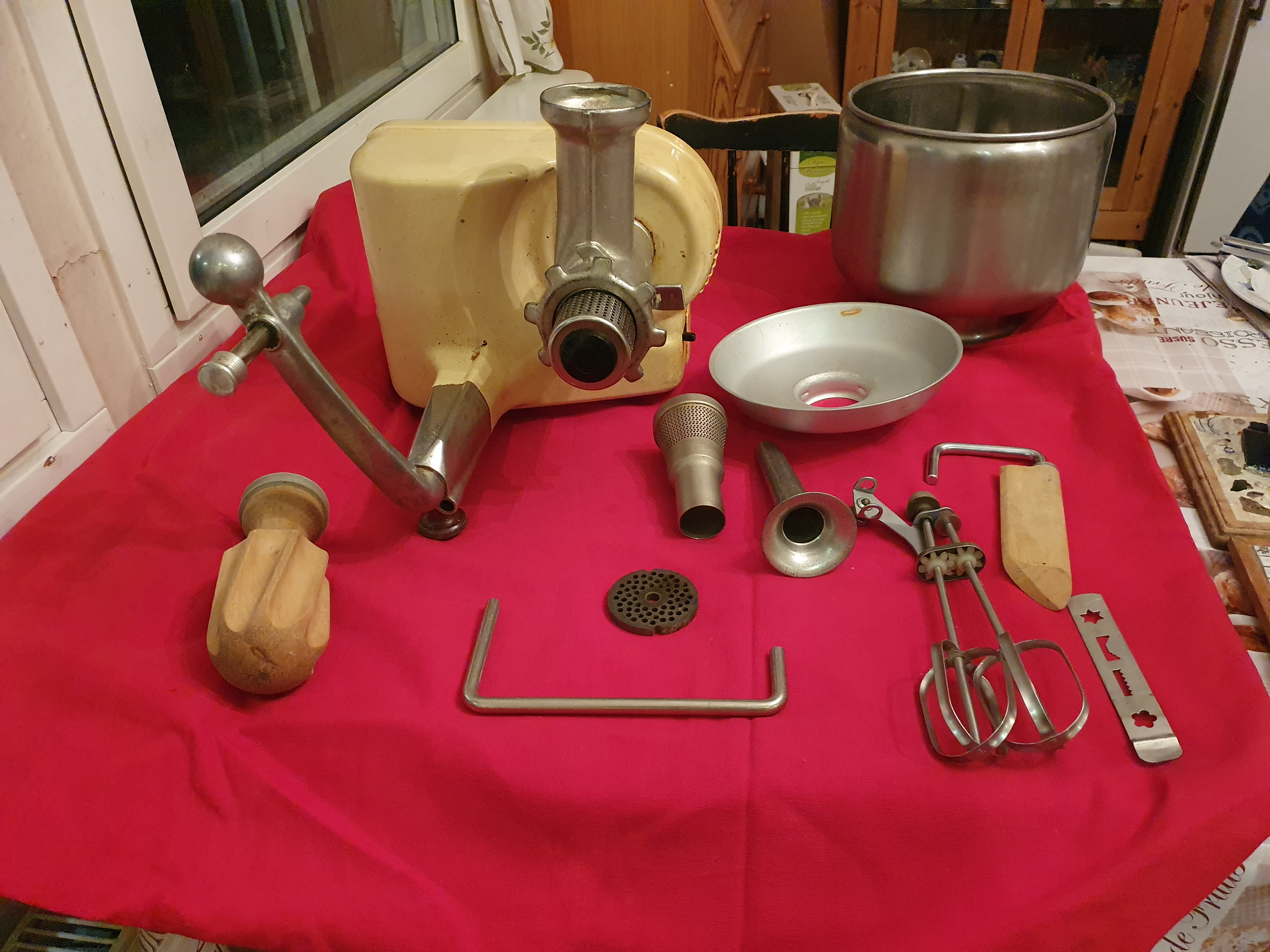
N3 model with accessories.

Assistent is a stand mixer, a type of household kitchen appliance, introduced by Electrolux in 1940.

The distinctive feature of this mixer is that it spins the bowl and its contents rather than the stirring paddle. As a result, there is more torque and less noise.

== History ==
It was designed by Alvar Lenning (1897–1980) and became a bestseller for Electrolux.

The first Assistent had the model number NG1, and featured a 250 watt motor. A wartime recipe collection was also included in each box. In 1945, the second model, number N1 was introduced, although post-war material shortages meant that deliveries took as long as three years.

Around 1950–51, model N3 was introduced with several improvements, including a switch from wood to plastic for the roller and paddle, and a motor upgrade to 275 watts. This was followed by model N4 in 1954 which featured a new mixer socket design. Until 1962, the Assistent was produced at Lilla Essingen in Stockholm, when the production line was then moved to Motala.

Since 1969, the Assistent has been produced in Ankarsrum when Electrolux acquired the metallurgy firm Ankarsrums bruk and moved the production line to there from Motala. Originally produced in a crème colour, it eventually became available in a variety of colours.

Electrolux subsequently sold the Assistent appliance line to the investment company Traction AB in 2001, and in 2009 the now-renamed Ankarsrum Industries AB took over all rights to produce, market and sell the Assistent, but still sharing the rights to use the name "Assistent" with Electrolux.

== Use ==
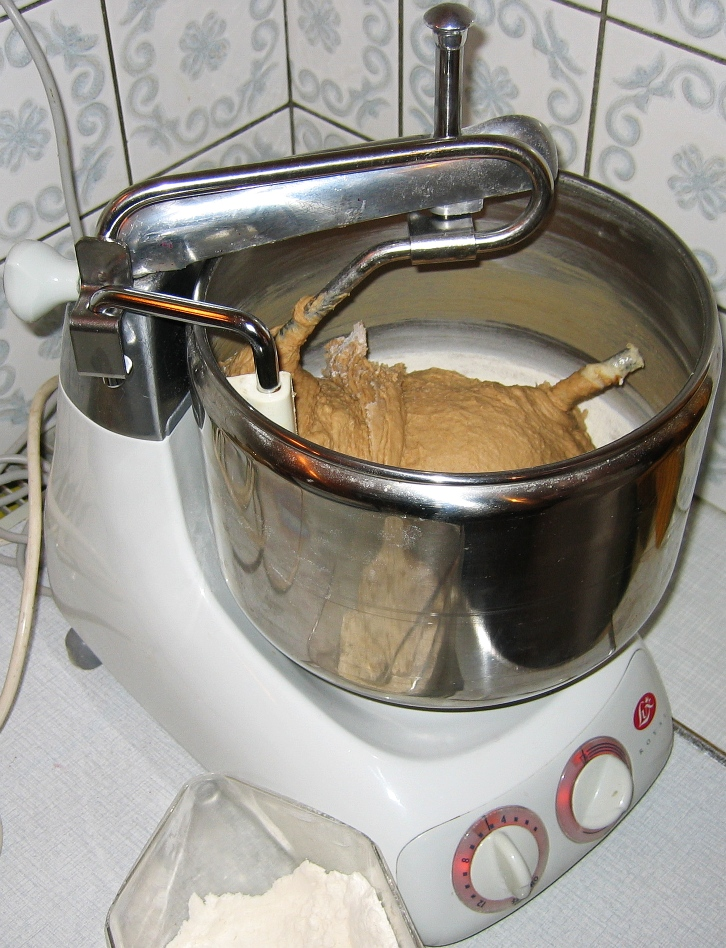
Example of a bread hook being used, in an Assistent of approximately mid-to-late-1990s vintage.

The most distinctive feature of the mixer is that it spins the bowl and its contents while the attachments remain stationary, unlike "planetary" mixers such as the KitchenAid, which moves the attachments around the center of the stationary bowl. As a result, there is more torque, less noise, less tendency for the mixer to "walk", or move across the counter.

Other differences include the dough knife, which guides the contents away from the sides and toward the dough hook or dough roller, means the mixer does not need to be stopped to allow scraping. The bowl turning instead of the attachments spinning means there is less risk of a spatula or fingers becoming caught. The lack of a large motor over the bowl means ingredients can be added more easily.

The motor is also more powerful than those in planetary home mixers. The bowl is driven by an electric motor and worm gear from beneath. The power of the motor has increased over time from 250 W to 400 W, 450 W, 650 W, 800 W and finally to 1500 W; the motors of other high-end stand mixers generally are less than half as powerful. Original machines had a simple single speed switch; modern machines have both variable speed and a timer.

Unlike what is called for in most US recipes, liquid ingredients are added to the bowl first, and then the dry ingredients are added to the wet.

== Reviews ==
According to Wired, the Assistent excels with bread dough but is "not for the inexperienced" and "should not be anyone's first" stand mixer, though "it might just be the last mixer you ever buy". Homes and Gardens wrote that for serious breadmakers "this is a must-have mixer". Epicurious called it "a superior bread-mixing mixing machine" and said "It very well could be the only mixer you’d ever need to own, especially given its reputation for reliability."

== Accessories ==
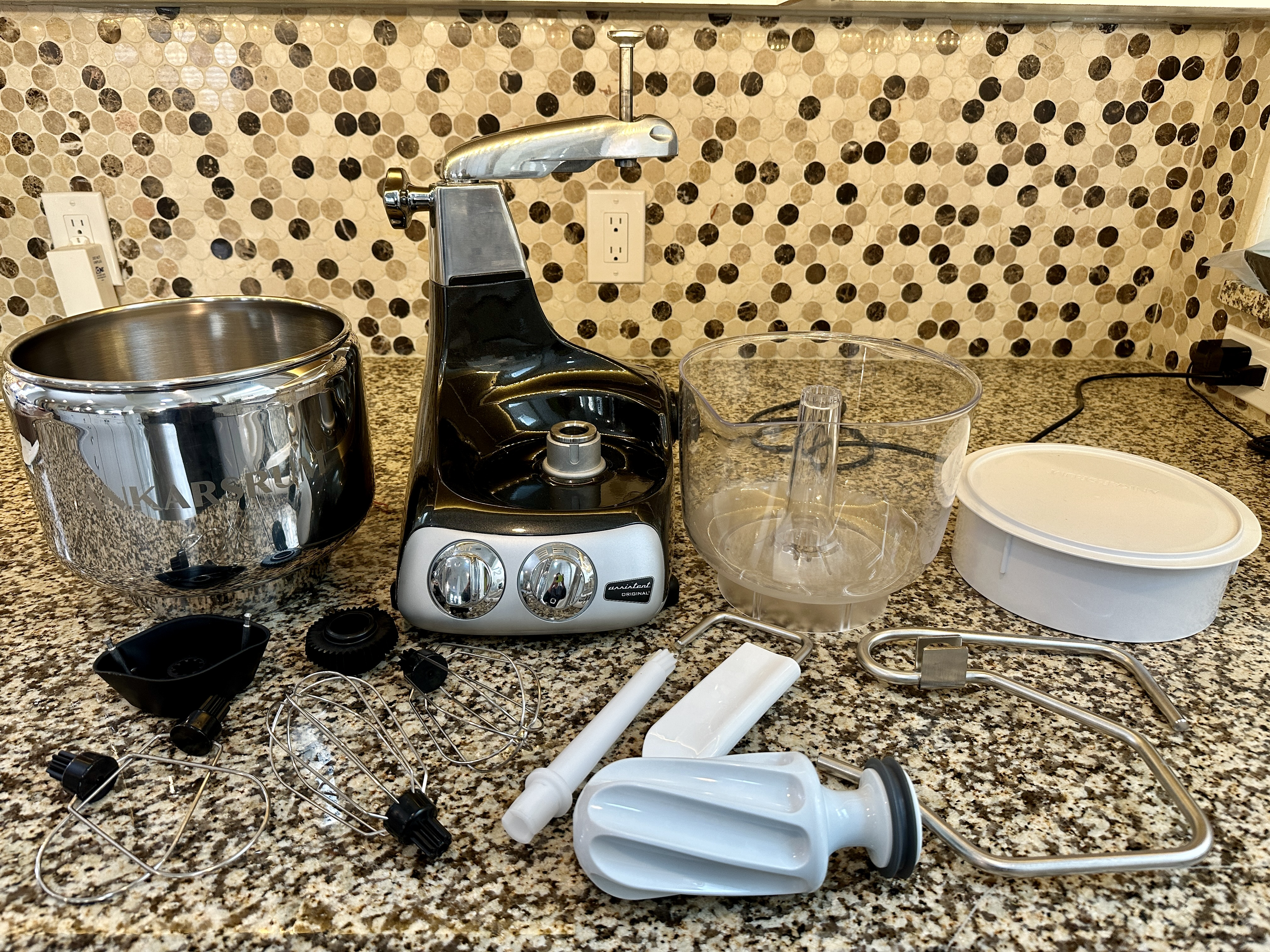
2024 model with included attachments and accessories

=== Standard accessories ===
As of 2024 the Assistent is boxed with a stainless steel bowl, a plastic beater bowl, and a beater bowl cover. Utensils include a dough hook, dough roller, dough knife, whisk attachment, and beater attachment.

=== Additional accessories ===
A range of additional accessories are available, most of which are the typical accessories for a large mixer. Most attachments are driven using the main drive shaft used to drive the bowl, however, some – such as the meat grinder or pasta roller – require the machine to be set on its side and/or use a separate drive. Attachments available include:

- Meat mincer, which has additional attachments such as a sausage horn, strainer or nut grinder
- Vegetable grater
- Citrus press
- Pasta roller
- Coffee and grain mill
- Double beater for lighter cake mixtures.
- Flake mill, which rolls grains such as oats and buckwheat to make muesli
- Blender, which uses a separate higher rpm drive shaft at the rear of the machine
