= Therma (company) =

Swiss electrical appliance manufacturer

- Formerly: Fabrik für elektrische Wärmeapparate
- Company type: Joint-stock company
- Industry: Electrical appliances
- Founded: 1904 in Schwanden, Switzerland
- Founder: Samuel Blumer
- Fate: Absorbed into the Electrolux group
- Headquarters: Schwanden, Switzerland
- Products: Irons, water heaters, electric hotplates, stoves, refrigerators, kitchen units
- Number of employees: over 1,000 in Schwanden (end of WWII)

Therma was a Swiss electrical appliance manufacturer based in Schwanden. It became a leading producer of electric kitchen appliances before being absorbed into the Electrolux group.

== History ==
Therma goes back to the Fabrik für elektrische Wärmeapparate (factory for electrical heating appliances) founded by Samuel Blumer at Schwanden in 1904. Blumer and his financial backers converted the firm into a joint-stock company under the name Therma in 1907 and erected a new production building, which was continually extended. Irons, water heaters, and above all its own electric hotplates—from 1927 stoves for commercial kitchens, from 1932 refrigerators, and from 1955 kitchen units—brought Therma large sales abroad and gave it a monopoly position in Switzerland. At the end of the Second World War it employed more than 1,000 people in Schwanden alone.

Following a decline in sales, Therma was taken over by the Electrolux group Switzerland in 1978, the manufacture of refrigerators and kitchens was given up, and distribution was moved to Zürich. In 1998 Therma was merged within the group with AEG Hausgeräte AG Schweiz to form A+T Hausgeräte AG, which was integrated into Electrolux AG in 2005.

== Bibliography ==
- 100 Jahre Innovation in der elektrischen Küche, 2007
