= Electrolux =

Swedish multinational home appliance manufacturer

Electrolux AB

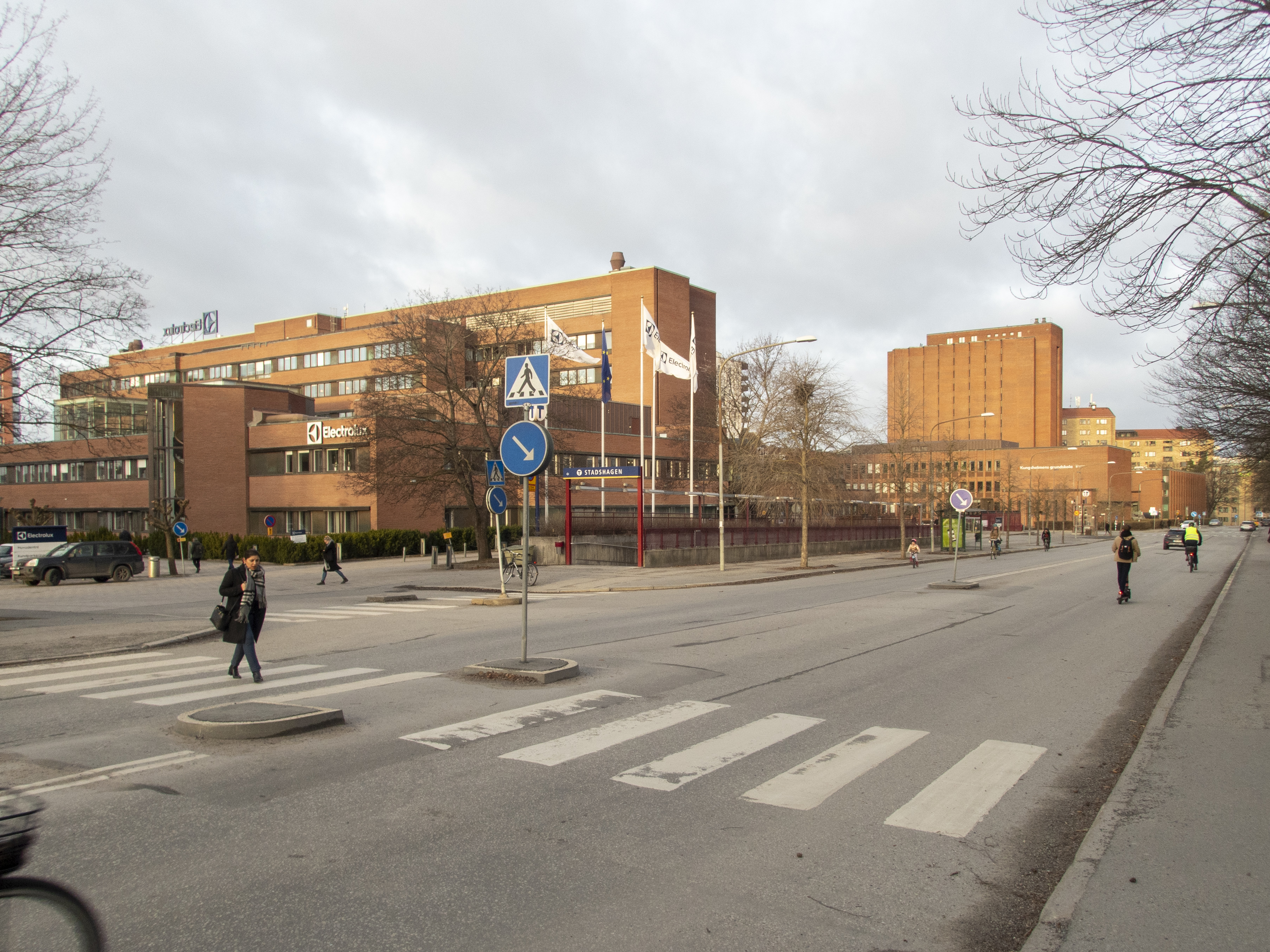
- Electrolux headquarters in Stockholm
- Formerly: Elektromekaniska AB (1910–1919); Elektrolux AB (1919–1957)
- Type: Public
- Traded as: Nasdaq Stockholm: ELUX A; Nasdaq Stockholm: ELUX B
- ISIN: SE0000103806; SE0000103814
- Industry: Home appliance
- Founded: January 19, 1910; 116 years ago
- Founders: Sven Carlstedt; Axel Wenner-Gren
- Headquarters: Stockholm, Sweden
- Area served: Worldwide
- Key people: Staffan Bohman (chairman); Yannick Fierling (president & CEO)
- Products: Home appliances; Major appliances; Small appliances; Service robots
- Revenue: ▲134.880 billion kr (2022)
- Operating income: ▼ –215 million kr (2022)
- Net income: ▼ –1.320 billion kr (2022)
- Total assets: ▲127.102 billion kr (2022)
- Total equity: ▲16.449 billion kr (2022)
- Owner: Investor AB (16.4%; 28.4% votes)
- Number of employees: 41,000 (2024)
- Subsidiaries: AEG; Electrolux Italy; Frigidaire; Molteni; Westinghouse; Kelvinator
- Website: group.electrolux.com

Electrolux AB (Swedish: [ɛˈlɛ̂kːtrʊˌlɵks, ɛlɛktrʊˈlɵks]; originally Elektromekaniska AB and later Elektrolux AB) is a Swedish multinational home appliance manufacturer, headquartered in Stockholm. It is consistently ranked the world's second largest appliance maker by units sold, after Whirlpool.

Founded in 1910, Electrolux products are sold under a variety of brand names (including its own), and are primarily major appliances and vacuum cleaners intended for home consumer use.

Electrolux has a primary listing on the Stockholm Stock Exchange.

== History ==
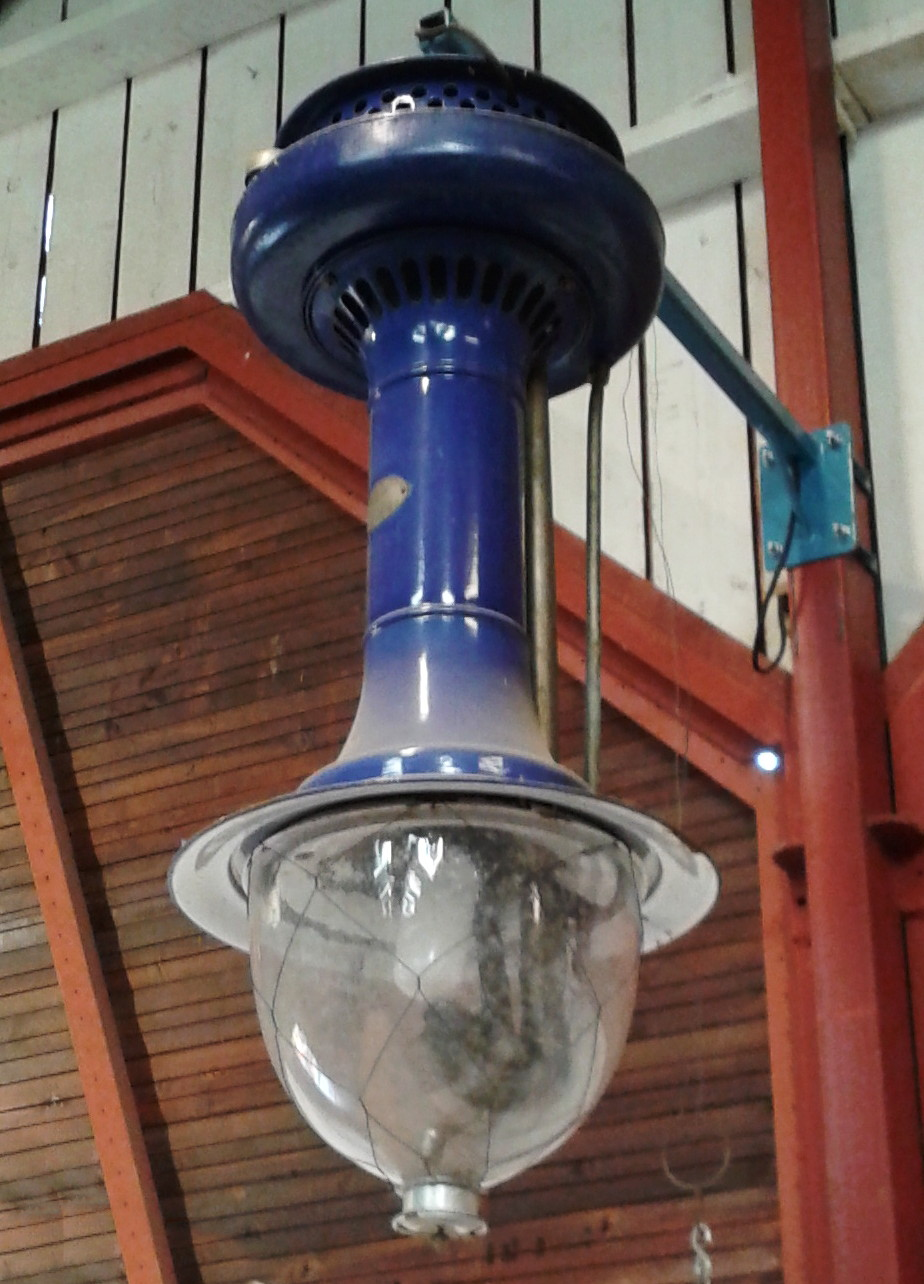
The Autoluxlamp, a kerosene lamp manufactured by Lux and used in railway stations around the world in the early 20th century

=== Elektromekaniska and Lux (1910–1919) ===
The Elektromekaniska company was founded in Stockholm on 19 January 1910 by engineer Sven Carlstedt (1847-1924), as a manufacturer of universal motors for vacuum cleaners, designed by him together with Eberhardt Seger.

In 1912, Carlstedt met Axel Wenner-Gren (1881-1961), a salesman, who proposed that he start a collaboration with Lux, a company producing kerosene lamps for outdoor use founded in 1901, whose owner was Carl G. Lindblom.

Carlsted and Lindblom, convinced by Wenner-Gren, started an important collaboration between their companies: Lux specialized in the production of vacuum cleaners under license from the American Keller Manufacturing Company of Philadelphia (producer of the Santo vacuum cleaners), on which the motors produced by Elektromekaniska were mounted.

In 1915, Wenner-Gren founded Svenska Elektron, with which he was able to market his vacuum cleaner model under the Elektron brand, produced on commission by another company, which recorded a significant commercial success.

The following year, in 1916, Svenska Elektron acquired the majority of shares in Elektromekaniska, of which Wenner-Gren took over the management, and two years later, in 1918, it acquired significant shares in Lux.

=== Elektrolux (1919–1957) ===
On August 29, 1919, the company name of Elektromekaniska was officially changed to Elektrolux, of which Wenner-Gren was the majority shareholder and president. The new name assigned to the company was in fact the combination of the previous name and that of Lux, for which it carried out commercial distribution abroad.

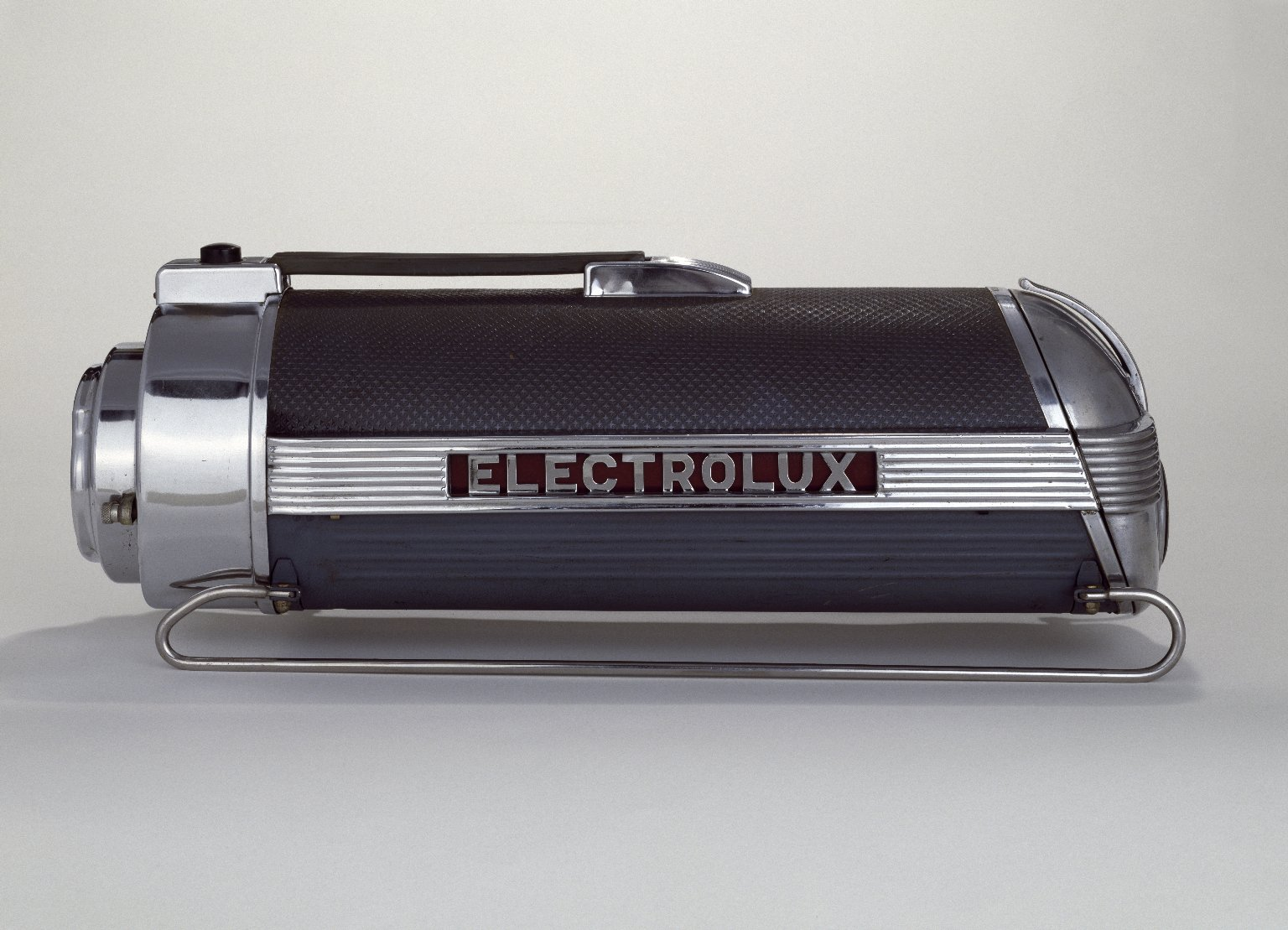
Vacuum cleaner designed by Lurelle Guild c. 1937 Brooklyn Museum

Electrolux made an initial public offering on the London Stock Exchange in 1928 (it was delisted in 2010) and another on the Stockholm Stock Exchange in 1930.

As of 2010, its shares trade on the NASDAQ OMX Nordic Market and over-the-counter. Electrolux is an OMX Nordic 40 constituent stock.

In 1923, the company acquired Arctic and subsequently added absorption refrigerators to its product line. Other appliances soon followed, including washing machines in 1951, dishwashers in 1959, and food service equipment in 1962.

=== Electrolux (1957–present) ===
Former logo (1961–2015)

In 1957, Elektrolux changed its name to Electrolux.

While Electrolux had bought several companies before the 1960s, that decade saw the beginnings of a new wave of M&A activity. The company bought ElektroHelios, Norwegian Elektra, Danish Atlas, Finnish Slev, and Flymo, et al., in the nine years from 1960 to 1969. It sold its American subsidiary to Consolidated Foods and exited the American market in 1968, only returning in 1974 when Electrolux acquired Eureka-Williams from National Union, one of the oldest names in the vacuum cleaner industry. Electrolux sold its vacuum cleaners using the Eureka brand name in North America until 2004.

This style of growth continued through the 1990s, seeing Electrolux purchase scores of companies including, for a time, Husqvarna.

Hans Werthén, President and later chairman of the board, led the strategic core of an increasingly decentralized Electrolux—and was instrumental to its rapid growth.

While attempts to cut costs, centralise administration, and wring out economies of scale from Electrolux's operations were made in the 1960s and 1970s with the focus so firmly on growth, further company-wide restructuring efforts only began in the late 1990s.

In North America, the Electrolux name was long used by vacuum cleaner manufacturer Aerus, originally established to sell Swedish Electrolux products. In 2000, Aerus transferred trademark rights back to the Electrolux Group, and ceased using the Electrolux name in 2004.

Conversely, Electrolux-made vacuums carried the Eureka brand name, which Electrolux continued to use while also selling Electrolux branded vacuums after 2000. Electrolux USA customer service maintains a database of Electrolux made vacuums and provides a link to Aerus's website for the convenience of owners of Electrolux branded Aerus vacuums.

Keith McLoughlin took over as president and CEO on 1 January 2011, and became the company's first non Swedish chief executive.

In August 2011, Electrolux acquired from Sigdo Koppers the Chilean appliance manufacturer CTI obtaining several brands with the purchase including: Fensa, Gafa, Mademsa and Somela.

On 6 February 2017, Electrolux announced that it had agreed to acquire Anova Applied Electronics, the U.S.-based provider of the Anova Precision Cooker.

On 23 March 2020, Electrolux completed the spin-off of its professional division, which the separated company incorporated as Electrolux Professional.

In September 2023, it was announced Electrolux has sold its refrigerator manufacturing facility in Nyíregyháza to the Malmö-headquartered heat pump systems and technology company, Qvantum for €38 million.

== Operations in Norway ==
Electrolux set up a Norwegian subsidiary in 1920, primarily a sales and service company for the vacuum cleaners and refrigerators with which the Elektrolux name (as it was then spelled) was synonymous, along with floor polishers. A small production of Elektrolux vacuum cleaners took place in Oslo in the late 1930s, and was resumed in 1951–1952 in connection with the depot and workshop at Sinsen in Oslo, probably to relieve the postwar problem that demand for these products far exceeded what the factories could deliver, as well as Norwegian import restrictions. An advertising campaign in 1952 noted that it had been 12 years since the previous advertisement, expressing hope that the long delivery times would soon be overcome. In addition, the kitchen-equipment and refrigerator maker Aanonsen began producing refrigerators and freezers under the Electrolux brand in the 1950s.

In line with Swedish Electrolux's new expansion policy, the Norwegian kitchen and white-goods landscape changed through the 1960s. The ASEA-owned ElektroHelios, which had a Norwegian subsidiary from 1960, was bought by Electrolux in 1962. The two Norwegian subsidiaries, A/S Electrolux and ElektroHelios A/S, then divided the tasks between them: Electrolux took vacuum cleaners and floor polishers, while ElektroHelios took over Electrolux's refrigeration and freezing products, large-kitchen machines, and the classic Assistent food mixer, in addition to its own wide range of electrical consumer products, which were leading on the Swedish market for cookers, refrigerators and freezers, toasters, and irons.

=== Cooker factory at Eidsvoll ===
ElektroHelios's responsibilities for production and marketing also included the Norwegian brand Elektra, which the ASEA-owned Per Kure made at Hasle in Oslo. This was a Swiss-Austrian brand from around 1900, established by the electric-cooker pioneer F. W. Schindler; Per Kure had obtained the Norwegian licence for Elektra in 1911 and built it into one of the leading brands in Norway, developing its own stoves and other products for the Norwegian market under the Elektra name.

The Hasle factory needed more space after 1960 for the production of ASEA transformers for power stations, and a new factory for stoves and cookers was then built at the disused Bønsdalen paper mill in Eidsvoll. Some 300–400 new jobs were promised, to great rejoicing in a municipality that had lost one of its large employers when the paper mill closed. In its first full production year in 1967, over 21,000 cookers and as many as 236,323 heaters were made. Production was based on parts from suppliers including Novak Emaljeverk in Drammen, but the factory was gradually expanded with greater in-house production, its own enamel works, and better storage.

In 1967 the cooperation between ElektroHelios A/S (Electrolux Industrier A/S from 1968) and ASEA Per Kure was formalized by separating the stove factory from Per Kure into a company, A/S Elektra, owned by Electrolux Industrier. With that, Electrolux gained a modern cooker factory which, together with others in Sweden, could help consolidate Electrolux into a white-goods giant with international clout. The Eidsvoll factory was part of these plans and produced cookers for many different brands, such as ElektroHelios and ASEA for the Swedish market, Elektra for the Norwegian, AEG and eventually Husqvarna, while Electrolux was gradually established as a cooker brand as well. A/S Elektra was merged into Electrolux Industrier in 1973, and the Elektra brand discontinued.

The Eidsvoll factory became the leading Norwegian white-goods factory, with steady production increases through the 1970s and 1980s; cooker number 500,000 left the factory in 1977, and just seven years later came cooker number one million. The economic downturn after 1987, with rising unemployment and higher interest rates, also affected appliance sales in the Nordic region. Eidsvoll stood strong after investment in modernization, efficiency, and quality certification, and was one of the group's most modern and profitable factories. When Electrolux's cooker production had to be concentrated in fewer factories, this was therefore done in favor of Eidsvoll and at the expense of a Finnish and a Danish factory, with fashionable built-in products and new production lines for heaters transferred to Eidsvoll, though the workforce nonetheless had to be reduced to under 200.

At this time the factory was one plant in two main parts: a metalworking factory that produced parts from thin sheet metal delivered in rolls to Bønsdalen, and an assembly factory for cookers, both freestanding and built-in ovens with separate cooktops. All parts for assembly except the metal parts were supplied to the factory from other group or external suppliers, including hotplates, switches, and wiring, as well as design details in glass and plastic; most of the work was manual skilled labor. There were also separate production lines for heaters and compact cookers, as well as some component production for other Electrolux factories. Through the 1990s the factory ran at full capacity, but with constant reminders of an insecure future, as new group factories with even better profitability emerged from Eastern Europe and elsewhere. During 2002 the factory was wound down; most of the machines were dismantled and sent to other group factories or sold, much of the equipment and furnishings were sold to benefit the local sports club, and the entire 15,000-square-meter factory was eventually sold and converted to rental storage.

=== Merger with Husqvarna ===
In 1978 the Swedish parent company merged with another giant, Husqvarna. With partly overlapping products in areas including household appliances, restructuring of the company's production plants was likely, including in Norway. For Electrolux Industrier this meant taking over the former cooker giant KPS in Sarpsborg, which Electrolux itself had outcompeted with its Eidsvoll factory. Owned by Husqvarna, the factory had generated large losses on the production of many different appliances, from heaters to dishwashers; under Electrolux, the old KPS, renamed Tunsborg, was specialized toward dishwashers under the Husqvarna brand.

=== Norlett and Jo-Bu ===
In 1979 Electrolux took over the chainsaw factory Jo-Bu in Drøbak. Under the ownership of Elkem-Spigerverket the international competition had hardened, and Husqvarna, now owned by Electrolux, was a main challenger. When Electrolux-Husqvarna bought Jo-Bu from Elkem in 1979, many feared that Jo-Bu's days were numbered. Strict licence conditions were imposed to protect the Drøbak factory, but the realities gradually had to be faced: more efficient production and better service facilities and availability were required. The Drøbak factory was first reduced to producing simpler electric chainsaws, before it was closed in 1982.

A similar course affected the Østfold firm Norlett, founded in 1948 as Norsk Lettmetall, which Electrolux took over in 1980. The factory produced garden equipment such as lawn mowers, garden tractors, and tillers and snow blowers at Askim and Ørje. Strict licence conditions had been set for the takeover, including a municipal requirement that the company continue and not be moved or have its workforce cut, as many feared. Such requirements could not be met. After a brief expansion by the new owners, the economy turned to losses in 1983–1984, and the skeptics were proved right: the new owner Electrolux found it necessary to rationalize and move Norlett production to other Electrolux factories, including the former KPS factory at Tune in Sarpsborg. 150 Norlett employees were laid off, and about 100 were offered jobs at the Tune factory.

The Norlett case aroused great political engagement at a time when many traditional industrial firms came under pressure, and when municipal requirements and licences proved to be worth little. The employees went on strike, and neighboring firms joined in solidarity. Accusations of broken promises were leveled at both Electrolux's Norwegian management and its Swedish owners. There were demands that the government intervene, but the message from the Ministry of Industry was clear that one could not, as a newspaper report in June 1984 put it, force a company to operate at a loss.

The consolidation at the Sarpsborg factory for Husqvarna's brands kept production going there. The old KPS was eventually specialized as the production site for the bars of all Husqvarna's chainsaws globally. After Husqvarna and Electrolux separated again in 2006, this production continued under the Husqvarna name, but was finally wound down in 2021.

== Notable products ==
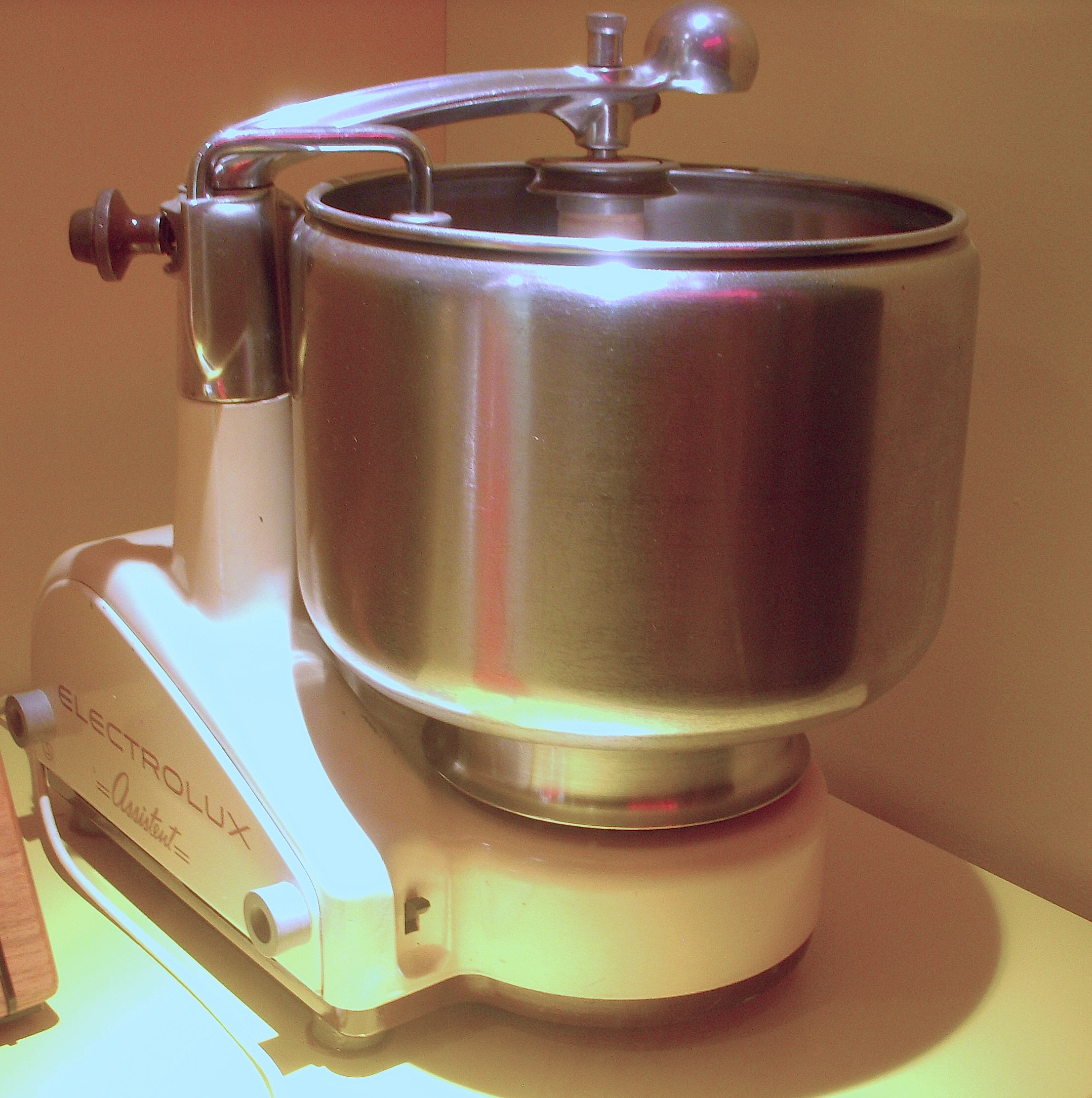
Electrolux Assistent, 1940

- 1919: The Lux vacuum is the first product Electrolux sells.
- 1925: D, Electrolux's first refrigerator, is an absorption model.
- 1937: Electrolux model 30 vacuum is unveiled.
- 1940: Assistent (Swedish for assistant), the company's only wartime consumer product, is a mixer/food processor.
- 1941: Charlton automatic rifle, an automatic rifle developed to fill in for the Bren light machine gun and Lewis gun amid shortages in the Home Guard, developed from the Lee–Enfield.
- 1951: W 20, Electrolux's first home washing machine, is manufactured in Gothenburg, Sweden.
- 1959: D 10, the company's first dishwasher, is a counter top model nicknamed "round jar".
- 2001: Launch of the Electrolux Trilobite, a robotic vacuum cleaner.

== Brands ==
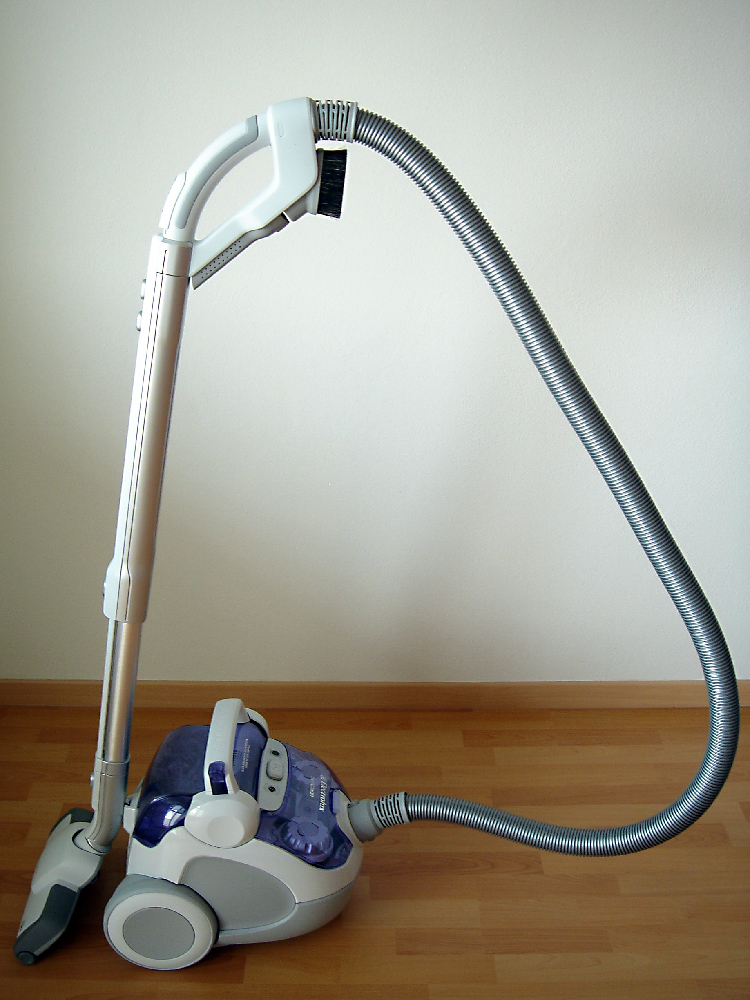
An Electrolux canister vacuum cleaner

Electrolux sells under a wide variety of brand names worldwide. Most of them were acquired through mergers and acquisitions and only do business in a single country or geographic area. The following is an incomplete list.

=== Africa ===
- Olympic Group, home appliance brand in Egypt

=== Asia ===
- King, Israeli kitchen appliance brand made by Rex, an Italian Electrolux subsidiary.

=== Europe ===
- Arthur Martin
- AEG
- Atlas (Denmark)
- Corberó (Spain)
- Elektro Helios, manufacturer of consumer appliances for the Swedish market
- Faure, French consumer appliance maker
- Lehel, consumer appliance brand sold in Hungary and elsewhere. Acquired in 1991, the brand has not been in use since 1999.
- Marynen/Marijnen, consumer product brand sold in the Netherlands
- Parkinson Cowan, cooking appliances (United Kingdom)
- Progress, vacuum cleaner brand sold throughout Europe
- Rex, Italian appliance manufacturer that became part of Electrolux in 1984
- Rosenlew, Finnish consumer product brand sold in Nordic countries
- Samus, Romanian producer of cooking stoves headquartered in Satu Mare
- Voss, premium consumer cooking appliance and equipment supplier in Denmark and elsewhere
- Zanker, consumer kitchen appliance brand sold in central Europe
- Zanussi, Italian appliance manufacturer that became part of Electrolux in 1984
- Zanussi Professional, professional kitchen equipment manufacturer
- Zoppas, Italian appliance manufacturer that became part of Electrolux in 1984

=== North America ===
- Anova Applied Electronics, provider of the Anova Precision Cooker
- Electrolux ICON, premium consumer appliance brand sold in the U.S.
- Eureka, American consumer vacuum cleaner brand, Sold to Midea in 2016
- Frigidaire, major appliance manufacturer.
- Gibson, refrigerator and air conditioning manufacturer
- Philco, former U.S. consumer electronics and appliance manufacturer for appliances, though the brand name is also used separately for electronics by Philips
- Sanitaire, commercial product division of Eureka
- Tappan, former U.S. appliance manufacturer
- White-Westinghouse, former U.S. appliance manufacturer

=== Oceania ===
- Dishlex, a budget-friendly dishwasher brand sold in Australia (discontinued in August 2021)
- Kelvinator, an air conditioning and fridge freezer brand sold in Australia, India and elsewhere (discontinued in Australia April 2026)
- Simpson, previously sold kitchen and laundry appliances, now they only sell laundry appliances. They are a brand sold in Australia and New Zealand. (discontinued in July 2022)
- Westinghouse, a kitchen and laundry appliance brand in Australia.
- Chef, a brand specialising in cooking appliances such as ovens and stoves. Most of their products are manufactured in Australia.

=== South America ===
- Fensa, Chilean consumer appliance brand, widely available in Latin America.
- Gafa, Argentinean appliance manufacturer.
- Mademsa, Chilean home appliance brand
- Somela, Chilean home appliance brand, available throughout Latin America

=== Global ===
- Arthur Martin-Electrolux
- Beam, Electrolux's central vacuum brand
- Castor
- Dito, professional food processing equipment
- Electrolux Professional
- Frigidaire, full range major appliance brand sold globally
- Juno-Electrolux, premium consumer kitchen appliance brand
- Molteni, professional stoves
- Tornado, vacuum cleaners and other consumer products
- Therma (acquired in 1978)
- Tricity Bendix
- Volta, vacuum cleaner brand sold in Australia, Sweden and elsewhere

This list does not include brands such as Kenmore, IKEA, and John Lewis, which may sell Electrolux produced appliances but are not owned by or affiliated with Electrolux, as Electrolux acts as an OEM for these brands.

== Slogan ==
The company's international slogan is "Shape living for the better". In the past it was "Thinking of you".

In the 1960s, the company successfully marketed vacuums in the United Kingdom (UK) with the slogan "Nothing sucks like an Electrolux". In the United States, it was often assumed that this slogan was a brand blunder, but the informal American meaning of the word "sucks" was already well known in the UK, and the company selected it deliberately in the hopes that the slogan, with its double entendre, would gain attention.

In Indonesia, the Electrolux previous slogan was "Kalau saja semua seawet Electrolux" (English: If only all are as durable as Electrolux).

== See also ==
- Constructor Group, a former Electrolux subsidiary not involved in major appliance manufacture
