= Anova Culinary =

Smart kitchen appliances

- Type: Subsidiary
- Industry: Home automation
- Founded: 2013; 13 years ago
- Founders: Stephen Svajian; Jeff Wu; Natalie Vaughn
- Headquarters: San Francisco, California, U.S.
- Key people: Stephen Svajian (CEO)
- Products: Anova Precision Cooker,
- Number of employees: 28 (2017)
- Parent: Independent (2013–2017) Electrolux (2017–present)
- Website: www.anovaculinary.com

Anova Culinary, officially known as Anova Applied Electronics, Inc., is a company headquartered in San Francisco that sells IoT-connected kitchen appliances designed for home cooking, such as sous-vide cookers, combination ovens, and vacuum sealers. In 2014, Anova introduced the Anova Precision Cooker, the first sous-vide cooking device with Bluetooth connectivity, followed by a Wi-Fi-enabled version in 2015.

On February 6, 2017, Anova was acquired by Electrolux, a home appliance company, for a total of US$250 million. This was the first multimillion-dollar purchase of a smart kitchen brand.

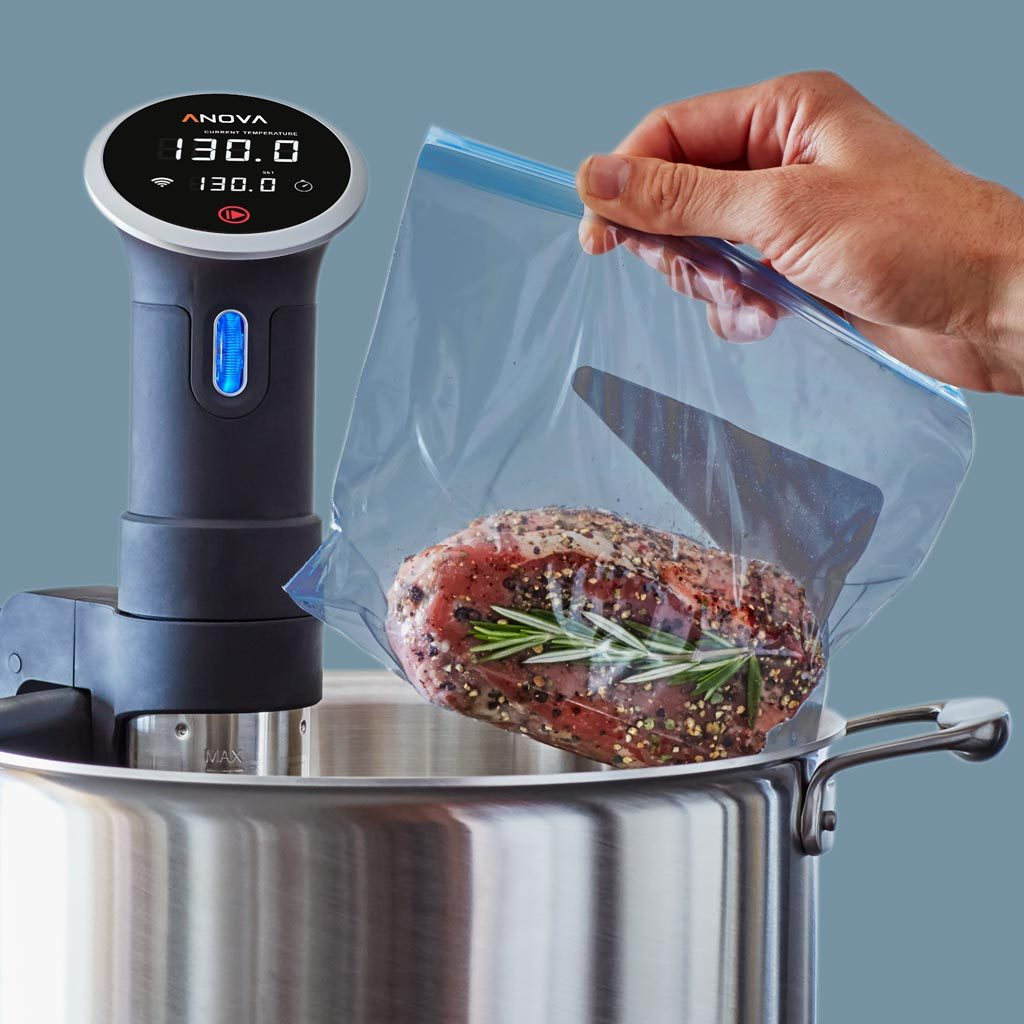
Anova sous-vide cooker

== History ==
Anova Culinary was founded in 2013 by Stephen Svajian, Jeff Wu, and Natalie Vaughn. The company originally manufactured temperature control products for scientific laboratories.

In 2010, Wu developed an initial proof of concept for an affordable home sous vide device, which he called the Anova.

In 2013, Anova Culinary released the Anova One, an immersion circulator that could be attached to an existing pot to circulate water as it heated.

The Anova Precision Cooker, released in 2014, was the first connected sous-vide device. The device's wand-like immersion circulator could be attached to a pot or container to cook food at specific times and temperatures, and users could control the device through the company's app on their mobile devices with Bluetooth.

Subsequent products included the Anova Precision Cooker Nano and the Anova Precision Oven, a countertop combi oven that supported both steam and convection cooking methods and could be used either alongside other Precision Cooker products or by itself.

The Anova Culinary App, available for Android and iOS devices, provides access to recipes and allows users to control temperature settings for multiple dishes using Anova products.

== Acquisitions ==
=== Get Fresh, Inc. ===
In 2015, Anova Culinary purchased marketing agency Get Fresh, Inc. for US$9.2 million.

=== Electrolux ===
On February 6, 2017, Electrolux announced it agreed to acquire Anova Culinary for $250M USD, paying $115 million in cash up front and an additional $135 million for adjustments and achievement of certain financial objectives. Anova retained its brand identity and the leadership of its CEO Stephan Svajian. The purchase was part of Electrolux's plans to move into the smart kitchen and home device market.

== Partnerships ==
During the 2017 International Home and Housewares Show, Anova revealed a collaboration with Stasher, a manufacturer of silicone bags, to offer reusable and resealable bags for sous vide cooking. On July 25, 2017, Anova announced a partnership with Field Company to release a limited batch of the Field cast iron skillet before it was publicly available.
