= Aanonsen Fabrikker =

Norwegian metalware manufacturer

- Formerly: A. Aanonsen; A. Aanonsens Blik- & Metalvarefabrik; Aanonsen Jernvarefabrikk
- Type: Aksjeselskap
- Industry: Metalware
- Founded: 1881
- Founder: Arent Martinius Aanonsen
- Headquarters: Oslo, Norway
- Products: Tinware, scales, household metal goods, refrigerators and freezers, bathroom furniture

Aanonsen Fabrikker was a factory in Oslo that produced tinware, scales, metal household articles, refrigerators and freezers, and bathroom furniture. The company name lives on today as a brand in the firm Aanonsen Jernvarer.

== History ==
Arent Martinius Aanonsen (1843–1913), who came from Arendal, was both a consul general and an insurance agent, living in Kristiania. After moving to the capital he seems to have been involved in various enterprises, registering his first firm around 1872. In 1874 he advertised the sale of oil prints from his office at Koppgården by Stortorvet, and at an exhibition in 1877 he sold rifles and sewing machines from Husqvarna, for which he was an agent. He took up citizenship in Kristiania in 1881.

From the start Aanonsen worked in selling insurance, and in 1885 he took over the general agency for the English insurance company Sun Fire Insurance Office, with the fire and life insurance company SVEA another of the firm's agencies. He also ran a stove business connected to the insurance business in Skippergaten 44. As an insurance man he was concerned with fire safety, and so in 1881 he started a tinsmith firm under the name A. Aanonsen to produce stove pipes and metal containers for fuel and ash, as well as other metal goods.

=== The sons take over ===
When Arent Martinius Aanonsen died in 1913, his sons Sverre and Olaf Aanonsen took over. They pursued growth under the name A. Aanonsens Blik- og Metalvarefabrik and put up modern factory and office premises in Lakkegata 21-23, completed in 1916. Progress was slow, however, through the war years and the economic unrest of the 1920s, a time also marked by labor conflicts.

=== Out of the depression with the next generation ===
The civil engineer Odd Richter, a member of the Aanonsen family, was hired in 1927. He reorganized the factory with rationalized production through time studies and production planning, and improved cooperation with the workers by being early in the industry to set up a cooperation committee. Production was concentrated on tin packaging, and tripled and turned profitable during the 1930s.

When Olaf Aanonsen died in 1936, Richter inherited part of the business, and when Sverre Aanonsen died in 1944, Richter was appointed director by the other heirs, who were Aanonsen's daughters and sons-in-law, and together they led the family business on. It expanded at the same time by acquiring Den Norske Knivfabrikk in Arendal and the file factory Forenede Filhuggere in Oslo, which were combined as Aanonsen Kniv- og Filfabrikk, first at Notodden and then at Kongsberg.

=== Aanonsen Fabrikker at Løren ===
In 1950 the firm changed its name to Aanonsen Fabrikker. Under Richter's leadership the product range was greatly expanded beyond the old core of tin packaging. A new kitchen scale was launched during the war and produced at 60,000 units a year by 1948, a success repeated with a bathroom scale that became a classic in many models, alongside metal products for the kitchen from simple utensils to kitchen sinks.

The most important new venture was in refrigeration and freezing technology. Even before 1940 the factory had delivered dry-ice-based plants for ice-cream production, and after the war it continued supplying compressor-based refrigeration plants to the same industry. At the same time, license agreements were made with Kelvinator and Electrolux to produce refrigerators for private households and refrigerated and freezer counters for shops. The postwar breakthrough in refrigeration and freezing technology and the building boom, with its need for bathroom and kitchen equipment, raised turnover from under 2 million kroner to over 25 million kroner between 1945 and 1960.

The large expansion both required and made possible the building of a new and modern factory at Løren of over 10,000 square meters. It opened in 1956 and was steadily expanded, and the refrigeration and freezing products in particular, along with kitchen sinks, were developed and produced there. Other products, such as kitchen utensils and bathroom scales, were moved to the factory in Lakkegata. This was possible because the tinware production was sold to the dominant competitor in Moss, Noblikk, and at the same time the Lakkegata factory was spun off as the subsidiary Aanonsen Jernvarefabrikk in 1963.

=== Sale to Emaljeverket ===
By this point Odd Richter had died and his heirs had sold out. Sverre Aanonsen's son-in-law, the civil engineer Haakon Søraas, led the family companies on, his main strategy being to seek cooperation with the neighbor at Løren, Emaljeverket. The two neighbors had partly overlapping and partly complementary production for the same market, and cooperation was a natural idea, not least because the first boom was over and competition from European suppliers was hardening.

In 1965 Aanonsen Fabrikker at Løren was bought by Emaljeverket. Rationalization of production led to products and production lines being moved from Løren to other Emaljeverket sites, primarily the Thermolux factory in Skien, which Emaljeverket also owned. As early as 1968, 33 workers and several salaried staff at Aanonsen were laid off when freezer-counter production was gathered in Skien.

The remaining Aanonsen Jernvarefabrikk moved into the vacant factory at Løren, still owned by the family. The Lakkegata property was sold, and the proceeds reinvested in a three-story addition to the administration block at Løren, as it still appears in a much-rebuilt neighborhood.

=== Focus on bathrooms ===
The remaining production was far smaller than the refrigeration and freezing production that had been sold, both in turnover and in space needs. New plans were laid for the company during the 1970s. The largest single products, personal and kitchen scales, were thought to face increasing competition and were sold to an Irish scale factory around 1980.

To build up volume in another area, the company invested heavily in bathroom furniture. Development and design took place at Løren, while production was carried out in cooperation with various subcontractors and partly at the company's own factory in Nannestad, formerly Sanro. The venture brought Aanonsen Bad among the leading Norwegian brands for bathroom furniture in the 1980s. Kitchen utensils and other small products were judged profitable as brands but not as Norwegian-produced industrial goods, and here the focus shifted instead to product development and marketing. This is an interesting early case of a transition that many Norwegian producers of consumer and branded goods would undergo in the years that followed, as did the family-owned company itself, which sold out of production and concentrated on property management.

=== Aanonsen Industrier in the 1980s ===
The production part was carried on in Aanonsen Industrier from 1984, with new owners. This company continued bathroom production and expanded into water heaters through several acquisitions in Bergen, Kongsberg, and Årnes, where this production was gathered. The venture by the owners at the time, Andenæs Industrier, was bold and perhaps typical of the period, and ended typically too after the banking crises of 1987. The plumbing business was closed in 1988, with 60 jobs lost, and the bathroom-furniture factory in Nannestad, formerly Sanro, went to the competitor Sigdal in Eggedal the same year, with 40 employees laid off or offered relocation.

=== The Aanonsen brand ===
The brand part, with kitchen utensils, scales, and the like, was spun off into a separate company run by Aanonsen's former sales director Roar With and his wife Wera. They kept up the Aanonsen brand on kitchen utensils and scales until they sold it on in 1998 and retired. The new owners were in the same trade and gathered the business in their industrial building at Oppaker in Nes Municipality in Akershus, where the product range was further developed and expanded.

In October 2023 the firm was again advertised for sale, as both the owners and most of the employees, four full-time equivalents in all, were nearing retirement age. The business was valued at 3.5 million kroner besides the stock, with a range of 700 different products, mostly under the classic Aanonsen brand, and a customer list including most leading grocery, hardware, and kitchen-equipment retailers. Aanonsen was bought by a group in Tønsberg, which moved the business there.
