= Acera School =

Location
- 5 Lowell Ave, Winchester, MA 01890; Winchester, Massachusetts; United States

Information
- School type: Independent
- Motto: "The Massachusetts School of Science, Creativity and Leadership"
- Established: 2010
- Founder: Courtney Dickinson
- Head of School: Heather J. Pinedo-Burns
- Grades: K–9
- Website: aceraschool.org

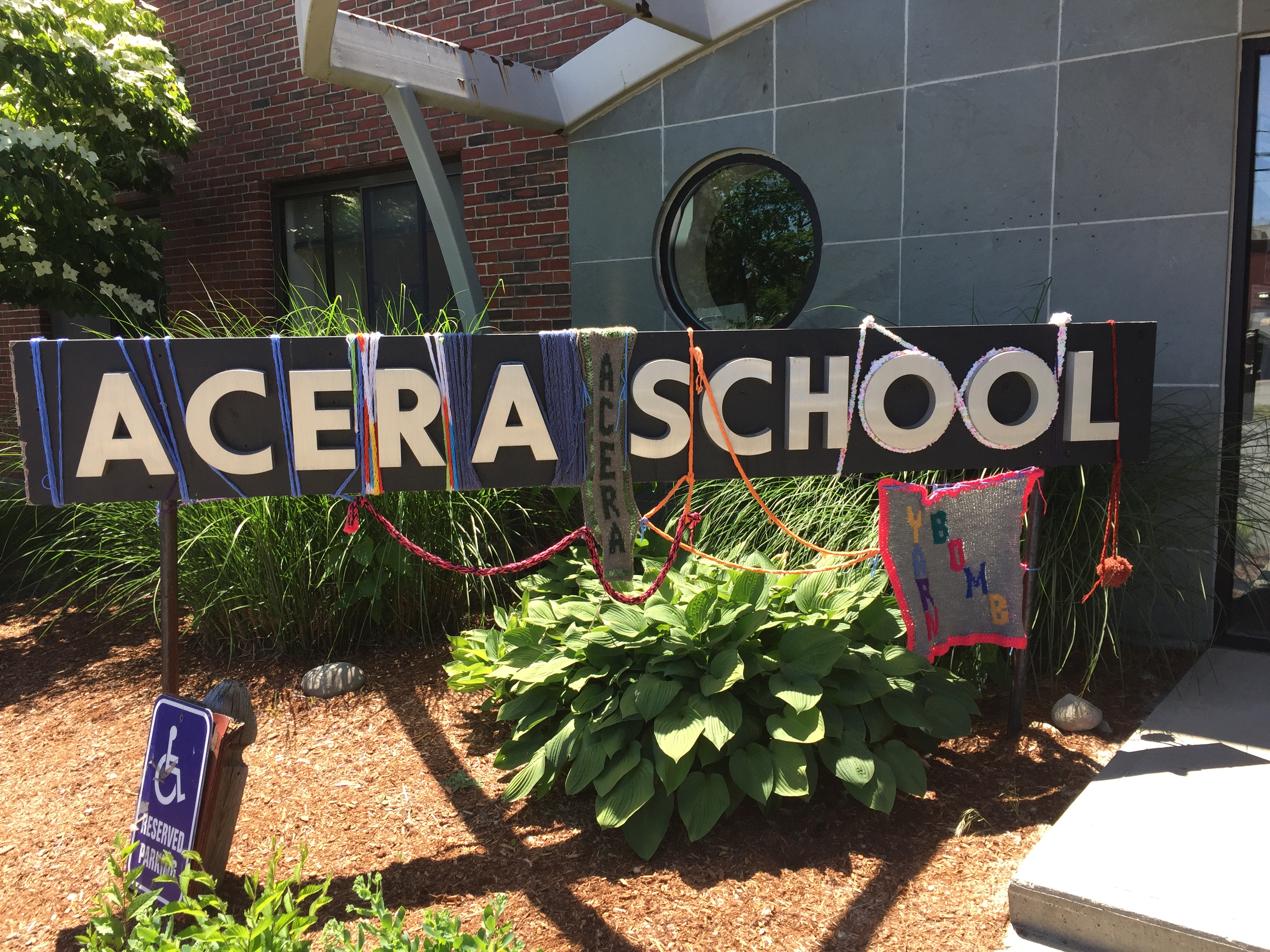
School sign yarn bombed

The Acera School is an independent, nonprofit, co-educational day school in Winchester, Massachusetts, United States, serving gifted students across Greater Boston in grades K–9. Acera's approach to gifted education prioritizes keeping every child's curiosity alive through individualized learning pathways, purpose-filled projects, ability-based math classes, and engaging electives that remove the ceiling of what is possible at school. Acera emphasizes the development of core capacities such as systems thinking, critical thinking and problem solving, creativity, ethical decision making, perspective taking, collaboration, emotional intelligence, and leadership.

== History ==
Acera School (formerly Anova School) was founded in 2010 by Courtney Dickinson, who identified a need for expanded educational opportunities for gifted students. In September 2010, Anova opened in Melrose, leasing a portion of the vacant former Decius Beebe Elementary School building from Melrose Public Schools.

In 2011, Anova School was renamed Acera School, and when its lease expired, moved to the First Methodist Church's annex building.

In fall 2013, Acera re-opened for its fourth year in Winchester, in its own building at 5 Lowell Avenue.

In 2023, Acera expanded its campus with the purchase of the adjacent building at 1 Lowell Avenue.

In 2024, Dr. Heather J. Pinedo- Burns joined the Acera community after two decades of experience in gifted education, and currently serves as Acera's Head of School.

== Student body ==
The school serves academically gifted students, creative students, and profoundly accelerated students. Acera requires that children take the WISC-IV assessment as part of the admissions process, as a precursor to a parent interview/visit.

In its first year, the Acera School offered three multi-age classrooms serving grades K–6. For the 2024–2025 school year, the school included a Lower Elementary class, 2 Intermediate Elementary classes, 1 Upper Elementary class, and 4 Middle classes.

By January 2020, Acera had enrolled 130 K–9 students.

== Curriculum ==
The Acera School curriculum is individualized for each student based on readiness and interests. Each student has an Individual Learning Plan that is updated each school year. Subjects such as math are taught in flexible cross-age groupings, with over a dozen math classes, allowing students to be placed in math classes that suit their abilities rather than their age. Students are given the opportunity to choose electives in Art/Tech/Engineering, Humanities & Social Sciences, and Natural Sciences & Math. In addition, Upper School students take on Inquiry, Maker & Passion Projects (IMPp), which are long-term, mentor-supported projects that reflect each student's individual passion/interest.

Acera's teaching philosophy is centered around eight guiding principles: Learning based on ability, individualized learning, integrated learning, early and deep exposure to STEM topics, building social emotional intelligence, creative problem-solving and complex thinking, safeguarding the spirit and curiosity of every student, and catalyzing student initiative.

=== Co-curricular activities ===
The school started offering an after-school program in its second year, and its after school enrichment programs and summer camps are open to students not enrolled at Acera during the school day. Boston Magazine named Acera "Best of Boston 2022" for its after-school catalog of activities open to the public. Learning is interdisciplinary and project-based, with themes inspired by the Museum of Science Engineering's Elementary (EiE) program. Model United Nations, Theater, and LARP are some of the optional after-school activities as of 2022.

Acera hosts the American Mathematics Competition AMC8 Exam each year along with the Noetic National Math Competition.

According to The Boston Globe, "Students at Acera: The Massachusetts School of Science, Creativity and Leadership in Winchester won first in the state and 15th internationally in the Purple Comet Math Meet. Approximately 2,800 teams from 55 countries participated. Purple Comet is a free, online, international math competition for high school and middle school students which has been conducted since 2003."
