= Mixer (appliance) =

Kitchen device

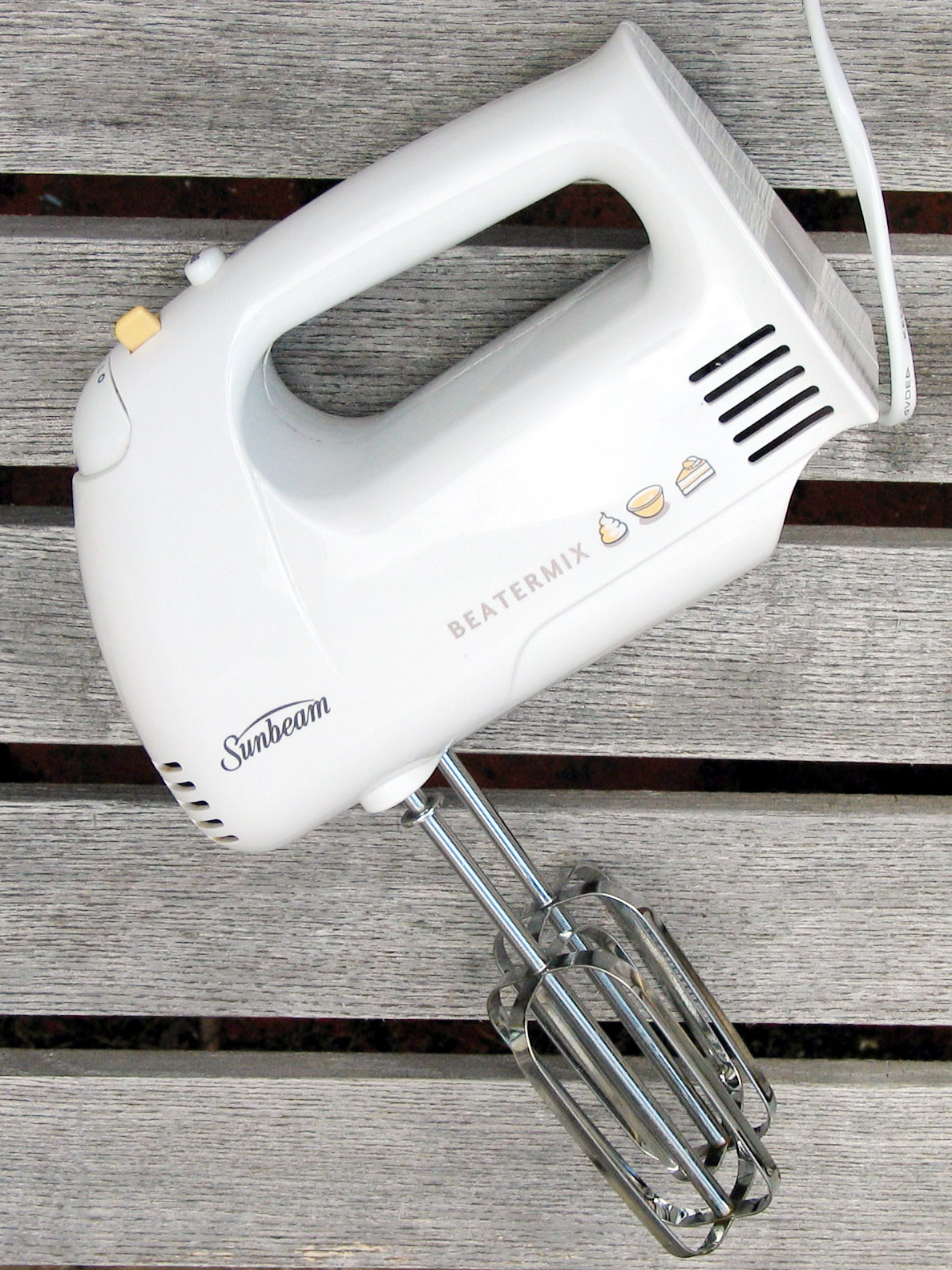
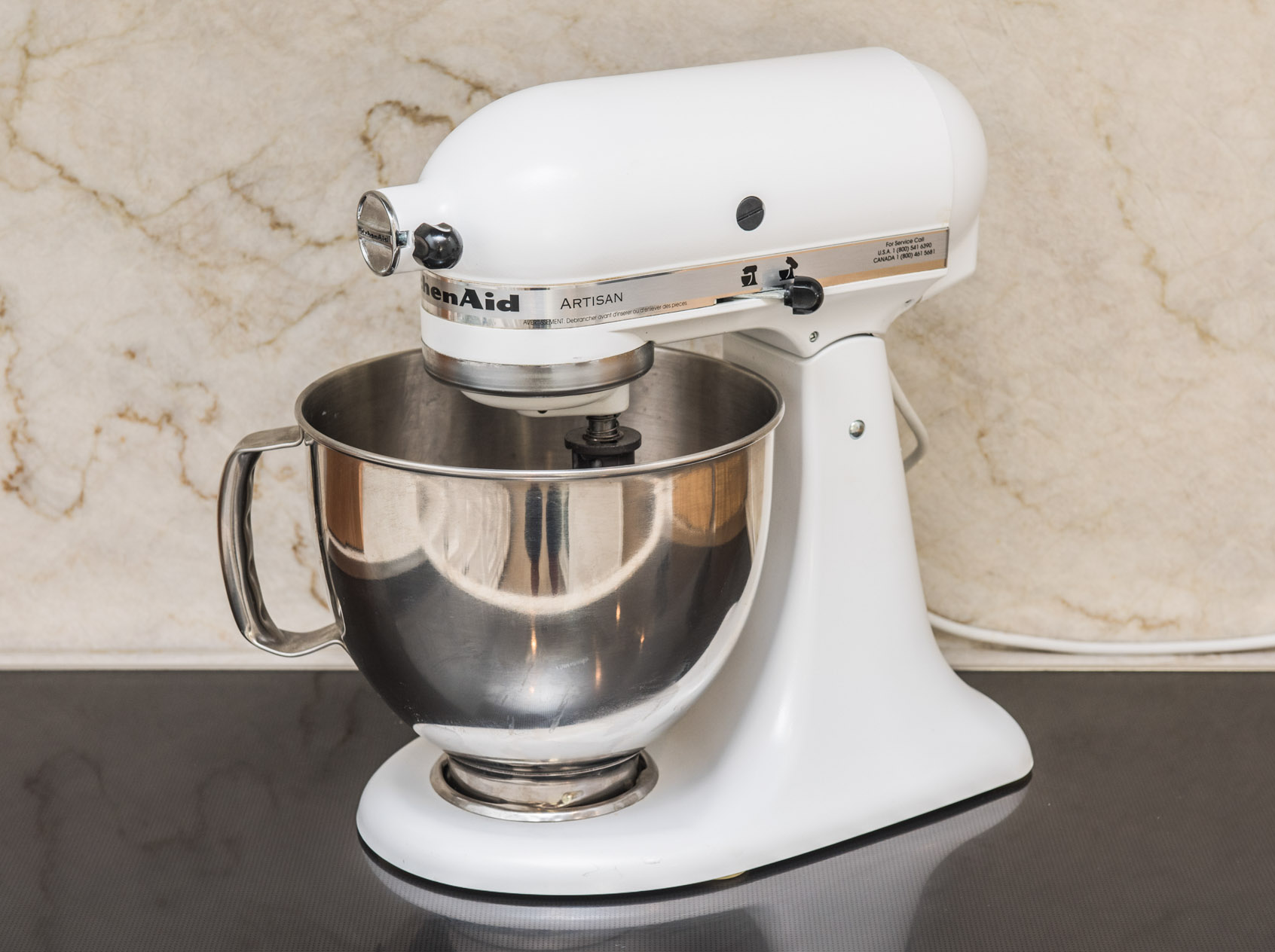
A hand mixer (left) and stand mixer (right) are two common mixers.

A mixer (also called a hand mixer or stand mixer depending on the type) is a kitchen device that uses a gear-driven mechanism to rotate a set of "beaters" in a bowl containing the food or liquids to be prepared by mixing them.

Mixers help automate the repetitive tasks of stirring, whisking or beating. When the beaters are replaced by a dough hook, a mixer may also be used to knead.

A mixer may be a handheld mechanism known as an eggbeater, a handheld motorized beater, or a drill mixer. Stand mixers vary in size from small counter top models for home use to large capacity commercial machines. Stand mixers create the mixing action by either rotating the mixing device vertically (planetary mixers), or by rotating the mixing container (spiral mixers).

== History ==
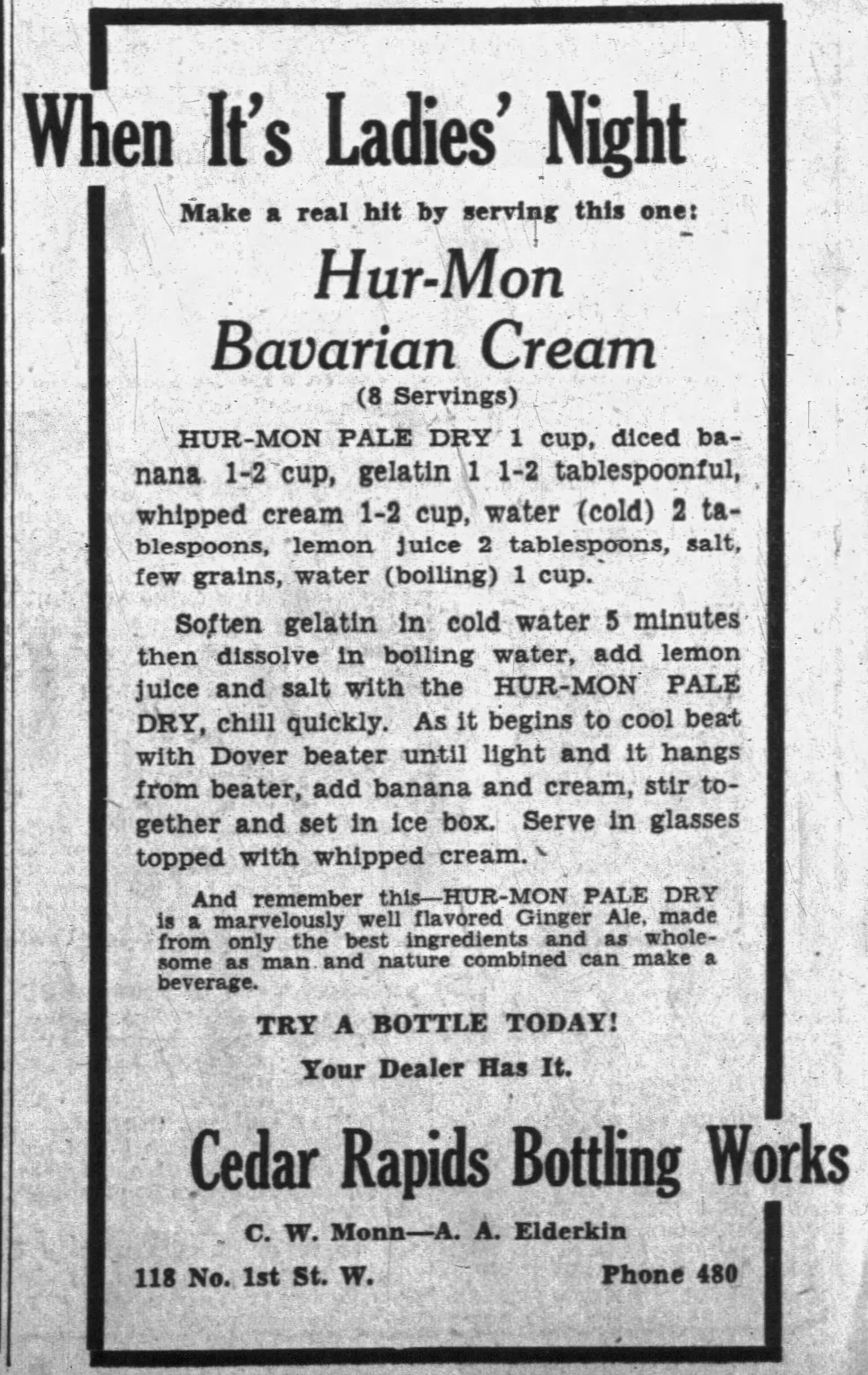
Whipped cream dessert made using a Dover beater, 1929.

The mixer with rotating parts was patented in 1856 by Baltimore, Maryland, tinner Ralph Collier. This was followed by E.P. Griffith's whisk patented in England in 1857. Another hand-turned rotary egg beater was patented by J.F. and E.P. Monroe in 1859 in the US. Their egg beater patent was one of the earliest bought up by the Dover Stamping Company, whose Dover egg beaters became a classic American brand. The term "Dover beater" was commonly in use in February 1929, as seen in this recipe from the Gazette newspaper of Cedar Rapids, IA, for "Hur-Mon Bavarian Cream," a whipped dessert recipe featuring gelatin, whipped cream, banana and gingerale. The Monroe design was also manufactured in England. In 1870, Turner Williams of Providence, R.I., invented another Dover egg beater model. In 1884, Willis Johnson of Cincinnati, Ohio, invented new improvements to the egg beater.

The first mixer with electric motor is thought to be the one invented by American Rufus Eastman in 1885. The Hobart Manufacturing Company was an early manufacturer of large commercial mixers, and they say a new model introduced in 1914 played a key role in the mixer part of their business. The Hobart KitchenAid and Sunbeam Mixmaster (first produced 1910) were two very early US brands of electric mixer. Domestic electric mixers were rarely used before the 1920s, when they were adopted more widely for home use.

In 1908 Herbert Johnston, an engineer for the Hobart Manufacturing Company, invented an electric standing mixer. His inspiration came from observing a baker mixing bread dough with a metal spoon; soon he was toying with a mechanical counterpart. By 1915, his 20-gallon (80 L) mixer was standard equipment for most large bakeries. In 1919, Hobart introduced the Kitchen Aid Food Preparer (stand mixer) for the home.

Older models of mixers originally listed each speed by name of operation (ex: Beat-Whip would be high speed if it is a 3-speed mixer); they are now listed by number.

== Variants ==
=== Eggbeater ===
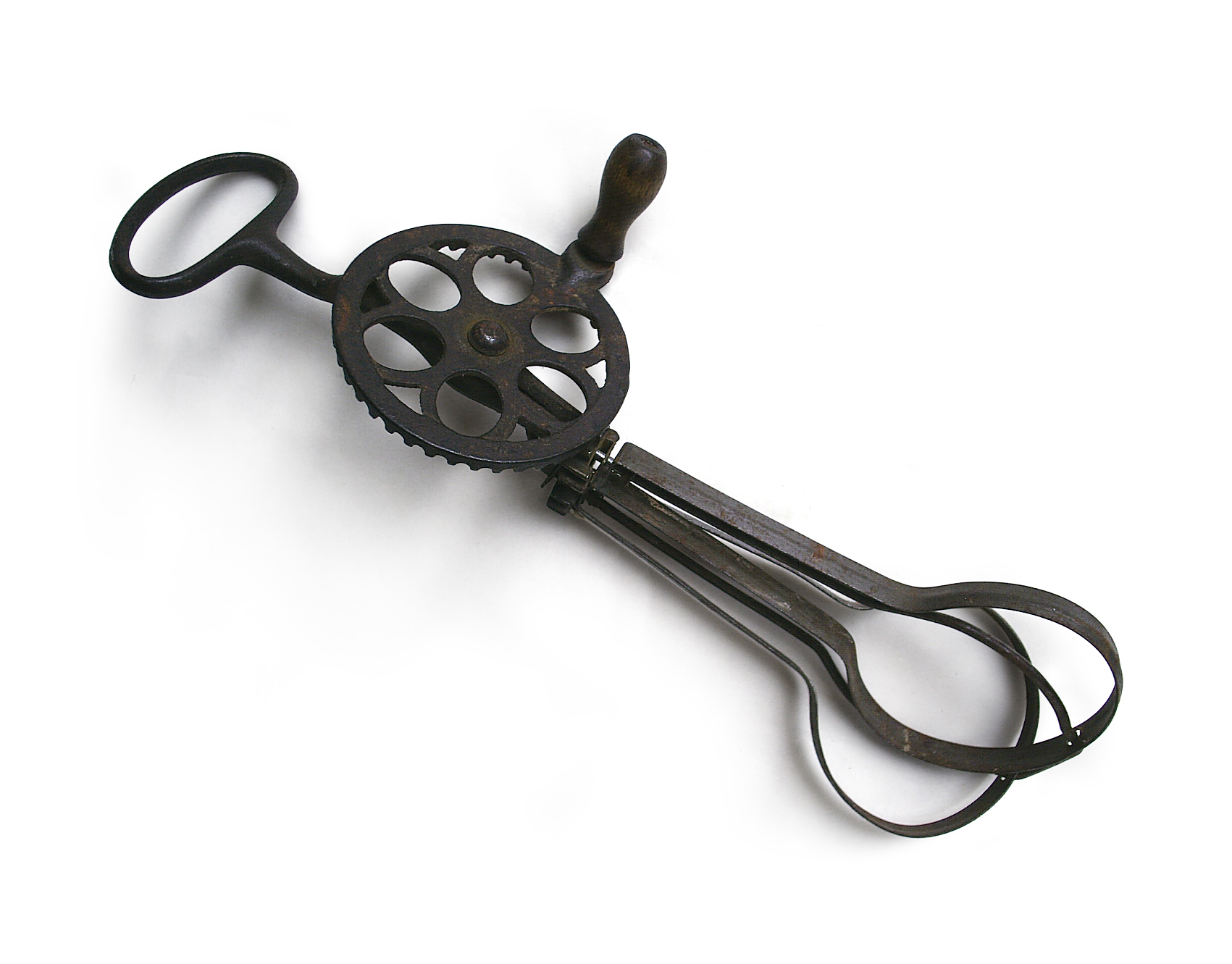
A vintage hand-cranked egg beater

An eggbeater is a handheld device with a crank on the side geared to one or more beaters. The user grips the handle with one hand and operates the crank with the other, creating the rotary action. An improved design was patented in 1859, by James F. and E.P. Monroe, of Fitchburg, Massachusetts.

=== Stand mixer ===
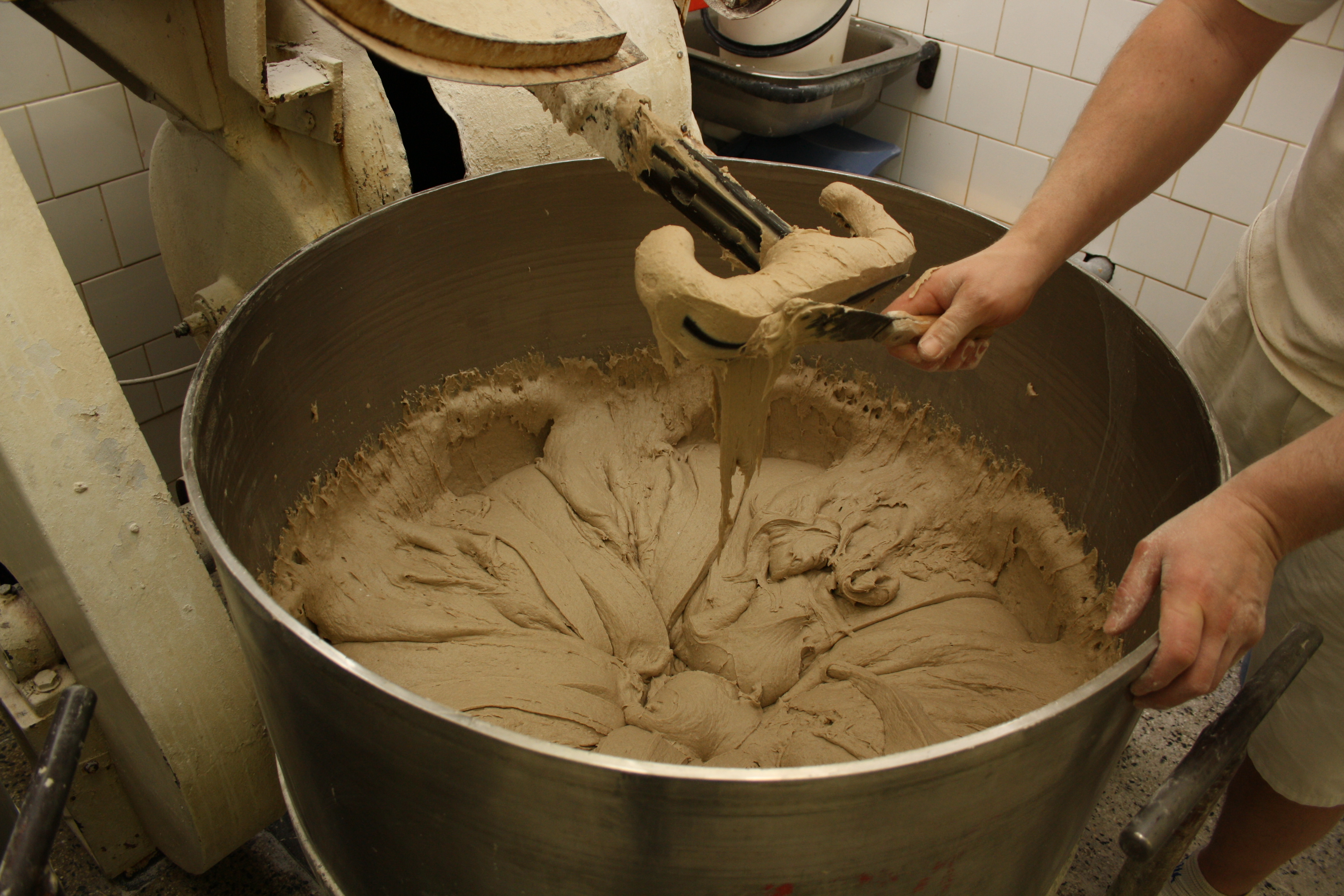
A large volume stand mixer used in a commercial bakery to mix bread dough with a double sided dough hook

A stand mixer in action on a home tabletop, with a wire whisk attachment

Stand mixers mount the motor driving the rotary action in a frame or stand which bears the weight of the device. Stand mixers are larger and have more powerful motors than their hand-held counterparts. They generally have a special bowl that is locked in place while the mixer is operating. A typical home stand mixer will include a wire whisk for whipping creams and egg whites; a flat beater for mixing batters; and a dough hook for kneading. Stand mixers are categorized as either spiral or planetary, based on whether or not the bowl is rotated.

Stand mixers are generally available in either counter top (also called bench) or floor models. Heavy duty commercial models can have bowl capacities well in excess of 25 US gallons (95 L) and weigh thousands of pounds (kilograms) but more typical home and light commercial models are equipped with bowls of around 1 US gal (3.8 L). Whether a mixer is a counter top or floor model depends on its size. Mixers that are 5 US gal (19 L) in size or smaller tend to be counter top mixers, while larger mixers tend to be floor models due to their size and weight.

==== Spiral vs. planetary stand mixers ====
Spiral mixers are specialist tools for mixing dough. A spiral-shaped agitator counter-rotates while the powered bowl spins in the opposite direction. This method enables spiral mixers to mix the same size dough batch much quicker and with less under-mixed dough than a similarly powered planetary mixer. Spiral mixers can mix dough with less agitator friction than planetary mixers. This allows the dough to be mixed without increasing its temperature, ensuring the dough can rise properly. Spiral mixers are preferred for thicker products, such as dough for pizza, bagels or naan bread.

Planetary mixers consist of a bowl and an agitator. The bowl remains static, whilst the agitator is rapidly moved around the bowl to mix its contents. With the ability to mix a wide variety of ingredients, planetary mixers are more versatile than their spiral counterparts. Planetary mixers can be used to whip and blend, whereas spiral mixers cannot.

=== Hand mixer ===
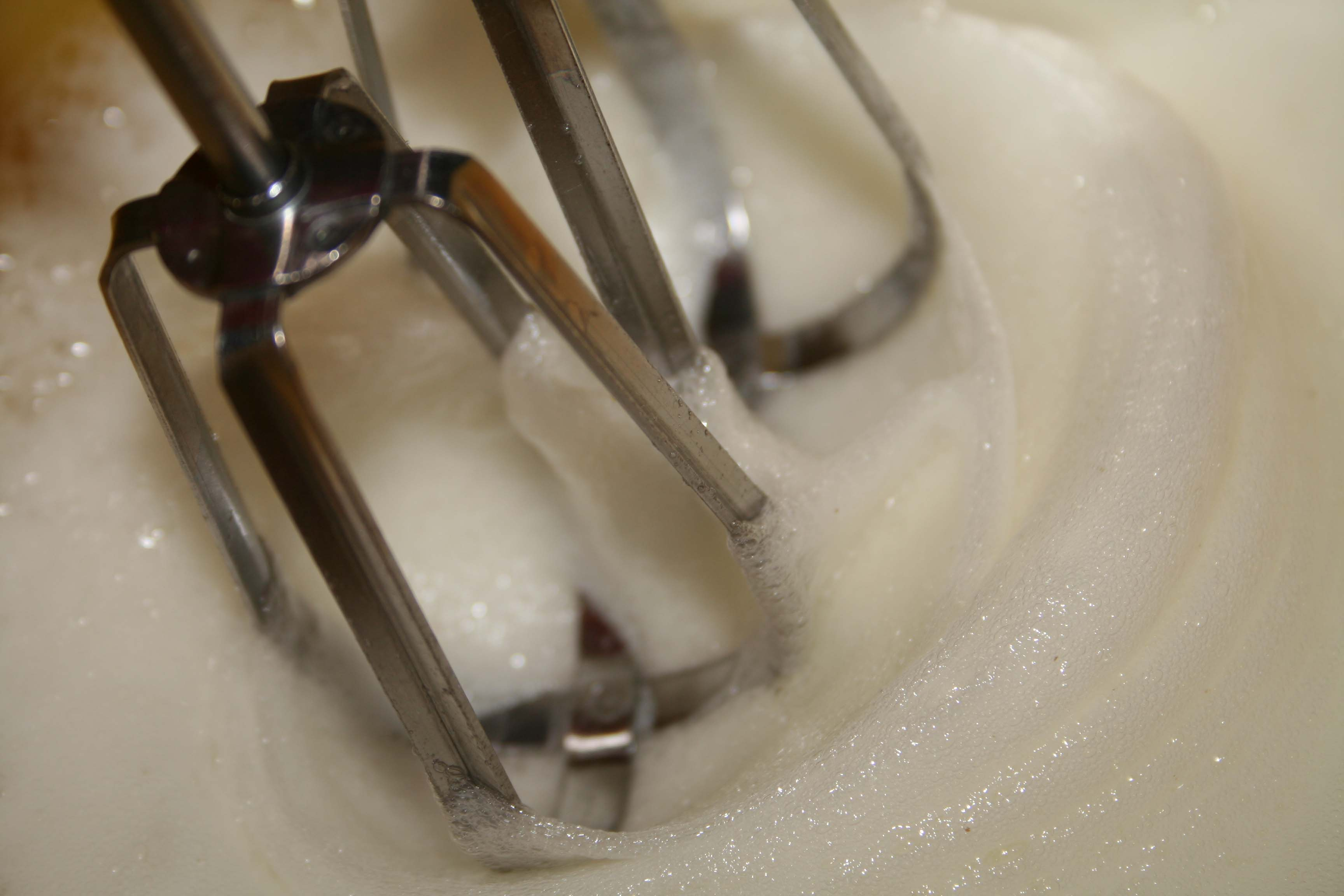
Whisking egg whites with a handheld electric mixer

A hand mixer is a hand-held mixing device. A handle is mounted over an enclosure containing the motor. The motor drives the beaters which are immersed in the food to perform the mixing action. The motor must be lightweight as it is supported by the user during use. The user may use any suitable kitchen container to hold the ingredients while mixing.

The first handheld electric mixer patent was submitted by Sunbeam Corporation in 1953 and granted in 1961.

=== Dough mixer ===
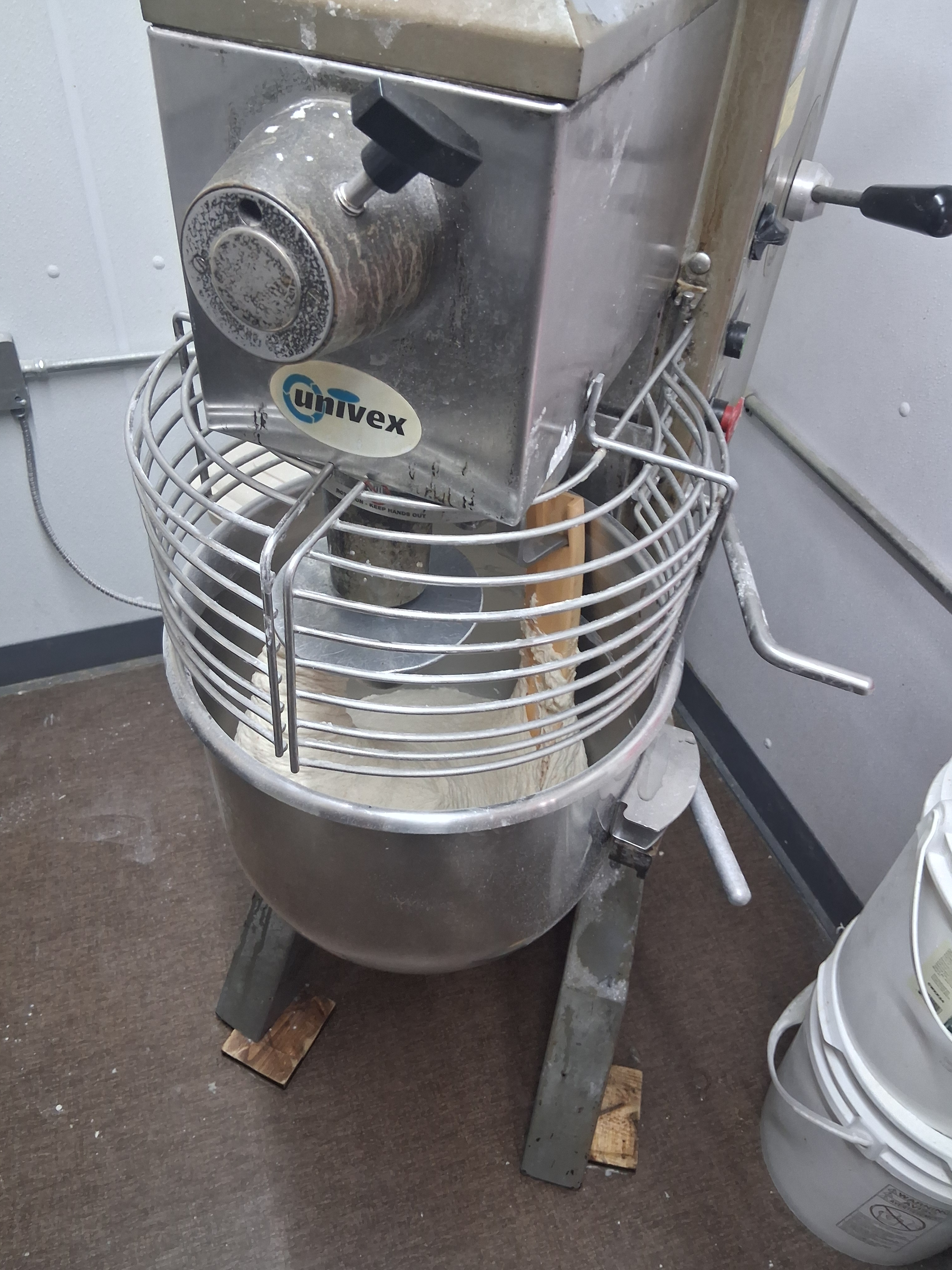
A commercial grade dough mixer

A dough mixer is used for household or industrial purposes. It is used for kneading large quantities of dough. It is electrical, having timers and various controls to suit the user's needs. Some features of dough blenders include high speed, low speed and bowl reverse (these can be combined into a programme) and a kneading bar in the centre of the bowl.

== See also ==
- Whisk, a manual kitchen utensil for mixing and whipping
- Industrial mixer
- Blender, an electric appliance with small blades at the bottom of a jar
- Milkshake machine, an electric appliance with a top-mounted agitator
- Dough scraper
- Pastry blender
- Kenwood Chef, a British food mixer
- Electrolux Ankarsrum Assistent, a Swedish made mixer that moves the bowl, not the implements
