= Jo-Bu =

Former Norwegian forestry-equipment manufacturer

Jo-Bu Mekaniske Verksted AS
- Industry: Forestry equipment
- Founded: 1947; 79 years ago
- Founders: Trygve Johnsen; Gunnar Busk
- Defunct: 2022
- Fate: Acquired by Electrolux; Drøbak factory closed
- Headquarters: Drøbak, Norway
- Products: Chainsaws
- Parent: Electrolux

Jo-Bu Mekaniske Verksted AS (Norwegian for "Jo-Bu Mechanical Workshop") in Drøbak, Norway, was a Norwegian industrial company. The factory produced forestry machines and tools and became especially known for producing the Jobu chainsaw. The firm produced chainsaws in the period 1948–1979.

The first saw, the "Jobu Senior," was designed by Trygve Johnsen and Gunnar Busk, and as new models followed, the Junior in particular is regarded as the biggest sales success. Jobu became the market leader in Norway and was exported in large numbers.

== History ==
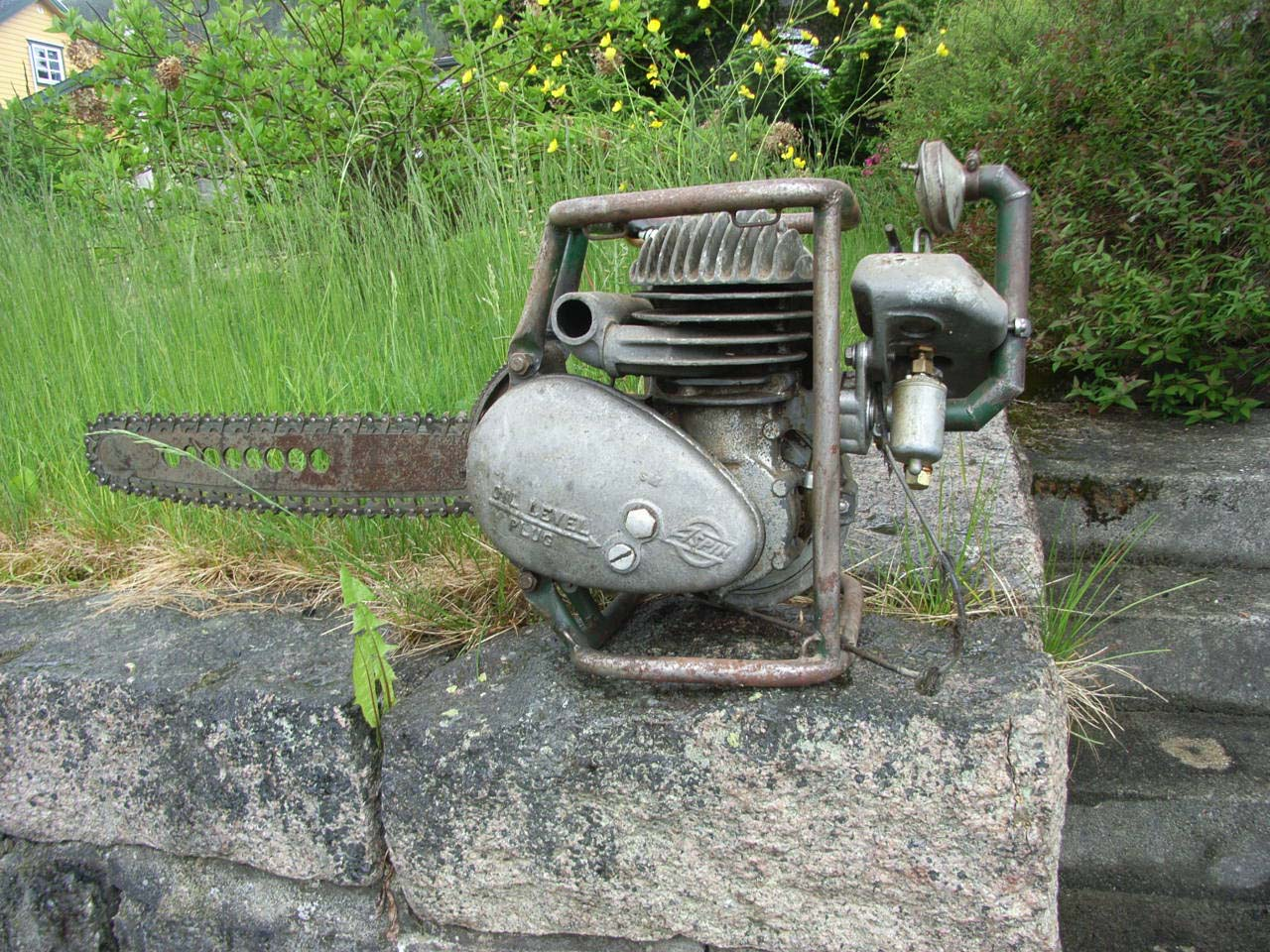
Jo-Bu Senior

Jo-Bu was founded in 1947 by the timber merchant Trygve Johnsen and the gunsmith Gunnar Busk, both from Nesodden. The first factory premises were at Fagerstrand on Nesodden, but in 1953 larger premises were needed, and the factory moved to the neighboring municipality of Frogn, to Sagaveien 13 in Drøbak.

Johnsen and Busk were themselves responsible for the construction of the first commercial chainsaw, the "Jo-Bu Senior," which had an "Aspin" engine with a standard carburetor with float chamber. Whenever the saw was placed on its side, the carburetor had to be rotated accordingly. Jo-Bu Senior weighed 17.5 kg and was only applicable for felling and bucking.

The next model was the Junior, released on the market in 1952. The engine in the Junior was manufactured by Jo-Bu themselves. The Junior came with its predecessor's carburetor solution that still had to be rotated, but the weight was reduced to 10.4 kg. This saw became very popular, and around 40,000 units were produced. The Jo-Bu Tiger, which came in 1960, was a major advance, with a diaphragm carburetor that worked in all positions.

Jo-Bu was for a long time the market leader in Norway, and in the latter half of the 1960s and in the 1970s Jo-Bu saws were also exported to various countries in Europe and even the United States. Jo-Bu produced several different options for their chainsaws; best known is a propeller that converted the chainsaw to an outboard motor, available for both the Senior and the Junior, and they also produced an auger for the Junior Tiger.

The Jobu group was expanded in 1959 with the Larvik company Istral, which produced trailers and transport equipment for forestry. In 1967 the founders wanted to scale back, while the company needed to strengthen its finances to invest more in exports, and the solution was found by Christiania Spigerverk taking over the share majority and placing its own people in the daily management, the founders keeping board seats and a continued role as technical consultants for new products. When the Spigerverk merged with Elkem to form Elkem Spigerverket in 1971, the Jobu group also became part of the group.

In April 1979 Jo-Bu was sold to Electrolux, which already controlled chainsaw production through its ownership of Husqvarna, Partner, and Jonsered, as well as Skil in the United States. The aim was structural rationalization, and although both the old and new owners promised in the newspapers that the jobs would be secured, the number of jobs nonetheless fell gradually from 185 in 1979 to 57 at the start of 1982. The employees in Drøbak feared full closure and were proved right: in January 1982 the board of Electrolux decided to gather all Norwegian production at the Tunborg factory near Sarpsborg, the former KPS/Husqvarna stove factory that Electrolux had acquired when it took over Husqvarna in 1977.

The Jobu brand was continued for some years on chainsaws made in Sweden with parts from the factory in Sarpsborg, which produced chainsaw bars for all the group's factories. This last Norwegian production was closed in 2022.
