= A. Gulowsens Motorfabrikk =

Norwegian engine manufacturer

- Company type: Engine manufacturer
- Industry: Engines, machinery
- Founded: 1889
- Defunct: 1933
- Fate: Destroyed by fire
- Headquarters: Oslo, Norway
- Key people: Anders Gulowsen, Wilhelm Gulowsen
- Products: Engines, machine equipment

A. Gulowsens Motorfabrikk was an engine factory in Oslo started by Anders Gulowsen (1869–1935) in 1889, when he was 20 years old and newly graduated from the Oslo Commerce School. It began as a machine agency, with the Danish Alpha as its main product. When his brother Wilhelm joined the business in 1897 with an engineering education from Oslo and Germany, the agency was expanded into an engine factory.

== History ==
In 1909 a large engine factory was built at Rodeløkka, where Alpha engines were produced under license alongside the company's own engines and machine equipment. In 1911 Gulowsen took over the machine and workshop division of Sandberg & Simonsen, which had dealt among other things in printing equipment.

The engineer Wilhelm Gulowsen (1874–1952), Anders Gulowsen's younger brother, joined the factory in 1897 after completing his engineering education in Oslo (OTS) and Germany, and it may have been then that the company became an engine factory. Wilhelm also held central positions in the Mechanical Workshops' National Federation and the Norwegian Employers' Association.

The factory burned in 1933 and did not resume operation afterward. The car dealership Colberg Caspary took over the building and moved part of its workshops there from farther up Gøteborggata, and the shoe factory Amulet then became the building's main tenant until it closed in 1962.

== Gulowsens Motorverksted ==
Gulowsen started an agency and workshop at Vaterland, Gulowsens Motorverksted, to service and follow up earlier customers and deliveries and to produce some machine parts. The buildings were demolished in the early 1970s to make way for the new Oslo Central Station and the Postgiro Building.
