= Tappan (brand) =

American appliance brand

- Tappan

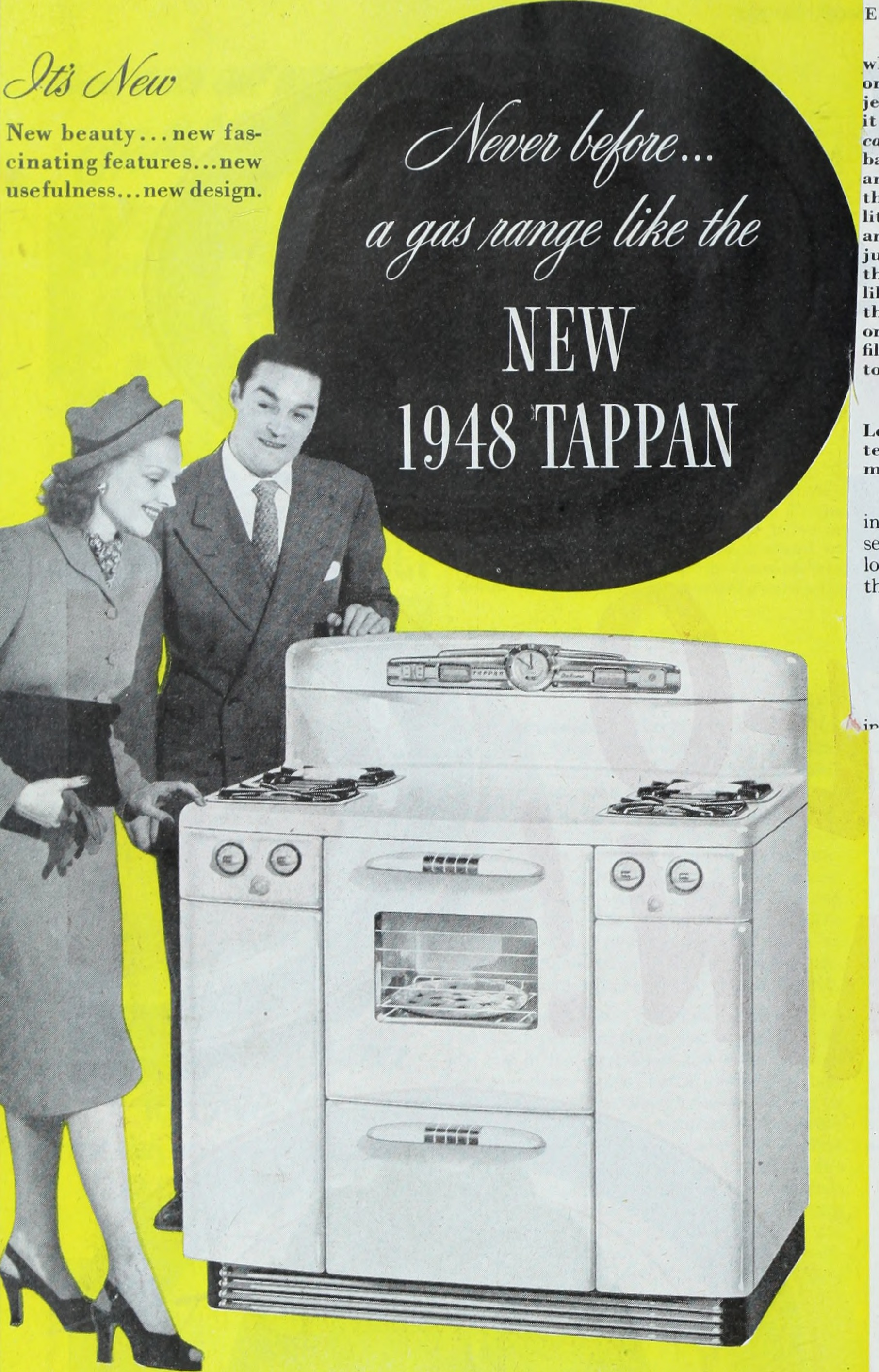
- Tappan gas range (1948 advertisement)
- Product type: Appliances
- Current owner: Electrolux
- Introduced: 1881; 145 years ago

Tappan is a brand of appliances, named after company founder W. J. Tappan.

Tappan claimed several innovations:

- 1930s all-porcelain range available in various colors
- 1955 the first compact (24") microwave oven
- 1960s electric ignition for gas ranges
- 1965 single-unit conventional range and microwave oven

== History ==
In 1881, Tappan appliances was founded by W.J. Tappan as the Ohio Valley Foundry Company in Bellaire, Ohio, initially selling cast-iron stoves door-to-door.

In 1889, the company relocated to Mansfield, Ohio, and was renamed the Eclipse Stove Company, when Tappan's father, who was an amateur astronomer, suggested the name after traveling to Siberia to view a comet. However, due to the existence of another Eclipse Stove Company that was not affiliated with Tappan's company, the company was renamed the Tappan Stove Company in the 1920s.

In 1950, Tappan acquired the Los Angeles-based O'Keefe & Merritt Stove Company and used the O'Keefe & Merritt name in the western United States from then until the late 1980s.

In 1978, Carl Icahn in his first takeover attempt took a controlling stake in Tappan and forced the sale of the company to Electrolux

In 1979, European-based AB Electrolux (which had purchased Eureka five years prior) purchased the Tappan Stove Company. Seven years later, AB Electrolux purchased White Consolidated Industries, which manufactured Frigidaire, White-Westinghouse, Gibson Appliance, and Kelvinator products, and combined its Tappan holdings with these new products to create the WCI Major Appliances Group. In 1991, the WCI Major Appliances Group simply became known as the Frigidaire Company, based in Dublin Ohio.

In 1997, the North American division of Electrolux was reorganized as Electrolux Home Products of North America, consolidating American Yard Products, Frigidaire, and Poulan/Weedeater.

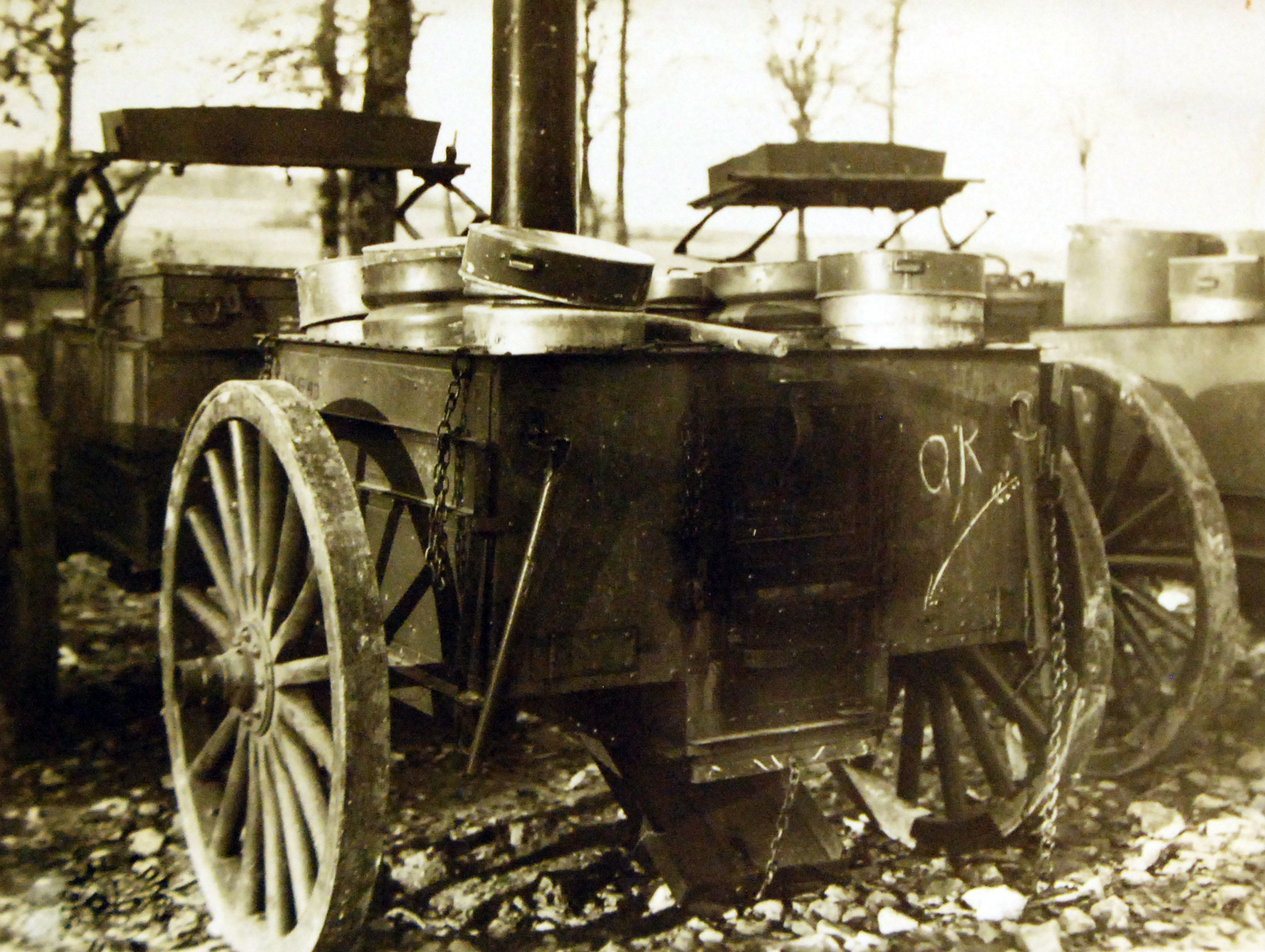
Taylor Rolling Kitchen in France, 1918, which was manufactured by Eclipse Stove Company
