= Frigidaire St. Cloud plant =

American Frigidaire company

- Operated: 1946–2019
- Location: 701 33rd Avenue North; St. Cloud, Minnesota, United States
- Coordinates: 45°33′51″N 94°12′0″W
- Industry: Home appliances
- Products: chest freezers; upright freezers
- Employees: 900 (2018)
- Area: 50 acres (20 ha)
- Volume: 920,000 square feet (85,000 m^{2})
- Owner: Electrolux

Frigidaire St. Cloud plant was a Frigidaire appliance manufacturing plant in St. Cloud, Minnesota, owned by Electrolux. The facility was closed in 2019.

== History ==
=== Early years and growth ===
The plant was originally opened in November 1946 by Franklin Transformer Company (later becoming part of Franklin Manufacturing) as a small, 75,000-square-foot shop with just 20 employees making battery chargers and deep-freeze units. In 1947, it employed 385 workers and invested $200,000 to double working space.

In June 1955, the facility incorporated as Franklin Manufacturing Company, employing approximately 1,175 workers to produce chest freezers, upright freezers, refrigerators, and dryers across more than 500,000 square feet of workspace. In 1962, the facility, along with the company, was sold by the Pugh family to the Studebaker Corporation, and produced private-name appliances like colorful freezers and refrigerators. In 1967, Franklin Manufacturing was acquired by White Consolidated Industries.

In 1979, WCI acquired the Frigidaire division from General Motors, which boosted operations across its appliance manufacturing footprint. The following year in July 1980, robotics were introduced to handle tasks like painting freezer liners at the St. Cloud facility. In 1986, WCI, including its St. Cloud plant, was acquired by Electrolux.

In October 1992, the plant temporarily laid off 130 workers through the end of the year to adjust production for new federal energy efficiency regulations, with plans to rehire them. By 1994, the facility employees 1,600 workers at its peak, manufacturing approximately 65 percent of all freezers purchased in the U.S., reaching roughly 75 percent of U.S. freezers by 1998.

=== Decline ===
In November 2000, over 1,600 workers represented by the Machinists Union went on strike over health benefits and medical premium freezes. In 2003, the plant voluntarily resolved a discrimination complaint brought by 165 Muslim employees regarding religious accommodations for prayer breaks. In November 2004, Electrolux moved production of a compact chest freezer from its manufacturing plant in St. Cloud, Minnesota, to China; at the time, the plant has 1,700 workers to produce upright and chest freezers.

The U.S. Equal Employment Opportunity Commission (EEOC) settled a lawsuit in November 2008 requiring a Minnesota chicken processor to pay $215,000 to Somali Muslim workers fired for taking prayer breaks. In 2010, the plant faced a dispute regarding religious accommodations. Rather than forcing employees, the plant faced complaints and an Equal Employment Opportunity Commission (EEOC) filing over break schedules during Ramadan.

In 2015, Electrolux stopped producing small chest freezers in St. Cloud, and in the following year, production of large chest freezers was also stopped at the facility.

=== Closure and sale to Phoenix Investors ===
In January 2018, Electrolux announced that it will close the St. Cloud, Minnesota, manufacturing plant by 2019, and lay off approximately 900 employees at the plant, shifting upright freezer production to a facility in Anderson, South Carolina. The plant closed in November 2019, idling the final group of roughly 700 to 900 employees represented by IAM Local 623.

On October 3, 2023, the facility was sold to Phoenix Investors, a Milwaukee-based real estate firm.
