= Frigidaire Greenville plant =

Coordinates: 43°11′12″N 85°15′46″W

- Operated: 1892–2006
- Location: 635 West Charles Street; Greenville, Michigan, United States
- Industry: Home appliances
- Products: top-freezer refrigerators; side-by-side refrigerators
- Employees: 2,700 (2004)
- Volume: 1,700,000 square feet (160,000 m^{2})
- Owner: Electrolux

Frigidaire Greenville plant was a Frigidaire appliance manufacturing plant in Greenville, Michigan, owned by Electrolux. The Greenville factory was the largest refrigerator plant in North America at the time, producing up to 1.6 million units a year under brands like Frigidaire, Kenmore, and Kelvinator. The plant was closed in 2006.

== History ==
The physical factory originally dates back to 1892, when the Ranney Refrigerator Company was founded, manufacturing wooden iceboxes using local hardwoods and establishing Greenville as the "Refrigerator Capital of the World". In 1908, the Gibson Refrigerator Company was established in Greenville, later growing to be the largest independent appliance manufacturer.

In 1967, White Consolidated Industries acquired Gibson Appliance. In March 1986, Swedish appliance manufacturer AB Electrolux acquired White Consolidated Industries, including the plant in Greenville, Michigan. In October 2003, Electrolux announced that the plant was under evaluation.

In January 2004, Electrolux announced it would close its Greenville, Michigan, refrigerator manufacturing plant by November 2005, terminating 2,700 workers. Despite local and state incentives, the company opted to relocate production to Juarez, Mexico, to capitalize on lower labor costs, aiming to save roughly $81 million annually. The plant was closed on March 3, 2006, shifting production to a new facility in Juarez, Mexico.
