= Frigidaire Springfield plant =

- Built: 1974
- Operated: 1974–present
- Location: 1100 Industrial Drive; Springfield, Tennessee, United States
- Coordinates: 36°30′0″N 86°52′9″W
- Industry: Home appliances
- Products: gas ranges; electric ranges; wall ovens
- Employees: 2,900
- Volume: 1,200,000 square feet (110,000 m^{2})
- Owner: Electrolux

Frigidaire Springfield plant is a Frigidaire appliance manufacturing plant in Springfield, Tennessee, owned by Electrolux.

== History ==
The plant was built in 1974 by General Motors, which sold the plant (along with the brand) to White Consolidated Industries in 1979. In March 1986, Swedish appliance manufacturer AB Electrolux acquired White Consolidated Industries, including the plant in Springfield, Tennessee.

A $5 million, 21,000-square-foot developmental and laboratory addition was constructed in 2011 to handle testing and quality control, creating 75 technical jobs.

In early 2018, the company announced a monumental $250 million investment to expand and modernize the 600,000-square-foot facility into its central U.S. cooking products hub. The $250 million upgrade involved modernizing production and adding roughly 400,000 square feet of manufacturing space. By the end of the decade, the site was Robertson County's largest employer, steadily growing to around 2,900 workers to support massive assembly operations.

In 2020, the plant absorbed operations from a shuttered facility in Memphis, Tennessee. A 525,000-square-foot warehouse was opened in 2021.
