= Frigidaire Kinston plant =

American company

- Built: 1989
- Operated: 1989–present
- Location: 4850 West Vernon Avenue; Kinston, North Carolina, United States
- Coordinates: 35°15′54″N 77°39′53″W
- Industry: Home appliances
- Products: dishwashers
- Employees: 870 (2005)
- Volume: 500,000 square feet (46,000 m^{2})
- Owner: Electrolux

Frigidaire Kinston plant is a Frigidaire appliance manufacturing plant in Kinston, North Carolina, owned by Electrolux.

== History ==
The factory was built and opened on October 23, 1989 by White Consolidated Industries (which was a subsidiary of Electrolux) to manufacture 24-inch plastic tub dishwashers.

In September 2005, Electrolux invested $18 million to expand its Kinston dishwasher plant, adding a new line of stainless steel dishwashers and create 97 new jobs over three years.

In 2012, the plant launched award-winning models like the Frigidaire Gallery Orbit Clean dishwasher. The plant celebrated its 25th anniversary in October 2014, and its 30th anniversary in 2019.

In late 2025, Electrolux announced a $23 million expansion to add stainless steel tub manufacturing lines slated for 2027. The expansion will add 74 jobs, as well as the 30,000-square-foot expansion to its existing 463,000 square feet (43,000 m^{2}) facility.
