= White Hall (Daytona Beach, Florida) =

- U.S. National Register of Historic Places
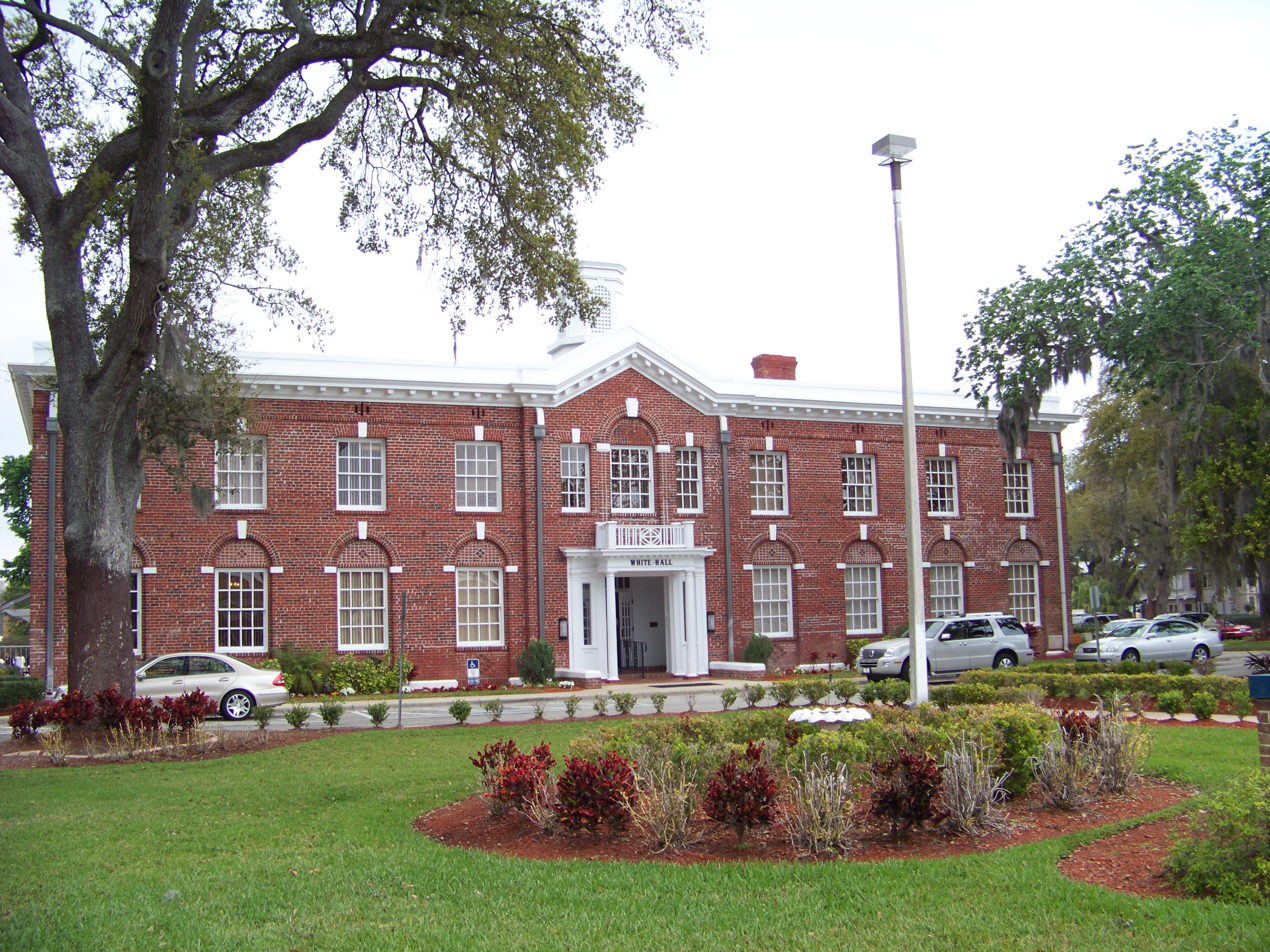

- Location within Volusia County
- Location: Daytona Beach, Florida
- Coordinates: 29°12′43″N 81°1′57″W
- Architectural style: Bungalow/Craftsman, Colonial Revival
- NRHP reference No.: 92001617
- Added to NRHP: July 15, 1992

White Hall is a historic site on the campus of Bethune-Cookman University in Daytona Beach, Florida, United States. It is located at 640 Mary McLeod Bethune Boulevard (formerly 2nd Avenue). On July 15, 1992, it was added to the U.S. National Register of Historic Places.

== History ==
White Hall is named after Thomas H. White, founder of the White Sewing Machine Company. Mr. White met Mary McLeod Bethune while vacationing in Florida. He became a trustee of the school (then known as the Daytona Educational and Industrial Training School) and financial supporter. White Hall was built in 1915 with classroom and office spaces. It closed in 2010 for renovations, and it reopened and was rededicated in August 2012. White Hall houses Bethune-Cookman University's president's suite and administrative offices.

== Gallery ==
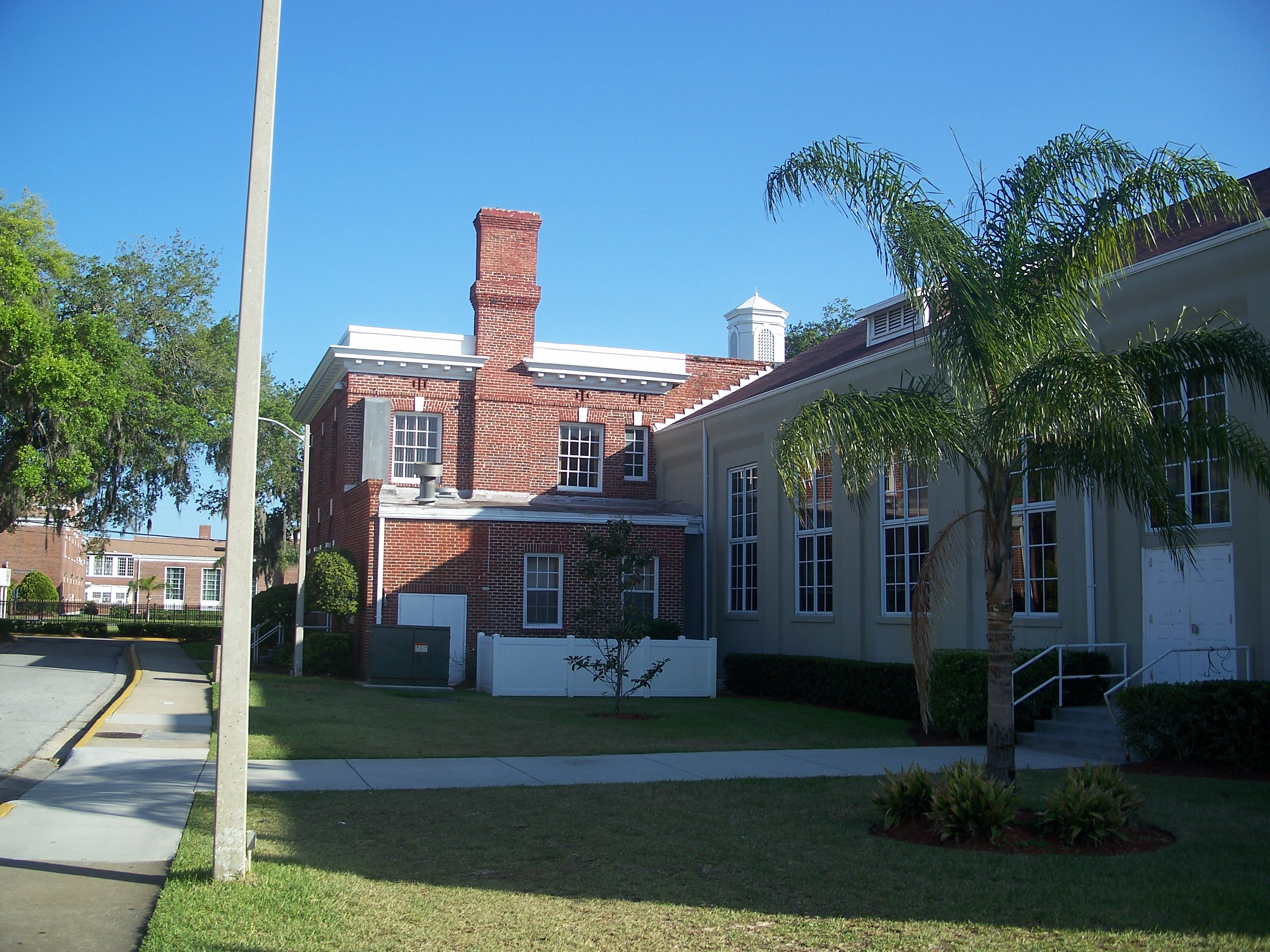
Back of building

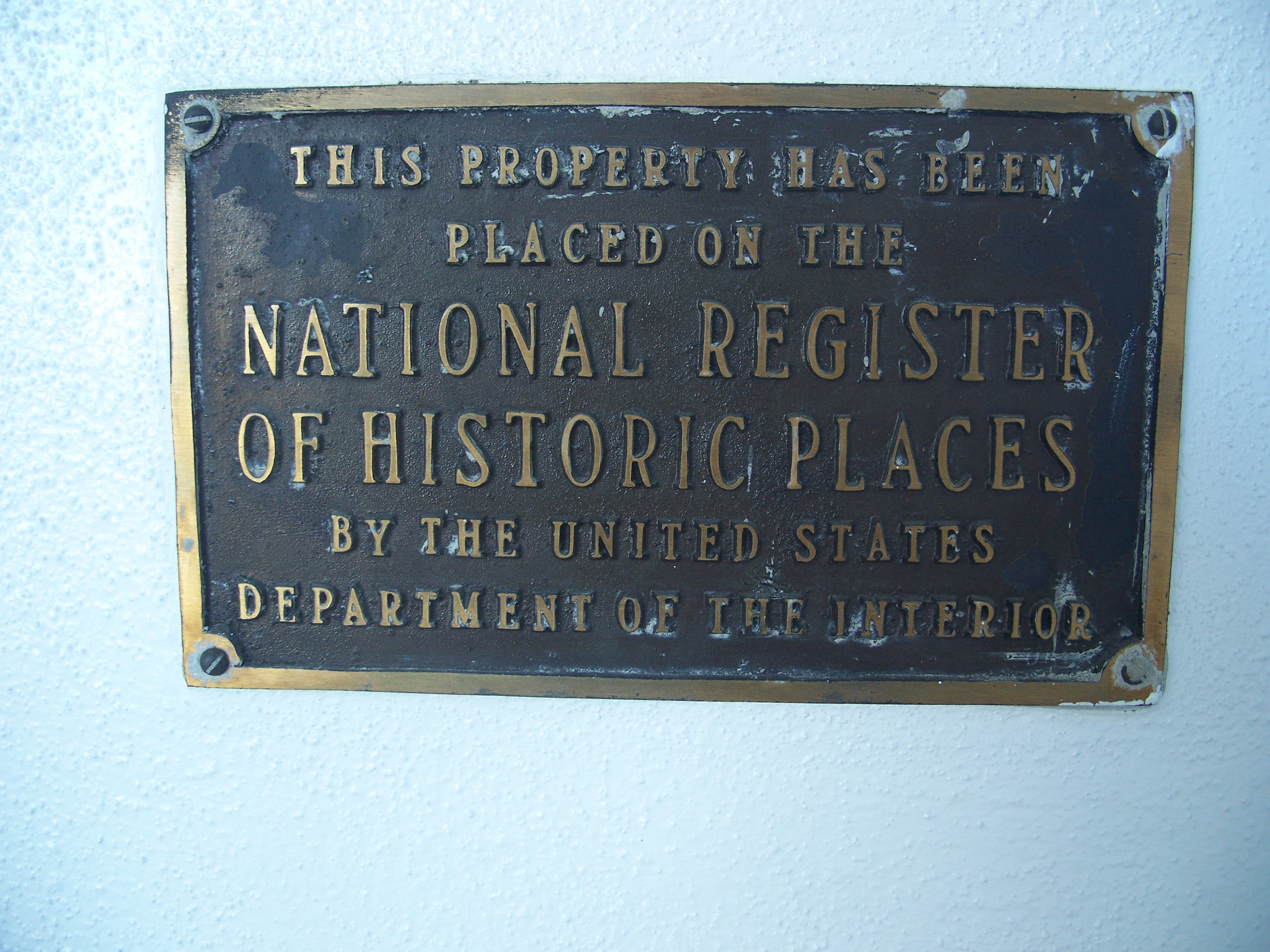
National Register of Historic Places plaque

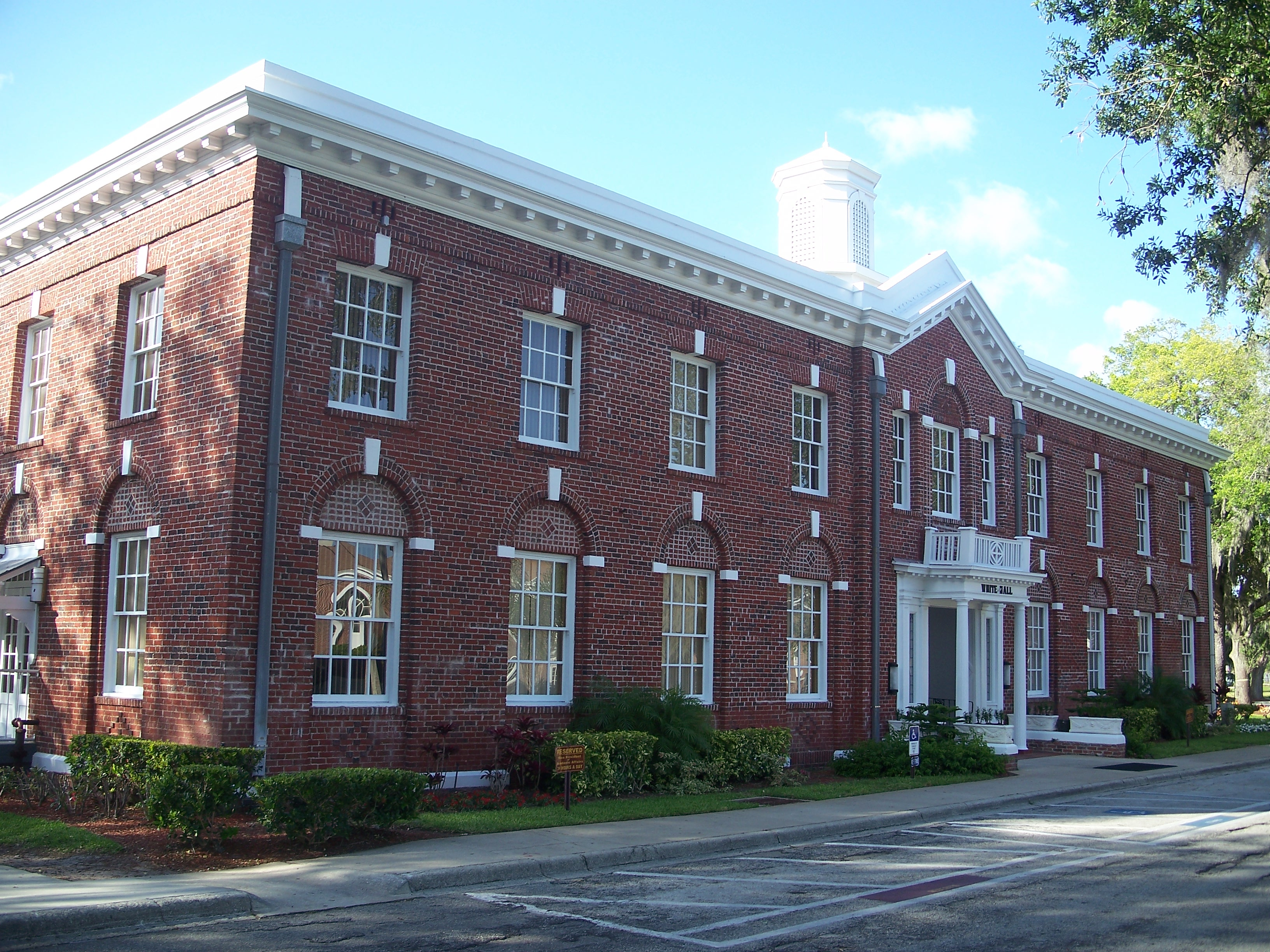

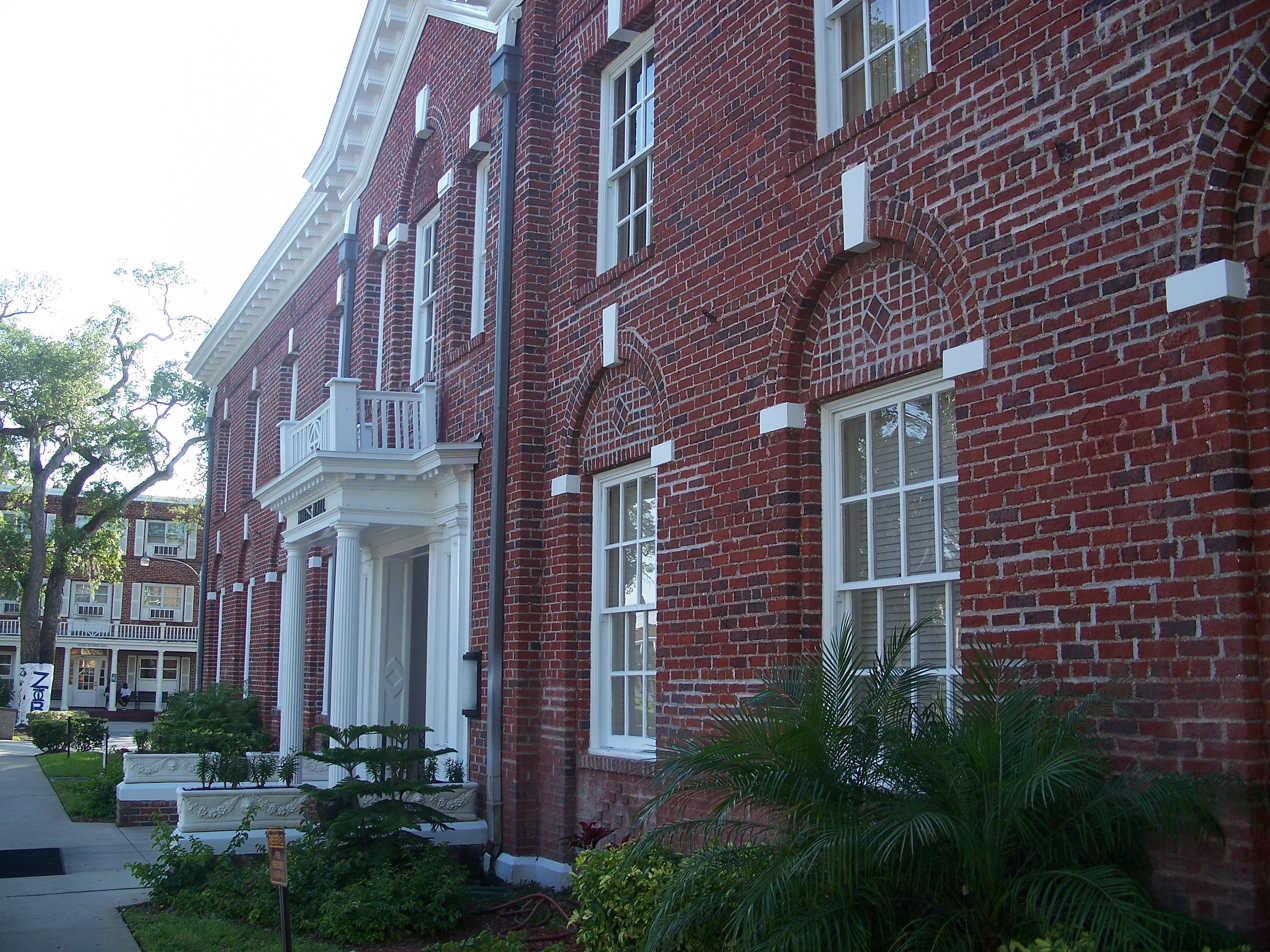
