= Frigidaire Webster City plant =

- Operated: 1937–2011
- Location: 400 Des Moines Street; Webster City, Iowa, United States
- Coordinates: 42°28′22″N 93°49′11″W
- Industry: Home appliances
- Products: top-load washing machines; front-load washing machines; clothes dryers
- Employees: 2,000
- Area: 69 acres (28 ha)
- Volume: 970,000 square feet (90,000 m^{2})
- Owner: Electrolux

Frigidaire Webster City plant was a Frigidaire appliance manufacturing plant in Webster City, Iowa, owned by Electrolux.

== History ==
The plant was opened on October 13, 1937 as the Beam Manufacturing Company, which originally produced washing machines and the famous "Doodlebug" scooters. Later in 1956, Beam Manufacturing was sold to the Franklin Manufacturing Company of Minneapolis, Minnesota, which was later acquired by White Consolidated Industries in 1967 for approximately $21 million.

In March 1986, Swedish appliance manufacturer AB Electrolux acquired White Consolidated Industries, including the plant in Webster City, Iowa.

In early 2006, Electrolux announced that it will shift front-load washer and tumble-dryer production from Webster City, Iowa, to a new plant in Juarez, Mexico. The Juarez, Mexico plant was opened in 2008.

In October 2009, Electrolux announced that it will close the Webster City, Iowa, laundry manufacturing plant by early 2011, terminating 850 workers, along with another 50 in a smaller, satellite plant in Jefferson, Iowa to be closed by late 2010. The Webster City plant closed on March 31, 2011, resulting in 500 job losses and shifting production to Juarez, Mexico.

In November 2012, Electrolux announced it would shutter the last research and development and testing operations at its former Webster City, Iowa, laundry plant by 2013, eliminating 80 jobs and shifting development to its North American headquarters in Charlotte, North Carolina.
