= Frigidaire Edison plant =

- Operated: 1951–2003
- Location: 2170 State Route 27; Edison, New Jersey, United States
- Coordinates: 40°31′40″N 74°22′52″W
- Industry: Home appliances
- Products: Air conditioners
- Employees: 1,350 (2002)
- Area: 50 acres (20 ha)
- Volume: 400,000 square feet (37,000 m^{2})
- Owner: Electrolux

Frigidaire Edison plant was a Frigidaire appliance manufacturing plant in Edison, New Jersey, owned by Electrolux. The facility was closed in 2003.

== History ==
The factory was built in 1951, and was originally operated by Westinghouse. The Westinghouse appliance division was acquired by White Consolidated Industries in 1975, and in 1986, the company (including its AC plant in Edison) was sold to Electrolux.

In December 2002, Electrolux announced it targeted its Edison, New Jersey, room air conditioner manufacturing plant for closure by 2003, shifting production offshore to countries like China, India, Brazil, and Europe. In early 2003, IUE-CWA reported that more than 1,600 workers at the 51-year old plant will lose their jobs in July of the year. The plant closed in July 2003, terminating approximately 1,350 workers.

In July 2017, plans were announced to redevelop the 900,000-square-foot vacant property into an Amazon fulfillment center.
