= Windsor Holden White =

American polo player

Windsor Holden White (18 July 1905 – 8 March 1976) was an American polo player.

== Biography ==
=== Early life ===
White was born in Cuyahoga County, Ohio, the son of Windsor T. White and Delia Holden of Chagrin Falls, Ohio. He was a scion of the prominent White family of Ohio who made a fortune in the auto industry.

=== Polo ===
In 1941, he competed in the U.S. Open Polo Championship as part of the Westbury team, together with Gerald Dempsey, Earle Hopping and Stewart Iglehart. However, they lost to the Gulfstream team (John H. H. Phipps, Michael Grace Phipps, Charles Skiddy von Stade and Alan L. Corey, Jr.).

After he moved to England, he became a patron of the Polo Cottage team.

The Holden White Qualifying Matches at the Guards Polo Club and the Holden White Cup at the Cowdray Park Polo Club are named in his honour.

=== Personal life ===
He married Jean Stevenson Graves in New Jersey in 1930. During the Second World War, he was working in England with the U.S. Office of Censorship. He married secondly Jean Kathleen Mary Fielding, widow of Lt. Hugh Neville Clegg, and daughter of Sir Charles William Fielding (1863–1941; a descendant of the 3rd Earl of Denbigh) and Florence Dixon, on 12 July 1944. They resided at Polo Cottage in Midhurst, West Sussex, England where he died in 1976.
