= O'Keefe and Merritt =

Los Angeles-based appliance company (1920–1980s)

O'Keefe and Merritt Manufacturing Company
- Company type: Defunct
- Industry: Appliance
- Founded: 1922
- Fate: closed down: late 1990s (approx.)
- Headquarters: Los Angeles, California, United States
- Products: gas ranges, electric ranges, built-in gas cooktops and ovens, refrigerators, dishwashers

and gas heaters

O'Keefe and Merritt (often written as O'Keefe & Merritt) was a Los Angeles-based appliance company. Their gas ranges and stand-alone ovens were particularly popular in Southern California in the middle of the 20th Century.

== History ==
O'Keefe and Merritt Manufacturing Company began operations in Los Angeles in 1920. In 1950, Tappan purchased the company in a $5 million transaction, but management remained in Los Angeles and the company continued to produce 500-600 ranges each day.

The reputation for high quality that the company enjoyed is shown by the December 1951 purchase by Stanley Marcus of Neiman Marcus fame of an Aristocrat for his wife, which he had shipped from Los Angeles by air.

The company brand also appeared on microwave ovens, which were manufactured by Litton. In 1970, the company faced labor issues, but Tappan claimed they had been largely resolved by October of that year.

== Features ==
=== Cooktop stove oven ===
Stove features included the "Grillevator," designed for broiling large items like hams or turkeys. The Automatic Burner Control (A.B.C.) allowed chefs to set the burners to turn off after a particular amount of time. The large Aristocrat model featured three ovens and two broilers, weighing 734 pounds (333 kg).

In 1960, a built-in barbecue unit could be added to a cooktop. By 1964, all O'Keefe and Merritt electric ovens had built-in clocks that could be used to turn on the oven, cook for a certain time, and then turn off the oven. In 1965, O'Keefe and Merritt sold, among other models, a 36-inch (910 mm) range and a 21-inch-wide (530 mm) oven. The deluxe versions of these products included a warming feature which kept food at 170 °F (77 °C) until serving. In 1967, the company sold Teflon-coated ovens.

=== Dishwasher ===
The 1962 built-in dishwasher featured an "alternating roller impeller" designed to better distribute water throughout the machine.

== See also ==
- List of stoves
