= Thomas H. White =

Cleveland, Ohio industrialist and philanthropist

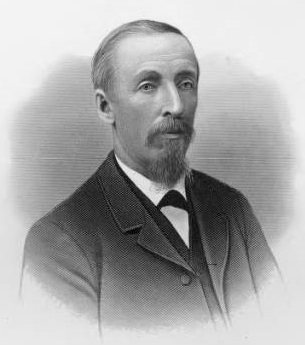
- 1885 lithograph of White
- Born: Thomas Howard White; April 26, 1836; Phillipston, Massachusetts
- Died: June 22, 1914 (aged 78); Cleveland, Ohio
- Resting place: Lake View Cemetery
- Known for: Founding the White Sewing Machine Co.
- Spouse: Almira Louisa Greenleaf (m. 1858; died 1900)
- Children: 8, including Windsor

Signature
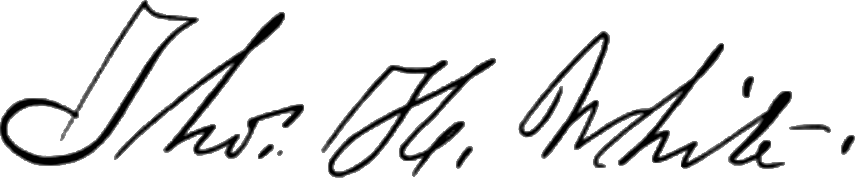

Thomas Howard White (April 26, 1836 – June 22, 1914) was an American industrialist and philanthropist. In 1876 he founded the White Sewing Machine Company in Cleveland, Ohio, predecessor of White Consolidated Industries.

He was also an automotive pioneer through the White Motor Company, which went on to produce cars, trucks, buses and tractors. In 1913 he established the Thomas H. White Charitable Trust, which is still active as the Thomas H. White Foundation.

== Early life and education ==
Thomas Howard White was born in Phillipston, Massachusetts, the oldest of eight children, to Windsor and Betsey Pierce White. He only had a basic education, however he also had a strong mechanical aptitude.

== Career ==
He invented a small hand-operated single-thread sewing machine, and marketed it as "The New England Sewing Machine" through a company formed in Templeton, Massachusetts with partner William Grothe.

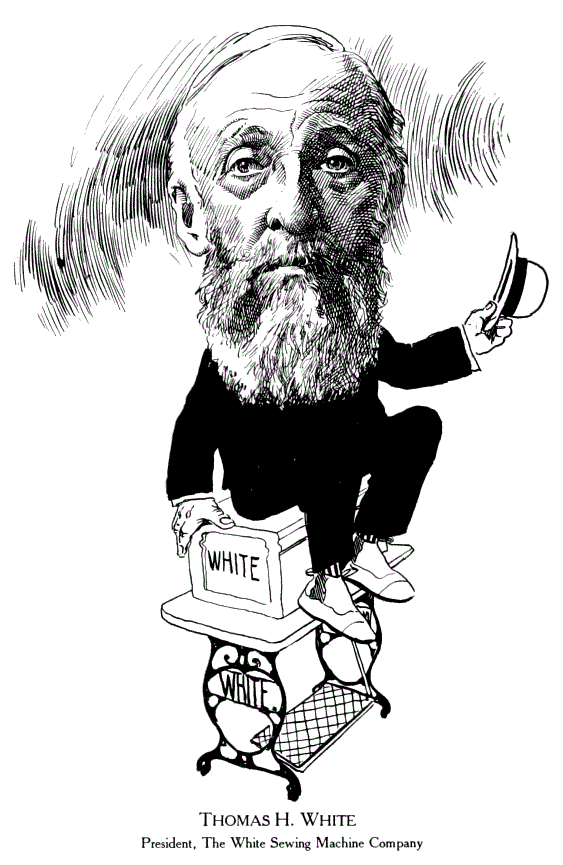
1904 caricature

In 1866 he moved to Cleveland, Ohio and founded the White Manufacturing Co., which was followed in 1876 by the formation with William L. Grout of the White Sewing Machine Company, with White as president and treasurer. His company helped make a Cleveland a center for sewing machine manufacture, and set up branch dealers throughout the United States and in England. White also served on Cleveland City Council from 1875-1876. He married Almira L. Greenleaf of Boston on November 2, 1858 and they had eight children.

From the beginnings in sewing machines, White extended his operations into a number of different areas. A sideline department making roller skates was expanded into The Cleveland Machine Screw Co. which in turn became the Cleveland Automatic Machine Co. A bicycle department was created that was eventually sold to The American Bicycle Company. He also was involved in manufacturing motor vehicles beginning in 1906 through the White Motor Company, although operations were primarily overseen by three of his sons, Windsor, Rollin and Walter. White was acquired by Volvo in 1980 during bankruptcy proceedings. In 1988, Volvo-White merged with GMC to create a line of trucks called WhiteGMC. The WhiteGMC brand continued to be used up until 1996.

== Philanthropy ==
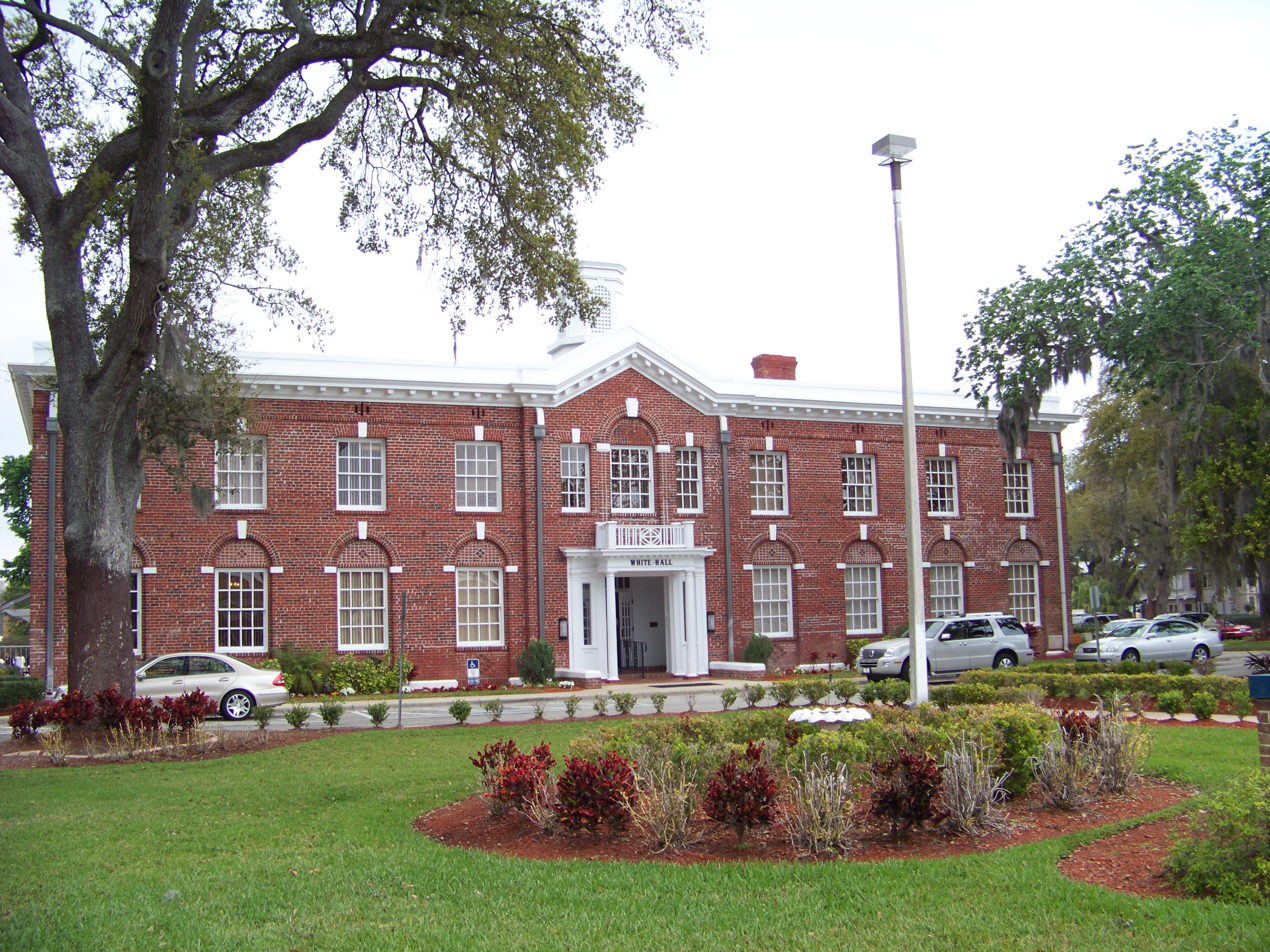
White Hall at Bethune–Cookman University was named after Thomas H. White in recognition of his financial support.

In the early 1900s Mary McLeod Bethune founded, in Daytona Beach, Florida, the Daytona Educational and Industrial Training School for Negro Girls, a pre-collegiate school. While vacationing nearby, White learned about the financially struggling institution, and became, in Bethune's words, her "first friend". White provided financial assistance and also arranged for his employees to make a series of structural and infrastructure improvements. He later became a trustee, and upon his death bequeathed a $79,000 endowment. In 1915 Mrs. Bethune dedicated a large administrative building as White Hall in his honor. This school evolved into Bethune–Cookman College.

The Thomas H. White Foundation was founded as the Thomas H. White Charitable Trust in 1913. Following his death in 1914, White was buried at Lake View Cemetery.
