= Frigidaire Memphis plant =

- Built: 2012–2014
- Operated: 2014–2022
- Location: 3231 Paul R. Lowry Road; Memphis, Tennessee, United States
- Coordinates: 35°3′36″N 90°9′23″W
- Industry: Home appliances
- Products: drop-in/slide-in ranges; wall ovens; specialty free-standing ranges; cooktops
- Employees: 500 (2022)
- Volume: 750,000 square feet (70,000 m^{2})
- Owner: Electrolux

Frigidaire Memphis plant was a Frigidaire appliance manufacturing plant in Memphis, Tennessee, owned by Electrolux. Workers will manufacture the company's Electrolux ICON, Electrolux and Frigidaire product lines, including drop-in/slide-in ranges, wall ovens, specialty free-standing ranges and cooktops.

== History ==
A new cooktop manufacturing facility was built in the Frank C. Pidgeon Industrial park, southwest of Memphis. The facility is built to LEED certification standards.

The $190 million, 750,000-square-foot Memphis manufacturing plant began production of stoves and ranges in January 2014 under Frigidaire, Electrolux, and Electrolux ICON brands. Supported by roughly $150 million in state and local tax incentives, the facility was built to produce 600,000 ovens annually.

The plant's research and development center includes the technology and machinery to simulate a stove's lifetime usage and performance expectations and can test more than 300 products at one time.

In January 2019, it was announced that Electrolux will close its facility in Memphis, shifting production to a union facility in Springfield, Tennessee. The 785,000-square-foot Memphis plant was eventually shuttered entirely on June 30, 2022, and was purchased by Phoenix Investors in December 2023.
