= Windsor T. White =

American automobile manufacturer (1866–1958)

- Born: Windsor Thomas White; August 28, 1866; Orange, Massachusetts, U.S.
- Died: April 9, 1958 (aged 91); Hobe Sound, Florida, U.S.
- Resting place: Lake View Cemetery
- Education: Worcester Polytechnic Institute (BS)
- Known for: co-founder and president of White Motor Company
- Spouse: Delia Bulkley Holden (m. 1893; died 1947)
- Children: 3, including Windsor
- Father: Thomas H. White

Windsor Thomas White (August 28, 1866 – April 9, 1958) was an American automobile manufacturer from Cleveland. Along with his brothers Rollin and Walter, he founded the White Motor Company, an early manufacturer of steam-powered vehicles.

== Early life ==
Windsor Thomas White was born on August 28, 1866, in Orange, Massachusetts, as one of eight children to Thomas H. White, founder of the White Sewing Machine Company. The family moved to Cleveland, Ohio, in 1866. He received training at his father's company and graduated with a Bachelor of Science from Worcester Polytechnic Institute in 1890.

== Career ==
Following graduation, White moved to Florida and was active in surveying the country around Hastings, Florida, until September 1891. He then returned to Cleveland and worked at White Sewing Machine Company. In 1893, he became treasurer of the Cleveland Machine Screw Company (later the Cleveland Automatic Machine Company). From 1895 to 1903, he was vice president of the White Sewing Machine Company.

In 1900, White and his brothers Rollin and Walter developed White Steamer cars and trucks within the White Sewing Machine Company. White served as the company's administrator and became its president when it became White Company in 1903. From 1901 to 1910, their company became the second-largest steam-powered vehicle manufacturer. By 1906, their annual production was 1,500 cars. Their vehicles were used militarily by the United States Department of War and the French government during World War I. In 1911, the company began making gasoline-powered vehicles. In 1915, the White Motor Company was formed and White became its president and the company manufactured passenger cars, motor trucks, and buses. By 1919, the company stopped its passenger car line and focused their production to trucks and commercial vehicles. They produced over 12,000 units annually. In May 1921, White was succeeded as president by his brother Walter and White became chairman of the board of both the White Company and the White Motor Company. He served as chairman until his resignation in 1927. The White Company was converted into the sales branch of the White Motor Company and dissolved in the late 1930s.

White was the first chairman of the motor truck committee of the National Automobile Chamber of Commerce. He was also a director of the Chamber of Commerce and served on its patents committee. He later served as chairman of the board of the Park Drop Forge Company of Cleveland. He was a director of the First National Bank.

== Game hunting ==
One of White's hobbies was big game hunting. He had three safaris to Africa. His first safari was in 1928. In 1930, he led the White-Fuller American Expedition to British East Africa for the Cleveland Museum of Natural History, where he spent six months with Arthur B. Fuller, the chief preparator for the museum. The expedition returned with 700 specimens, including species of bird and 3,000 feet (910 m) of film, which included close up shots of lions, zebra, hippopotamuses, and giraffes. In 1937, in his third expedition, he brought back more specimens, including animal heads that were used to decorate his home.

== Personal life ==
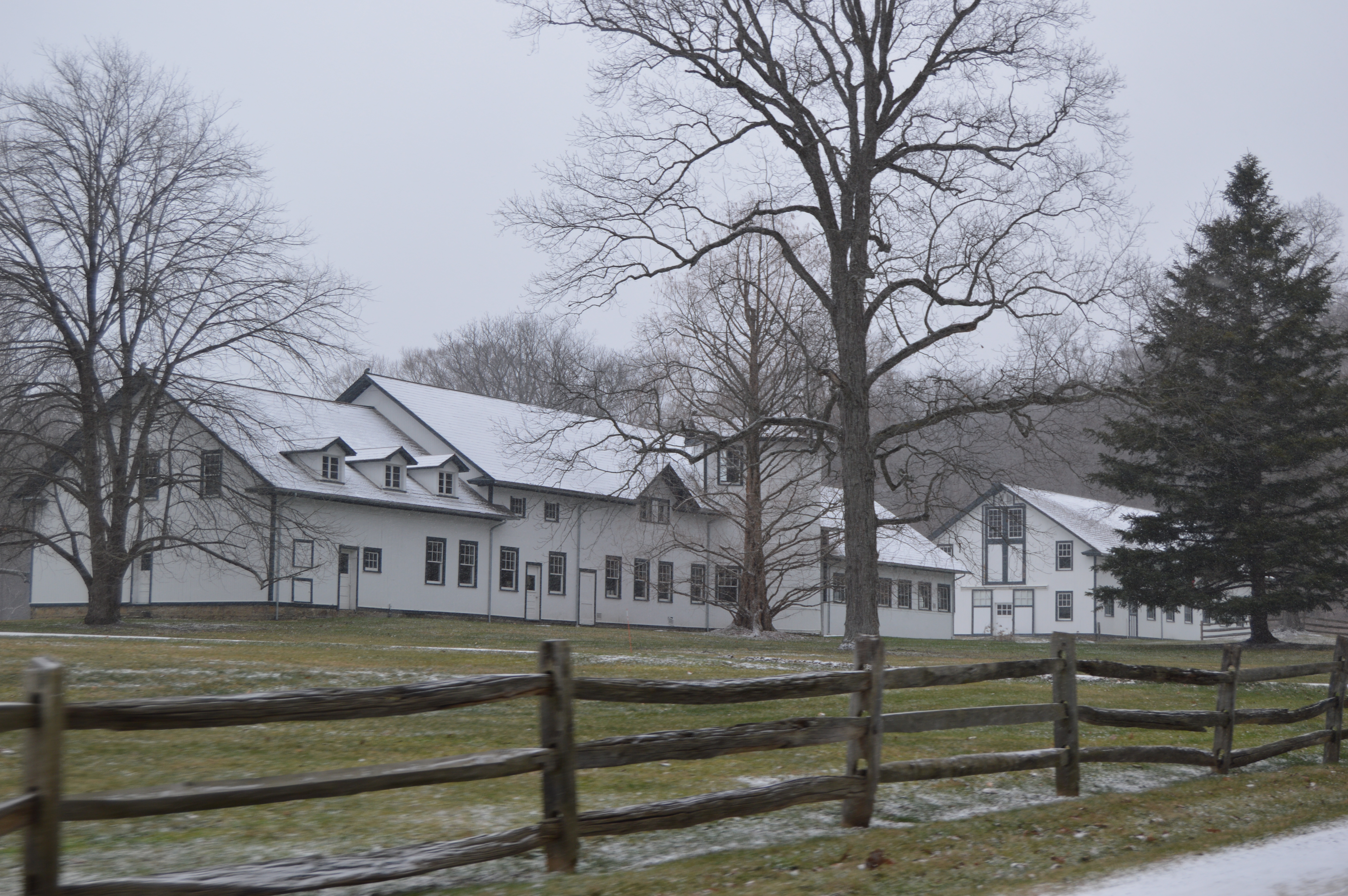
Buildings at Halfred Farms, White's estate in Hunting Valley

White married Delia Bulkley Holden, daughter of Liberty E. Holden, on September 14, 1893. They had three children, Delia Bulkley, Windsor Holden, and Thomas H. His wife died in 1947. His son Windsor was a polo player.

White lived at Halfred Farms, a 1,080 acres (440 ha) estate in Hunting Valley, Ohio. He was a horseman and polo player and had a polo field at Halfred Farms. He also engaged in fox hunting in the Chagrin Valley and was a master of foxhounds at the Chagrin Valley Hunt Club. He was also a member of the Winous Point Shooting Club and the Union League Club of New York. He was a Republican and a member of the Unitarian Church.

In February 1958, White had a stroke. He died while visiting his brother Rollin at his home in Hobe Sound, Florida, on April 9, 1958. He was buried in Lake View Cemetery.

== Legacy ==
In 1997, White and his brothers were inducted into the Automotive Hall of Fame.
