= Frigidaire Anderson plant =

- Built: 1988
- Operated: 1988–present
- Location: 101 Masters Boulevard; Anderson, South Carolina, United States
- Coordinates: 34°26′44″N 82°40′41″W
- Industry: Home appliances
- Products: top-freezer refrigerators; upright freezers
- Employees: 1,200
- Area: 225 acres (91 ha)
- Volume: 1,600,000 square feet (150,000 m^{2})
- Owner: Electrolux

Frigidaire Anderson plant is a Frigidaire appliance manufacturing plant in Anderson, South Carolina, owned by Electrolux.

== History ==
The factory was built and opened on October 17, 1988 by White Consolidated Industries (which was a subsidiary of Electrolux) to manufacture refrigerators and freezers.

In 2017, Electrolux announced a $200 million investment to expand its refrigeration plant in Anderson, South Carolina, adding 800,000 square feet of new manufacturing and warehouse space. Construction began in the summer of 2017 and concluded toward 2019.

In 2019, Electrolux completed a major $250 million expansion of its manufacturing plant, adding 800,000 square feet and consolidating freezer production from the now-closed St. Cloud, Minnesota, manufacturing plant. In 2022, the factory was producing over 2 million refrigerators and freezers annually.

In April 2026, Electrolux announced it will be temporarily closing its Anderson, South Carolina, refrigerator plant, laying off 1,200 employees in July of that year. The Frigidaire plant is being retooled to turn into a laundry manufacturing plant in 2027 as part of a joint venture with China's Midea Group, which owns 45% of the new venture while Electrolux holds 55%.
