= Alfred Mellowes =

American electrical engineer (1879–1960)

- Born: Alfred Wytheman Mellowes; April 7, 1879; Dayton, Ohio, U.S.
- Died: February 1, 1960 (aged 80); Michigan, U.S.
- Occupation: Electrical engineer
- Spouse: Laura Feller McCoy

Alfred Wytheman Mellowes (1879-1960) was an electrical engineer who made the first self-contained electric refrigerator in 1915 in Fort Wayne.

== Career ==
In 1916, he founded the Guardian Frigerator Company in partnership with J. W. Murray whose business would manufacture the "frigerators" in Detroit. The business was unsuccessful initially as the rate of production was low. William C. Durant inspected the production line and advised Murray to buy out the business. In 1918, Durant then bought the business from Murray and renamed the company Frigidaire. Durant then sold the business to his other company, General Motors, in 1919. The company was subsequently moved to Dayton, Ohio where Mellowes was born.
