= Gibson Appliance =

Refrigeration products company since 1877

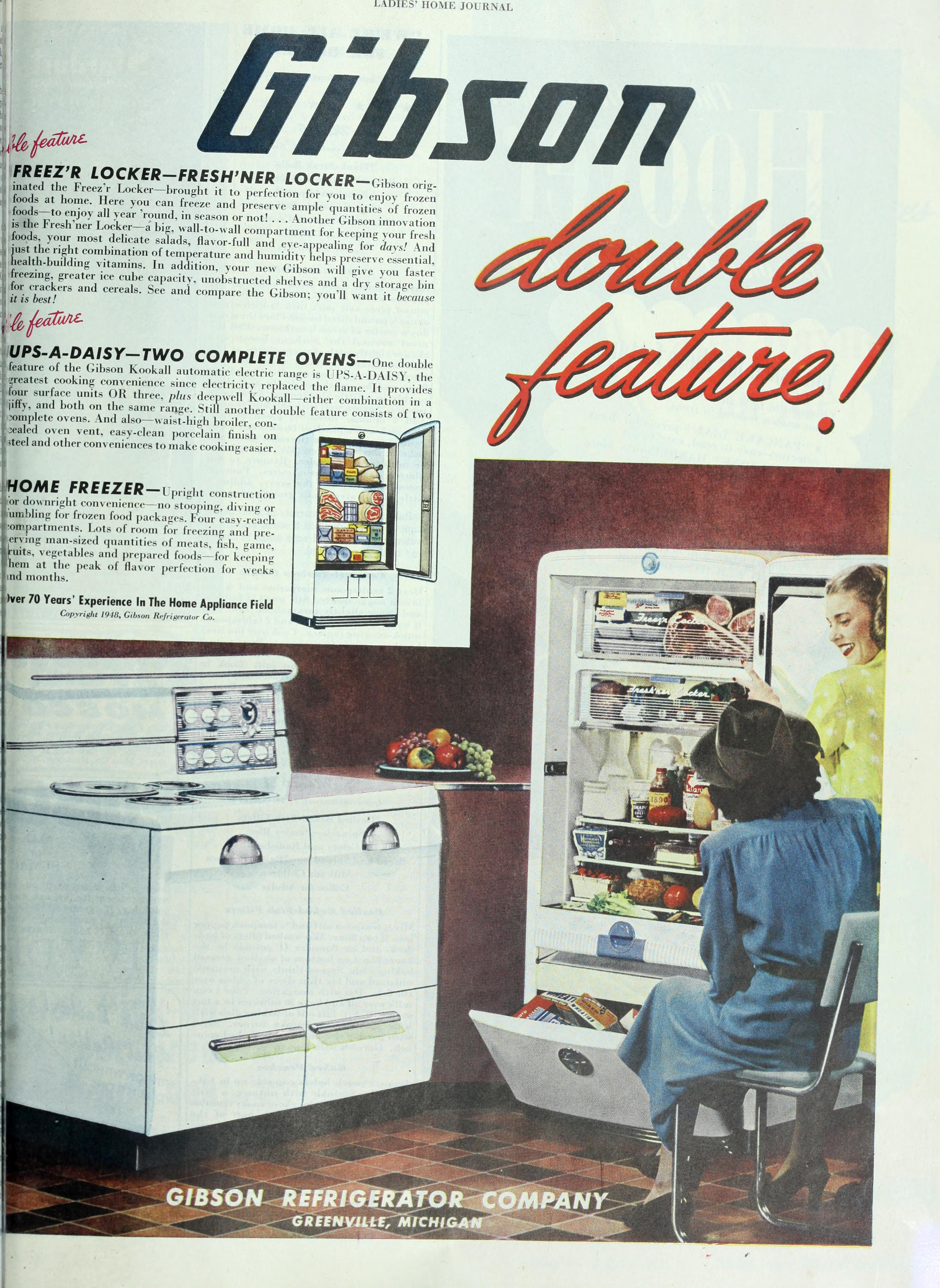
Gibson appliance advertisement, 1948.

Gibson was founded by Joshua Hall in Belding, Michigan, in 1877 as the Belding-Hall Company selling cabinets that housed blocks of ice (ice-boxes). The area around Belding, Michigan, had a skilled workforce of Danish craftsmen and a good supply of hardwoods including ash. The company was purchased by Frank Gibson, a competing manufacturer of "ice refrigerators" in the early 1900s. It was the largest in its industry at the time. In 1931, the company began making electric refrigerators.

During the Second World War, Gibson manufactured 1,078 Waco CG-4 troop and cargo assault gliders under license.

The company claims to have innovated the refrigerator light, the upright freezer, and the "Air Sweep" mechanism for distributing conditioned air.

In 1956, Hupp Corporation acquired Gibson. In 1967 Hupp merged with White Consolidated Industries (WCI), which created the White-Westinghouse brand in 1975. WCI was purchased by Electrolux in 1986, which retained the Gibson brand.
