= Frigidaire =

American subsidiary of Electrolux

Frigidaire Appliance Company
- Type: Subsidiary
- Industry: Major appliances, small appliances
- Founded: 1918; 108 years ago (as Guardian Frigerator Company); Fort Wayne, Indiana, U.S.
- Headquarters: Charlotte, North Carolina, U.S.
- Key people: Keith McLoughlin (CEO)
- Products: Clothes washers and dryers, refrigerators, freezers, dishwashers, ranges, room air conditioners, dehumidifiers, microwave ovens
- Parent: Electrolux
- Website: www.frigidaire.com

Frigidaire Appliance Company is the American consumer and commercial home appliances brand subsidiary of multinational company Electrolux, a Swedish multinational home appliance manufacturer, headquartered in Stockholm.

== History ==
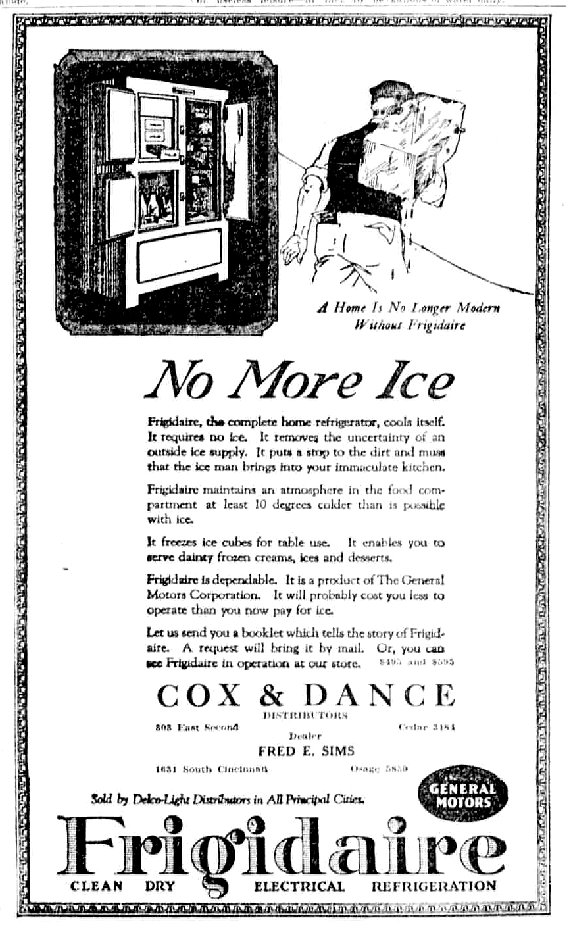
1922 Frigidaire "iceless" refrigerator newspaper ad.

Frigidaire was founded as the Guardian Frigerator Company in Fort Wayne, Indiana, and developed the first self-contained refrigerator, invented by Nathaniel B. Wales and Alfred Mellowes in 1916. In 1918, William C. Durant, a founder of General Motors, personally invested in the company and in 1919, it adopted the name Frigidaire.

The brand was so well known in the refrigeration field in the early-to-mid-1900s, that many Americans called any refrigerator a Frigidaire regardless of brand. The popularity of Frigidaire may have influenced the English word fridge, an unusual contraction of refrigerator.

From 1919 to 1979, the company was owned by General Motors. During that period, it was first a subsidiary of Delco-Light and was later an independent division based in Dayton, Ohio. The division also manufactured air conditioning compressors for GM cars. While the company was owned by General Motors, its logo featured the phrase "Product of General Motors", and later renamed to "Home Environment Division of General Motors".

On January 31, 1979, General Motors sold the Frigidaire appliance division to White Consolidated Industries for approximately $120 million after the unit suffered a $40 million loss in 1978. In 1986, WCI was purchased by Electrolux for $742 million, its current parent.

The company claims firsts including:

- Electric self-contained refrigerator (September, 1918 in Detroit)
- Home food freezer
- Room air conditioner
- 30" electric range
- Coordinated colors for home appliances

== Automatic washers ==
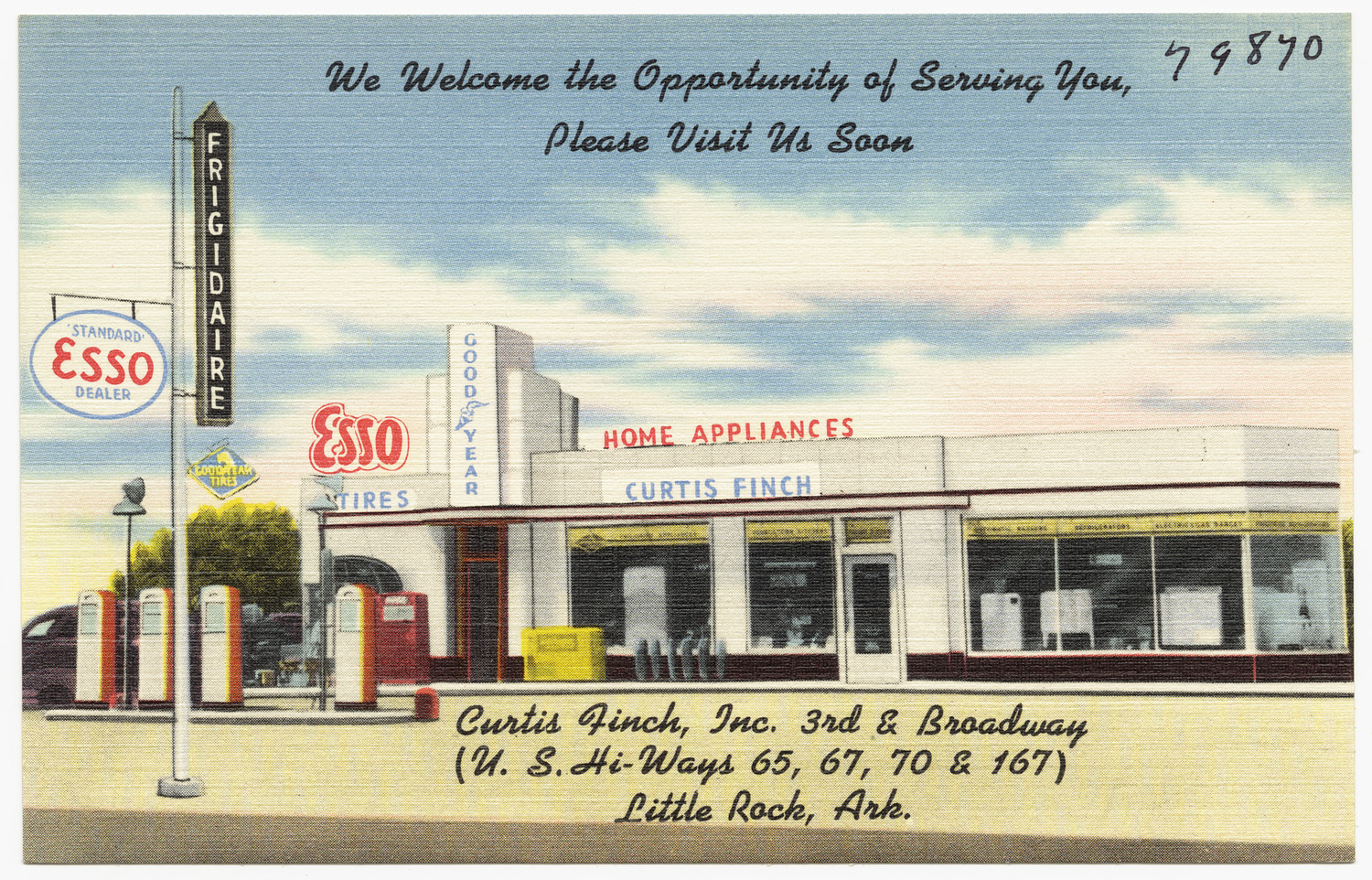
Frigidaire dealer and Esso gas station, Arkansas, ca. 1930–1945

During the years that Frigidaire was owned by General Motors, it was very competitive in the automatic clothes-washing-machine business. Frigidaire engineer Kenneth Sisson, also credited with the design of the incrementing timer used on clothes washers and dishwashers for years to come, designed the Frigidaire automatic washer with the Unimatic mechanism in the late 1930s. Production of the first Frigidaire automatic clothes washers was halted due to World War II and therefore the machine was not formally introduced until 1947. The washing action of a Frigidaire automatic was unique in that the agitator pulsated up and down, a unique departure from the traditional oscillating type. The Frigidaire washers were commonly named for their mechanisms, which underwent frequent changes over the years. The Unimatic was in production the longest, for any single Frigidaire mechanism, from 1947 to 1958 for home automatic washers and through 1963 for coin-operated commercial washers for self-service laundromats. The Pulsamatic mechanism, unique in that it pulsated 630 times per minute, was introduced in 1955 for the lower-end models. This became the foundation for the Multimatic, introduced for the 1959 model year. The Multimatic lasted through 1964, as the Rollermatic was brought out for the 1965 lineup. The Rollermatic was unique in that instead of using an oil-filled gearcase, metal and urethane rollers transferred the power within the mechanism. This underwent a slight revision in 1970 for the new eighteen-pound capacity 1–18, which kept the same basic mechanism but differed in that it was belt-driven off of the motor and added a recirculating pump. Besides the unique action, another notable feature of these older washers was the final, high-speed spin cycle (nicknamed "Rapidry"), 1140 revolutions per minute in the Unimatic, 850 in the Multimatic, and 1010 in the high-end Rollermatic models.

When Frigidaire was acquired by White Consolidated Industries in 1979, it abandoned the General Motors design in favor of the Westinghouse-produced top-loading design, as White-Westinghouse was already among its house brands by this time.

== Refrigerators ==
A modern Frigidaire domestic refrigerator

Frigidaire also produces a wide variety of refrigerators and freezers for the consumer market. Their model line-up includes refrigerator freezer units of several different types. The selection they offer includes traditional Top Freezer models, as well as more modern Side-By-Side and French Door styles.

In 2016, Frigidaire partnered with Ryder and Embark, an autonomous trucking firm, to deliver refrigerators from Texas to California. Level 2 autonomous trucks are used. They had a driver behind the wheel at all times. The reason for experimenting with autonomous vehicles was a shortage of drivers. In 2015, the American Trucking Association predicted that there would be a shortage of 175,000 drivers by 2024.

== Air conditioners ==
In addition to manufacturing room air conditioners, Frigidaire also provided the factory air conditioning systems for General Motors (GM) automobiles. From the 1950s through the 1970s, these units developed a reputation for providing powerful air conditioning systems on virtually all GM cars and trucks from the largest Cadillacs to the small Chevrolet Vega. GM also sold Frigidaire auto air conditioning compressors to British Leyland for Jaguar and to Rolls-Royce for Rolls-Royce and Bentley branded cars.

== Manufacturing ==
As of 2026, Electrolux has 3 home appliance manufacturing plants in the United States.

Frigidaire manufacturing facilities in the United States
Name	Location	Products	Operated	Notes / Refs.
Springfield plant	Springfield, Tennessee	gas ranges; electric ranges; wall ovens	1974–present	
Anderson plant	Anderson, South Carolina	top-freezer refrigerators; upright freezers	1988–present	The Anderson plant is being retooled to produce top-load washers and dryers under Frigidaire and Midea brands in 2027 as part of a joint venture with China's Midea Group, which owns 45% of the new venture while Electrolux holds 55%.
Kinston plant	Kinston, North Carolina	dishwashers	1989–present	

It also has operated a large manufacturing facility in Juarez, Mexico since 2005.

In the 1970s, Frigidaire manufacturing operations in the United States were located in the Dayton, Ohio area, including its historic Plant No. 1 and headquarters at 300 Taylor Street in downtown Dayton, and the massive sprawling complex in suburban Moraine, south of Dayton.

Former Frigidaire manufacturing facilities in the United States
Name	Location	Products	Operated	Notes / Refs.
Greenville plant	Greenville, Michigan	top-freezer refrigerators; side-by-side refrigerators	1892–2006	Closed in 2006.
Webster City plant	Webster City, Iowa	top-load washing machines; front-load washing machines; clothes dryers	1937–2011	Closed in 2011.
Edison plant	Edison, New Jersey	air conditioners	1951–2003	Closed in July 2003.
St. Cloud plant	St. Cloud, Minnesota	chest freezers; upright freezers	1946–2019	Closed in 2019
Memphis plant	Memphis, Tennessee	drop-in/slide-in ranges; wall ovens; specialty free-standing ranges; cooktops	2014–2022	Opened in January 2014 to produce Frigidaire cooking products. Closed on June 30, 2022.
Dayton plant	Dayton, Ohio	washing machines; clothes dryers; dishwashers	c.1948–1979	Also known as Plant No. 1, it was located at 300 Taylor Street in downtown Dayton, and was the Frigidaire headquarters under General Motors.
Moraine plant	Moraine, Ohio	refrigerators; automotive air conditioning compressors	1951–1979	The plant was also known as Plant No. 4.

As of 2022, air conditioning units are manufactured in China.

The Consumer Product Safety Commission, alerted by users on social media platforms like Twitter/X, Instagram, Facebook, and others, discovered quality issues with Frigidaire products and issued two recalls in 2024 alone.

== Recalls and reliability issues ==
Frigidaire has had several recent recalls:

=== 2023 ===
- Frigidaire (Electrolux) Recalls Gas Cooktops Due to Risk of Gas Leak, Fire Hazard.
- Frigidaire (Electrolux) Recalls Laundry units Due to Risk of Fire Hazard.

=== 2024 ===
- Frigidaire (Electrolux) recalls rear-controlled ranges due to electrical shock and electrocution hazards.
- Frigidaire (Electrolux) recalls side by side refrigerators with slim ice buckets due to choking and laceration hazards.

=== 2025 ===
- Frigidaire (Electrolux) recalls 1.7 million air conditioners as part of Midea recall.
- Frigidaire (Curtis International) recalled 634,000 mini fridges due to the potential for internal short circuits and fire hazard.

=== BBB rating ===
- Frigidaire is rated 1.03 out of 5.00 in customer reviews on BBB (Better Business Bureau).

== See also ==
- Frigidaire Building, a historic structure in Portland, Oregon
