= White-Westinghouse =

American home appliance brand

- Product type: Home appliance
- Country: United States
- Introduced: 1975
- Markets: Worldwide
- Previous owners: White Consolidated Industries
- Website: https://www.whitewestinghouse.com/index.html

White-Westinghouse is an American home appliance brand that dates to 1975, when White Consolidated Industries acquired the major-appliance division of Westinghouse Electric Corporation. White Consolidated Industries was acquired by Swedish appliance manufacturer Electrolux in 1986.

Electrolux continued to market White-Westinghouse appliances internationally during the 2000s. In 2006, Electrolux International presented new White-Westinghouse appliances alongside products from several other Electrolux-owned or distributed brands at a meeting attended by distributors from 52 countries.

White-Westinghouse entered the Indian market in 2020 through a partnership with Super Plastronics Private Limited (SPPL), which became a licensee for the brand in India.

== History ==
Westinghouse entered the electric cooking-appliance business through the Copeman Electric Stove Company. Inventor Lloyd Groff Copeman founded the company in Flint, Michigan, and sold it to Westinghouse Electric Corporation in 1917. Production was subsequently moved to Mansfield, Ohio.

On March 1, 1975, White Consolidated Industries acquired the physical assets of Westinghouse Electric Corporation's appliance division. Archival material held by the Senator John Heinz History Center identifies the acquisition as the beginning of the White-Westinghouse appliance business under White Consolidated Industries.

In 1986, Electrolux acquired White Consolidated Industries. Contemporary reporting described White Consolidated as the third-largest appliance manufacturer in the United States and identified White-Westinghouse among its appliance brands. Electrolux's corporate history also lists White-Westinghouse among the brands included with its acquisition of White Consolidated.

During the 1990s, the White-Westinghouse trademark was licensed for categories of small household appliances. In 1996, White Consolidated Industries entered into a licensing agreement with Salton/Maxim Housewares that permitted the use of the White-Westinghouse trademark on specified products.

In January 1997, Salton obtained a multi-year contract to sell kitchen and small household appliances carrying the White-Westinghouse name through Kmart in the United States.

A later corporate filing states that Kmart exercised an option in June 2000 to terminate a long-term supply contract involving White-Westinghouse consumer-electronics products in the United States. The termination became effective on June 30, 2002, and Applica terminated its White-Westinghouse license agreement at the end of that year.
