= White Sewing Machine Company =

American manufacturer of sewing machines

Coordinates: 41.532842°N 81.635034°W

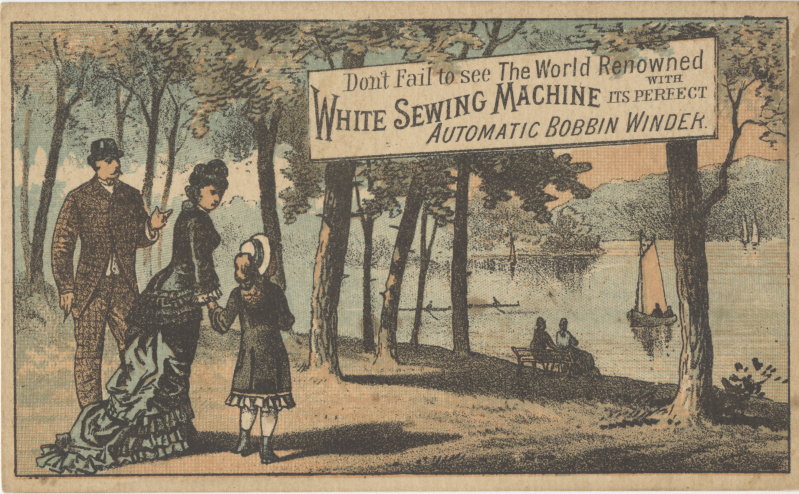
- Type: Subsidiary
- Founded: 1858; 168 years ago in Templeton, Massachusetts, United States
- Founder: Thomas H. White
- Fate: Acquired by Electrolux in 1986
- Headquarters: Cleveland, Ohio, United States
- Area served: Worldwide
- Products: Sewing machines
- Parent: Electrolux

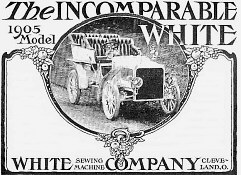
White Sewing Machine Company manufactured automobiles, trucks, buses and agricultural machinery

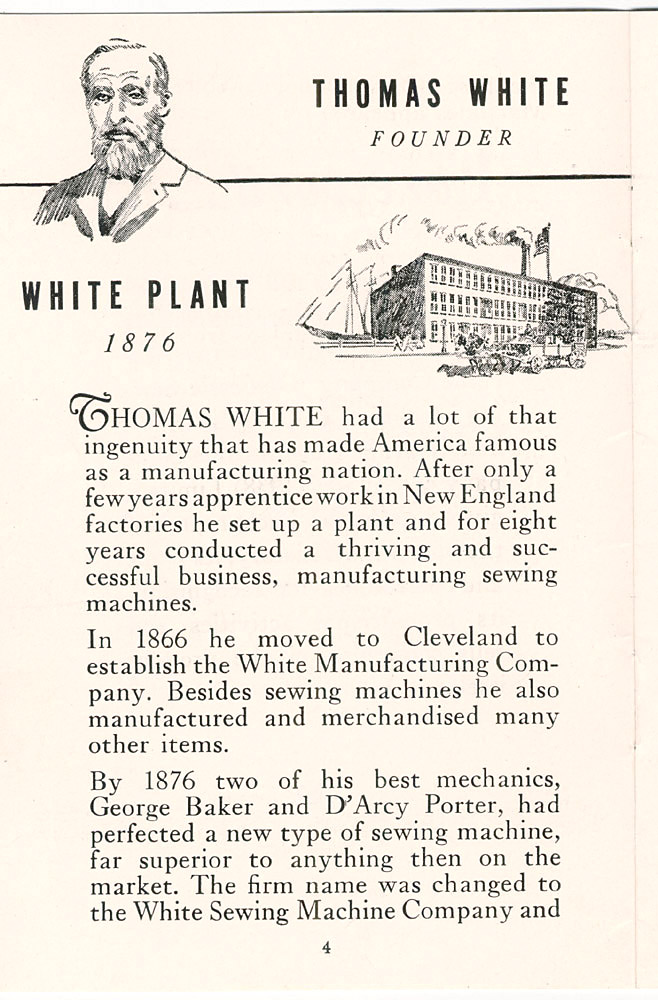
White Sewing Machine Company 1941 company book

The White Sewing Machine Company was a sewing machine company founded by Thomas H. White in 1866 and based in Cleveland, Ohio. It produced the White Sewing Machine and White Rotary machine, along with supplying private label sewing machines to Sears Roebuck and Co between the 1920s and 1950s. Later, it diversified its product lines and became White Consolidated Industries (WCI) in 1964. WCI was acquired by Electrolux in 1986.

== History ==
Founded as the White Manufacturing Company in 1866, it took the White Sewing Machine Company name in 1876. White Sewing Machines won numerous awards at international expositions, including the 1889 Universelle Exposition in Paris. White began supplying sewing machines to Sears Roebuck and Co in 1924. By the 1930s, all Sears sewing machines were Whites rebadged as Kenmore, Franklin, Minnesota, and other house brands. A White Rotary Electric Series 77 machine was placed in the Crypt of Civilization. (Note: A photo of the machine inside Crypt of Civilization can be seen here.)

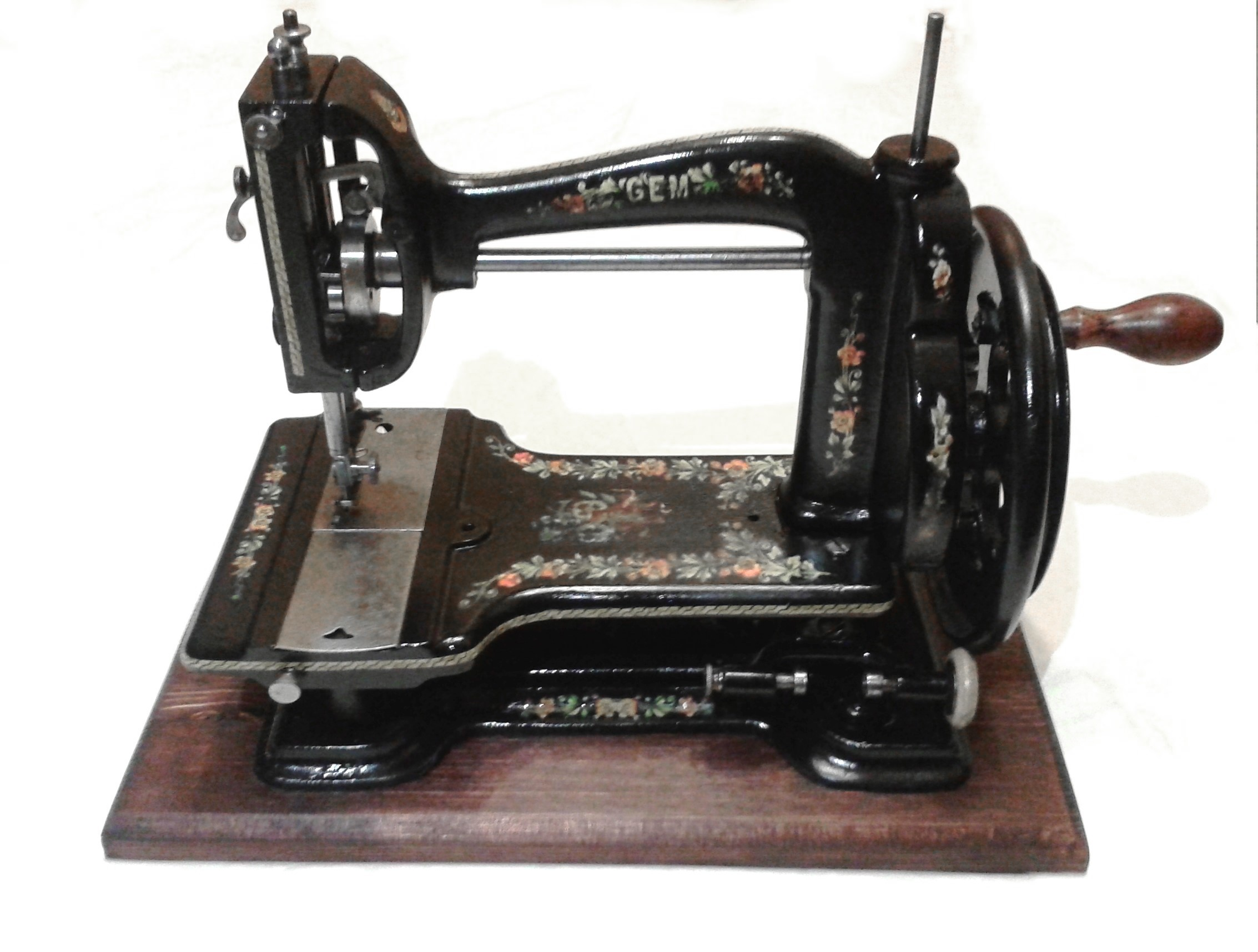
A rare White Gem (USA) from about 1887

=== White Motor Company ===
In 1900, Thomas White's son, Rollin, developed a steam engine, using a corner of one of his father's factories to start building automobiles. In 1906, the automotive venture was spun off as its own company, the White Motor Company. By 1923, the White Sewing Machine Company had divested all side ventures to focus solely on sewing machines and accessories.

=== Later history ===
By the early 1950s, however, White was losing money amid a flood of cheaper imported sewing machines and the loss of a supplier contract from Sears, which had represented 40 percent of White's business. Edward Reddig became company president in 1955, and he led an aggressive campaign of shifting manufacturing overseas, slashing domestic manufacturing, and diversification. White moved heavily into appliances, tools and machinery, acquiring appliance brands such as Kelvinator (from American Motors), Gibson, Philco (from Ford Motor Company/GTE) and Franklin (a private label supplier, from Studebaker-Worthington). To reflect this, the company renamed itself White Consolidated Industries (WCI) in 1964.

In 1967, WCI bought Franklin Manufacturing from the Studebaker Corporation for approximately $21 million. At the time of the sale, Franklin was a prominent private-name home-appliance manufacturer with 1966 annual sales of $70 million.

WCI purchased Westinghouse's major appliance business in 1975, which resulted in creation of the White-Westinghouse brand name. In 1979, WCI bought the Frigidaire appliance line from General Motors.

In March 1986, WCI was acquired by Electrolux for $742 million.

In 2006 Electrolux spun off a number of its lines under the Husqvarna (including variations of the Husqvarna) brand name. The White line of sewing machines was consolidated into the lower end Husqvarna Viking brand after this spinoff. The White-Westinghouse brand name remained with Electrolux and that name is the only remnant of the "White Sewing Machine Company" name, however the brand line included no sewing machines.

New White-branded sewing machines models have not been manufactured since the Husqvarna spinoff in 2006. Singer, Husqvarna Viking and Pfaff brands are now all owned by SVP Worldwide. Though not advertised, SVP provides all of their user manuals for all of their brands including the "White" brand through the Singer brand website.

== Notable sewing machines ==
=== White Sewing Machine ===
The White Sewing Machine, also known as the White Vibrating Shuttle or the White VS, was the White Sewing Machine Company's first model. It used a vibrating shuttle bobbin driver design. The White VS was produced, with improvements, until the early 1900s.

=== White Family Rotary ===
White Family Rotary
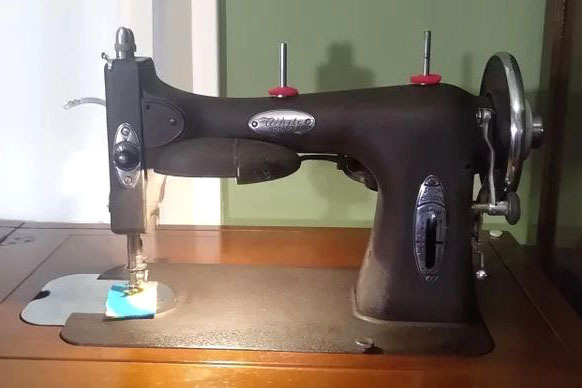
- A White Rotary model #43 from 1939
- Powered: Treadle, hand crank, add-on electric
- Material: Fabric
- Stitch: Lockstitch
- Feed: Drop
- Needle(s): One 15x1

The White Family Rotary or White FR, later called White Rotary or White Rotary Electric, was a rotary hook sewing machine produced between the late 1890s and the 1930s. It joined the successful White Vibrating Shuttle on White's expanding product line and eventually eclipsed it. It was originally sold as a treadle with cabinet or as a hand-crank with carrying case. Later, add-on electric motors with foot or knee control were available pre-installed or as a field upgrade.

Typical cost for this machine as a treadle with a cabinet was US$65 in 1909, which is about US$1532 adjusted. The company made cabinets in various styles, including a "Martha Washington" style in the 1930s.

The White Rotary was sold under multiple brands, including Domestic, Franklin, and Kenmore. A White Rotary Electric Series 77 machine was placed in the Crypt of Civilization.

White reused the White Rotary name in the 1950s and 1960s, applying it to a machine manufactured by Juki (White model #659). This machine had a rotary-driven thread takeup instead of the more common takeup lever. The Rotary name was later used again on a stretch stitch-capable sewing machine.

== See also ==
- List of sewing machine brands
- Whitin Machine Works
