= Glossary of sewing terms =

This glossary contains terms used in sewing, tailoring and related crafts. For terms used in the creation or manufacturing of textiles, including spinning, knitting, weaving, and individual fabrics and finishing processes, see Glossary of textile manufacturing. For terms used in dyeing, see Glossary of dyeing terms.

Sewing is the craft of fastening or attaching objects using stitches made with needle and thread. Sewing is one of the oldest of the textile arts, arising in the Paleolithic Era. Although usually associated with clothing and household linens, sewing is used in a variety of crafts and industries, including shoemaking, upholstery, sailmaking, bookbinding and the manufacturing of some kinds of sporting goods. Sewing is the fundamental process underlying a variety of textile arts and crafts, including embroidery, tapestry, quilting, appliqué and patchwork.

== A ==
appliqué
Appliqué is a technique of sewing or otherwise attaching small pieces of fabric to a larger piece in order to decorate it or form a pattern.
armscye
The armscye is the opening in the bodice to which the sleeve is attached.

== B ==
baste
To baste is to join fabric together with long removable stitches.
bias

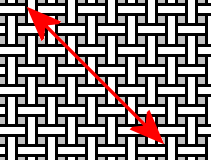
Bias

The bias direction of a piece of woven fabric, usually referred to simply as "the bias", is at 45 degrees to its warp and weft threads. Every piece of woven fabric has two biases, perpendicular to each other. Non-woven fabrics such as felt or interfacing do not have a bias.
bias tape
Bias tape or bias binding is a narrow strip of fabric, cut on the bias. The strip's fibers, being at 45 degrees to the length of the strip, makes it stretchier as well as more fluid and more drapeable compared to a strip that is cut on grain. Many strips can be pieced together into a long "tape." The tape's width varies from about 1/2" to about 3" (10mm to 75mm) depending on applications. Bias tape is used in making piping, binding seams, finishing raw edges, etc. It is often used on the edges of quilts, placemats, and bibs, around armhole and neckline edges instead of a facing, and as a simple strap or tie for casual bags or clothing. While bias tape can be handmade, it is also available in pre-packaged lengths (although usually only in basic colors).
binding
Binding is used as both a noun and a verb to refer to finishing a seam, edge or hem of a garment, usually by rolling or pressing then stitching on an edging or trim.

== C ==
cord
Cord is twisted fibre, usually intermediate between rope and string.
casing
A casing is a fabric tunnel through which elastic or a drawstring can be threaded to pull in or draw up the fabric.

== D ==
dart
A dart is a common technique used for shaping garments. Darts are created by stitching out a wedge-shaped fold of fabric. They vary in width and length and can be tapered at one or both ends. They frequently appear around the bust and waist.
darning
1. Darning is a technique for repairing holes or worn areas in fabric or knitting using needle and thread. It is often done by hand, but it is also possible to darn with a sewing machine. Hand darning employs the darning stitch, a simple running stitch in which the thread is "woven" in rows along the grain of the fabric, with the stitcher reversing direction at the end of each row, and then filling in the framework thus created, as if weaving.
2. Darning also refers to any of several needlework techniques that are worked using darning stitches, including pattern darning (a type of embroidery), net darning or filet lace, and needle weaving, a drawn thread work technique.
darning mushroom
A darning mushroom is a tool used for darning clothes, particularly socks. The sock can be stretched over the "cap" of the mushroom, and gathered tightly around the stalk to provide taut surface for darning.
dressmaker
1. A dressmaker is a person who makes custom clothing for women, such as dresses, blouses, and evening gowns. Also called a mantua-maker (historically) or a modiste.
2. Dressmaker as an adjective denotes clothing made in the style of a dressmaker, frequently in the term dressmaker details which includes ruffles, frills, ribbon or braid trim. Dressmaker in this sense is contrasted to tailored and has fallen out of use since the rise of casual wear in the mid-twentieth century.
drop shoulder
A shoulder seam which extends past the actual shoulder point.

== E ==
embroidery
Embroidery is an ancient variety of decorative needlework in which designs and pictures are created by stitching strands of some material on to a layer of another material. See also:Machine embroidery.
eyelet
Eyelet may refer to a metal, plastic, or rubber ring that is inserted into a hole made through another material; in this case it is synonymous with grommet. They may be used to reinforce the hole, to shield something from the sharp edges of the hole, or both. An eyelet may also be the hole itself, held open with stitches.

== F ==
face
The "front" of a piece of fabric having a distinct front and back; same as right side.
facing
A facing is fabric used to finish the raw edges of a garment such as at neckline and armhole. Shaped facings are cut to match the edge they will face, and bias facings are strips of fabric cut on the bias or cross-grain and shaped to fit edge.
fusible interfacing
Commonly referred to as simply "Fusible" it is an interfacing fabric with glue on one or both sides that is ironed onto either a lining, facing or body fabric to provide structure.

== G ==
gather
Gathering is a technique for shortening the length of a strip of fabric so that the longer piece can be attached to a shorter piece. It is commonly used in clothing to manage fullness, as when a full sleeve is attached to the armscye or cuff of a shirt, or when a skirt is attached to a bodice. In simple gathering, parallel rows of running stitches are sewn along one edge of the fabric to be gathered. The stitching threads are then pulled or "drawn up" so that the fabric forms small folds along the threads. Multiple rows of gathering are called shirring.
godet

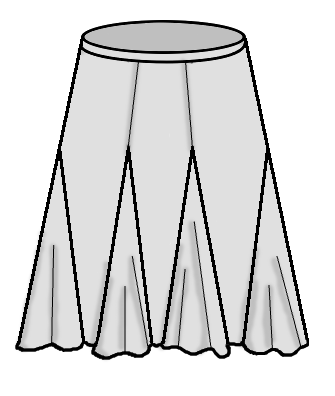
Six-gore skirt with godets.

A godet (/ɡoʊˈdeɪ/ or /ɡoʊˈdɛt/) is a piece of fabric wider at the bottom than at the top, often a circular sector, inserted into a garment to add fullness for ease of movement or as a design feature. Usually found in sleeves and skirts, but also in very full bell-bottom trousers. Compare gusset.
gore
A gore is a shaped segment, narrow at the top and wider at the base, extending from the waistline to the hem of a skirt. Flared skirts can be made of 2 or more gores. Four-. six-. and eight-gore skirts are common.
grain
1. The lengthwise and crosswise grain of fabric refer to the directions parallel to the warp and weft, respectively.
2. With the grain indicates parallel to the threads of a woven fabric, lengthwise or crosswise.
3. Dyed in the grain refers to dyeing with kermes, a red insect dye.
gusset
A gusset is a triangular or square piece of fabric inserted into a seam to add breadth or reduce stress from tight-fitting clothing. Gussets were used at the shoulders, underarms, and hems of traditional shirts and chemises made of rectangular lengths of linen to shape the garments to the body.

== H ==
haberdasher
A haberdasher is a person who sells small articles for sewing, such as buttons, ribbons, zippers, and other notions. In American English, haberdasher is another term for a men's outfitter. A haberdasher's shop or the items sold therein are called haberdashery.
header tape
Drapery header tape is a stiff fabric band sewn along the top edge of a curtain to provide stiffness and stability to the fabric so that it does not sag. To simplify the task of gathering pleats across the panel, the tape can be made with pleat pockets. It can also be used to conceal drapery hooks. It is sometimes used in conjunction with gathering tape, and can be sheer to help stiffen delicate fabric.
hem
1. To hem a piece of cloth (in sewing), a garment worker folds up a cut edge, folds it up again, and then sews it down. The process of hemming thus completely encloses the cut edge in cloth, so that it cannot ravel.
2. A hem is also the edge of cloth hemmed in this manner.

== I ==
interfacing
Interfacing is a common term for a variety of materials used on the unseen or "wrong" side of fabrics in sewing. Interfacings support the fashion fabric ("shell fabric") of the garment and may be selected to change the hang of the fabric in some portions of the garment; for instance, a shirt collar has an interior stiffening from interfacing.

== J ==
jersey
Jersey is a stretchy knitted fabric.

== L ==
lining
1. Lining is an inner layer of fabric, fur, or other material that provides a neat finish; conceals seam allowances, interfacing, and construction details; and allows a garment to slip on and off easily.
2. The process of inserting a lining layer.
list
A strip of cloth or other fabric

== M ==
mantua-maker
Mantua-maker is an 18th-century term for a dressmaker.
millinery
Millinery is women's hats and other articles sold by a milliner, or the profession or business of designing, making, or selling hats for women.
muslin
Muslin is the American English term for a test garment, frequently made from this fabric. The equivalent British English term is toile.

== N ==
needlework
Needlework is another term for the handicraft of decorative sewing and textile arts. Anything that uses a needle for construction can be called needlework.
notions
Notions are any small tools or accessories used in sewing.

== O ==
overlay
The top layer of fabric when a different fabric is underneath. Lace will often be an overlay and have a lining under to prevent being see through.

== P ==
pad stitching
Pad stitching is used to secure two pieces of fabric together with perpendicular stitches. Pad stitching is mainly used for lapels and collars to maintain their shape.
pattern
In sewing and fashion design, a pattern is an original garment from which other garments of a similar style are copied, or the paper or cardboard templates from which the parts of a garment are traced onto fabric before cutting out and assembling (sometimes called paper patterns). Home sewing patterns are generally printed on tissue paper and sold in packets containing sewing instructions and suggestions for fabric and trim.
piecing
Assembling a piece of fabric, or a garment, by stitching together smaller pieces of fabric into a single whole. Commonly used in quilting.
piping
Piping is a type of trim or embellishment consisting of a strip of folded fabric inserted into a seam to define the edges or style lines of a garment or other textile object. Usually the fabric strip is cut on the bias or cross-grain, and often it is folded over a cord. It may be made from either self-fabric (the same fabric as the object to be ornamented) or contrasting fabric, or of leather.
placket
1. A placket is an opening in the upper part of trousers or skirts, or at the neck or sleeve of a garment Plackets allow clothing to be put on or removed easily.
2. A stomacher. Also spelled placard.
3. A slit to allow access to a hanging pocket, or a petticoat or skirt pocket.
pleat
A pleat (older plait) is a type of fold formed by doubling fabric back upon itself and securing it in place. It is commonly used in clothing and upholstery to gather a wide piece of fabric to a narrower circumference. Pleats are categorized as pressed, that is, ironed or otherwise heat-set into a sharp crease, or unpressed, falling in soft rounded folds. Pleats may also be partially sewn flat and allowed to fall open below.
pocket
A pocket is a bag- or envelope-like receptacle either fastened to or inserted in an article of clothing to hold small items. In older usage, a pocket was a separate small bag or pouch.

== Q ==
quilt
1. Quilting is a method of sewing or tying two layers of cloth with a layer of insulating batting in between.
2. A bed covering or similar large rectangular piece of quilting work is called a quilt.

== R ==
right side
The "front" of a piece of fabric having a distinct front and back; same as face. Sometimes called the "public" side.
ruching
A gathered overlay. The fabric is gathered on two parallel sides and stitched to an underlay, creating a shelf effect. It is often done in sheers, like chiffon
running stitch
A running stitch is an embroidery stitch that passes in and out of the fabric in a straight line. This stitch can be used to baste fabric pieces together.

== S ==
seam
or
seamline

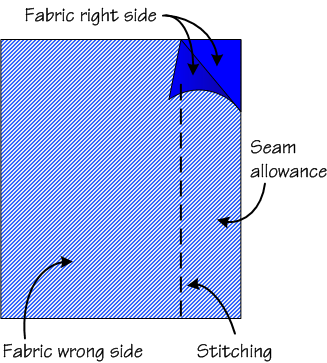
Plain seam

A seam or seamline in sewing is the line where two pieces of fabric are held together by thread.
seam allowance
A seam allowance is the area between the edge of fabric and the stitching line on two (or more) pieces of material being stitched together. Seam allowances can range from 1/4 inch wide (6.35 mm) to as much as several inches. Commercial patterns for home sewers have seam allowances ranging from 1/4 inch to 5/8 inch.
seam ripper
A seam ripper is a small tool used for unpicking or cutting stitches.
seamstress
A seamstress is a woman who sews and finishes garments, as contrasted with a dressmaker.
selvage
selvedge
The selvage (US English) or selvedge (British English) is the term for the self-finished edges of fabric. In woven fabric, selvages are the edges that run parallel to the warp, and are created by the weft thread looping back at the end of each row. The selvage of commercially produced fabrics is often cut away and discarded. Historically, garments were frequently constructed of full loom-widths of fabric joined selvage-to-selvage to avoid waste. In knitted fabrics, selvages are the unfinished yet structurally sound edges that were neither cast on nor bound off.
serging
Serging is the binding-off of an edge of cloth.
sewing
Sewing is an ancient craft involving the stitching of cloth, leather, animal skins, furs, or other materials, using needle and thread. Its use is nearly universal among human populations and dates back to Paleolithic times (30,000 BC). Sewing predates the weaving of cloth.
sewing circle
A sewing circle is a group of people, usually women, who meet and work on sewing projects together.
sloper
A sloper is a base pattern used to develop other patterns. Often called a Block or Master Pattern. This pattern is highly developed and very accurate pattern that is designed to fit a specific set of measurements. This pattern is used in turn to create other more stylized patterns.
staystitching
A stay stitch is a stitch that is used inside the seam allowance to stop the fabric from stretching.
stitch
A stitch is a single turn or loop of the thread or yarn in sewing, knitting, and embroidery. All stitches made with a sewing needle with an "eye" or hole are variations on seven basic stitches: running stitch, backstitch, overcast stitch, cross stitch, buttonhole or blanket stitch, chain stitch, and knot stitch. Sewing machine stitches are classified by their structure: chain stitch, made with one thread; lockstitch, made with two threads; and overlock, made with one to four threads.
surplice
A surplice is a neckline formed by overlapping the left and right bodice pieces to form a "V".

== T ==
tailor
A tailor is a person who makes, repairs, or alters clothing professionally, especially suits and men's clothing. Although the term dates to the thirteenth century, tailor took on its modern sense in the late eighteenth century, and now refers to makers of men's and women's suits, coats, trousers, and similar garments, usually of wool, linen, or silk.
tailored
tailor-made (from the second half of the twentieth century usually simplified to tailored) refers to clothing made by or in the style of clothes made by a tailor, characterized by simplicity of cut and trim and fine (often hand) finishing; as a women's clothing style tailored is opposed to dressmaker.
thread
Thread is a fine type of yarn.
thimble
A thimble is a protective shield worn on the finger or thumb.
third hand
A third hand is a clamp that holds the fabric to be sewn.
toile
Toile is the British English term for a test garment. The equivalent American English term is muslin.
trim
Trim or trimming in clothing and home decorating is applied ornamentation such as gimp, passementerie, ribbon, ruffles, or, as a verb, to apply such ornament.
twill tape
Twill tape is a flat twill-woven ribbon of cotton, linen, polyester, or wool.

== W ==
wrong side
The "back" of a piece of fabric having a distinct front and back.

== Y ==
yarn
Yarn is a long continuous length of interlocked fibers, suitable for use in the production of textiles, sewing, crocheting, knitting, weaving and ropemaking. Yarn can be made from any number of synthetic or natural fibers.

== See also ==
- List of sewing machine brands
- List of sewing tools and equipment
