= Embellishment =

Term in sewing

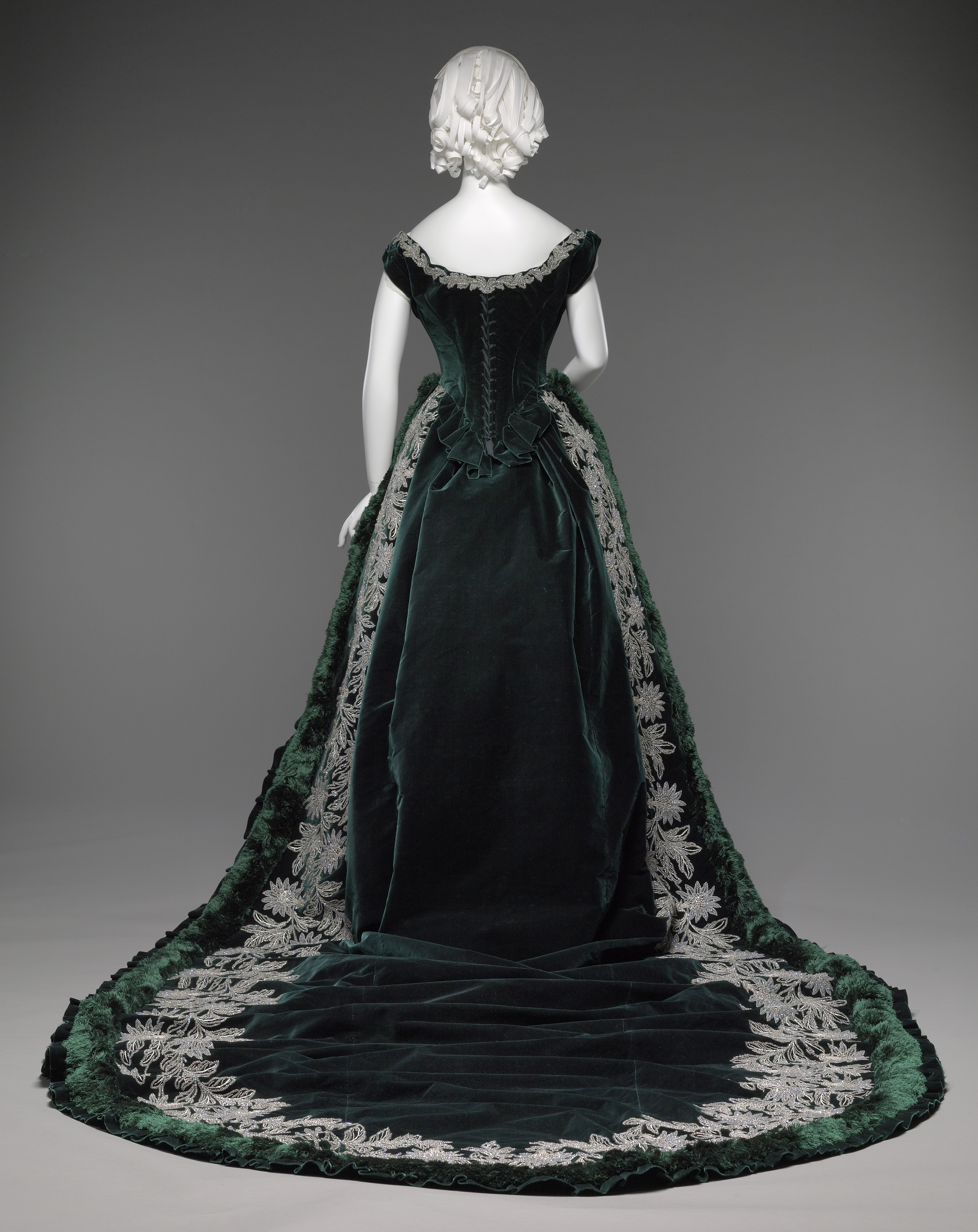
1880s Russian court dress, embellished with silk fringe, velvet ruffles, and embroidery with glass crystals and silver sequins.

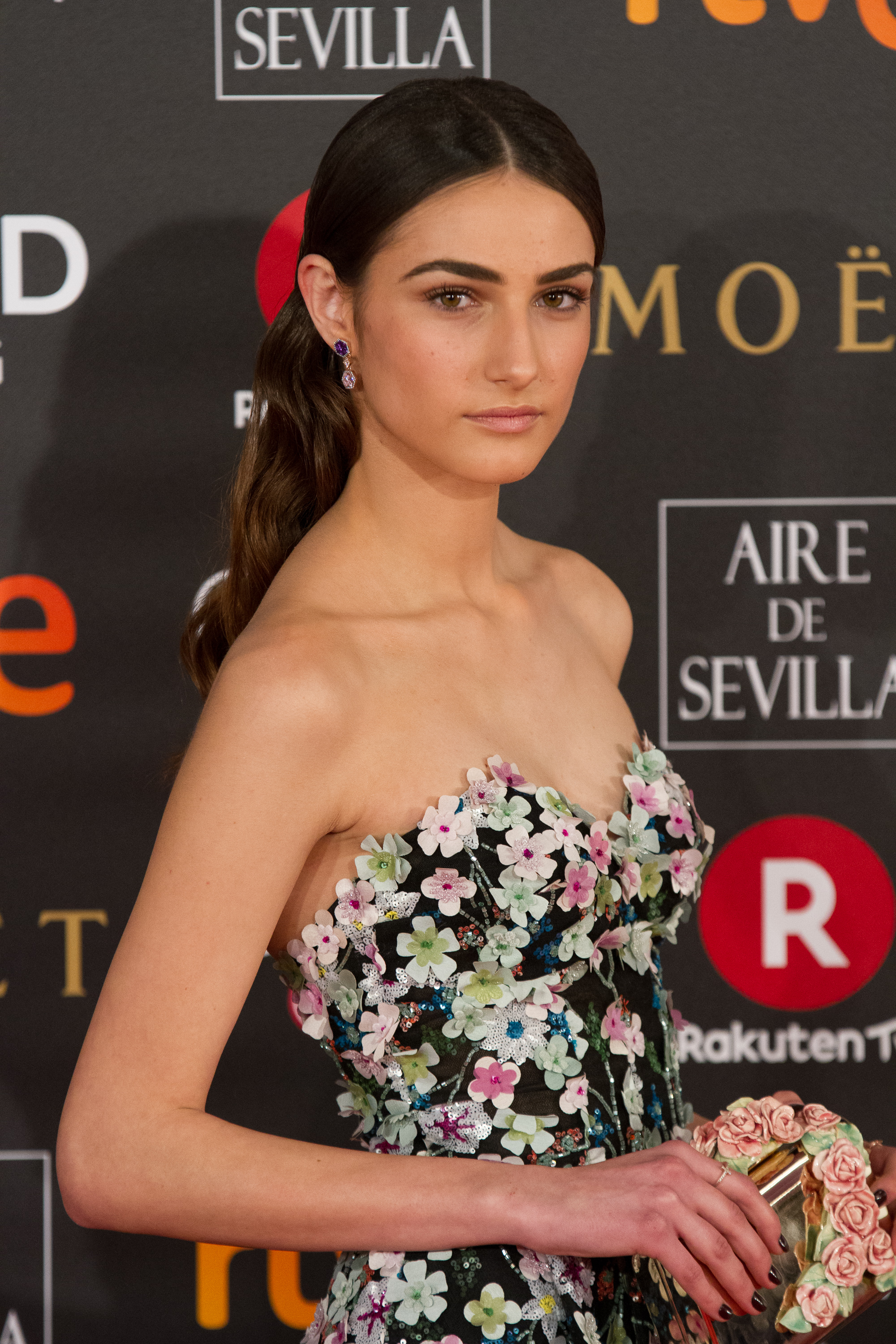
Sandra Escacena wearing a dress with floral embellishments.

In sewing and crafts, an embellishment is anything that adds design interest to the piece.

Embellishments allow individuals to express their personal style and identity. Clothing can be a form of self-expression, and the choice of embellishments can communicate one's personality, taste, and cultural background.

== Examples in sewing and craft ==
=== Appliqué ===
Appliqué is ornamental needlework in which pieces or patches of fabric in different shapes and patterns are sewn or stuck onto a larger piece to form a picture or pattern. It is commonly used as decoration, especially on garments. The technique is accomplished either by hand stitching or machine. Appliqué is commonly practised with textiles, but the term may be applied to similar techniques used on different materials. In the context of ceramics, for example, an appliqué is a separate piece of clay added to the primary work, generally for the purpose of decoration.

=== Embroidery ===
Embroidery is the art of decorating fabric or other materials using a needle to stitch thread or yarn. It is one of the oldest forms of textile art, with origins dating back thousands of years across various cultures. Common stitches found in early embroidery include the chain stitch, buttonhole or blanket stitch, running stitch, satin stitch, and cross stitch. Modern embroidery continues to utilize traditional techniques, though many contemporary stitches are exclusive to machine embroidery.

=== Piping ===
In sewing, piping is a type of trim or embellishment consisting of a strip of folded fabric so as to form a "pipe" inserted into a seam to define the edges or style lines of a garment or other textile object. Usually the fabric strip is cut on the bias. It may be made from either self-fabric (the same fabric as the object to be ornamented) or contrasting fabric, or of leather.

=== Trim ===
Trim or trimming in clothing and home decorating is applied ornament, such as gimp, passementerie, ribbon, ruffles, or, as a verb, to apply such ornament.

Before the Industrial Revolution, all trim was made and applied by hand, thus making heavily trimmed furnishings and garments expensive and high-status. Machine-woven trims and sewing machines put these dense trimmings within the reach of even modest dressmakers and home sewers, and an abundance of trimming is a characteristic of mid-Victorian fashion. As a predictable reaction, high fashion came to emphasize exquisiteness of cut and construction over denseness of trimming, and applied trim became a signifier of mass-produced clothing by the 1930s. The iconic braid and gold button trim of the Chanel suit are a notable survival of trim in high fashion.

=== Lace ===
Lace is a delicate fabric made of yarn or thread in an open weblike pattern, made by machine or by hand. Generally, handmade lace is split into two main categories, needle lace and bobbin lace, although there are other types of lace, such as knitted or crocheted lace. Other laces such as these are considered as a category of their specific craft. Knitted lace, therefore, is an example of knitting. This article considers both needle lace and bobbin lace.

=== Fringe ===
A Fringe is an ornamental textile trim applied to an edge of a textile item, such as drapery, a flag, or epaulettes.

Fringe originated as a way of preventing a cut piece of fabric from unraveling when a hemming was not used. Several strands of weft threads would be removed, and the remaining warp threads would be twisted or braided together to prevent unraveling. In modern fabrics, fringe is more commonly made separately and sewn on. Modern "add-on" fringe may consist of wool, silk, linen, or narrow strips of leather. The use of fringe is ancient, and early fringes were generally made of unspun wool (rather than spun or twisted threads).

=== Bead ===
A bead is a small, decorative object that is formed in a variety of shapes and sizes of a material such as stone, bone, shell, glass, plastic, wood, or pearl and with a small hole for threading or stringing. Beads range in size from under 1 mm to over 1 cm in diameter.

Beads represent some of the earliest forms of jewellery, with a pair of beads made from Nassarius sea snail shells dating to approximately 100000 years ago thought to be the earliest known example. Beadwork is the art or craft of making things with beads. Beads can be woven together with specialized thread, strung onto thread or soft, flexible wire, or adhered to a surface (e.g. fabric, clay).

=== Batik ===
Batik is a dyeing technique using wax resist. The term is also used to describe patterned textiles created with that technique. Batik is made by drawing or stamping wax on a cloth to prevent colour absorption during the dyeing process. This creates a patterned negative when the wax is removed from the dyed cloth. Artisans may create intricate coloured patterns with multiple cycles of wax application and dyeing. Patterns and motifs vary widely even within countries. Some patterns hold symbolic significance and are used only in certain occasions, while others were created to satisfy market demand and fashion trends.

=== Button ===
A button (/bʌtən/) is a fastener that joins two pieces of fabric together by slipping through a loop or by sliding through a buttonhole.

In modern clothing and fashion design, buttons are commonly made of plastic but also may be made of metal, wood, or seashell. Buttons can also be used on containers such as wallets and bags. Buttons may be sewn onto garments and similar items exclusively for purposes of ornamentation. In the applied arts and craft, a button can be an example of folk art, studio craft, or even a miniature work of art. In archaeology, a button can be a significant artifact.

=== Zipper ===
A zipper (N. America), zip, zip fastener (UK), formerly known as a clasp locker, is a commonly used device for binding together two edges of fabric or other flexible material. Used in clothing (e.g. jackets and jeans), luggage and other bags, camping gear (e.g. tents and sleeping bags), and many other items, zippers come in a wide range of sizes, shapes, and colors. In 1892, Whitcomb L. Judson, an American inventor from Chicago, patented the original design from which the modern device evolved.

=== Buckle ===
A buckle or clasp is a device used for fastening two loose ends, with one end attached to it and the other held by a catch in a secure but adjustable manner. Often taken for granted, the invention of the buckle was indispensable in securing two ends before the invention of the zipper. The basic buckle frame comes in a variety of shapes and sizes depending on the intended use and fashion of the era. Buckles are as much in use today as they have been in the past: used for much more than just securing one's belt, instead they are one of the most dependable devices in securing a range of items.

=== Grommet ===
A grommet is a ring or edge strip inserted into a hole through thin material, typically a sheet of textile fabric, sheet metal or composite of carbon fiber, wood or honeycomb. Grommets are generally flared or collared on each side to keep them in place, and are often made of metal, plastic, or rubber. They may be used to prevent tearing or abrasion of the pierced material or protection from abrasion of the insulation on the wire, cable, line being routed through the penetration, and to cover sharp edges of the piercing, or all of the above.

=== Sequin ===
A sequin (/ˈsiːkwɪn/ SEE-kwin) is a small, typically shiny, generally disk-shaped ornament.

Sequins are also referred to as paillettes, spangles, or diamanté (also spelled diamante). Although the words sequins, paillettes, lentejuelas, and spangles can be used interchangeably, diamanté (literally "set with diamonds") is both an adjective and a plural-only noun, which specifically refers to diamond-shaped sequins and can also be used to mean "artificial diamonds", which serve the same purpose as sequins.
