= Floating canvas =

Part of a suit jacket or coat

In tailoring, a floating canvas is a fabric panel sewn inside the front of a suit jacket or coat. The floating canvas adds structure to the front panel of a jacket, and ensures that the jacket drapes properly and maintains its shape over time. It is traditionally made from horsehair, woven together with wool, cotton, linen, or synthetic fibers. The horsehair is used on the weft, and the other fabric on the warp. The floating canvas is loosely handstitched in place between the outer jacket fabric and the inner lining. The stitch used to secure floating canvas is called a pad stitch.

A full canvas is a floating canvas that lies along the entire front of the jacket, from the shoulder seam and lapel to the bottom hem.

A half canvas is a floating canvas that reaches from the shoulder seam and lapel to halfway down the chest. A half canvas is often supplemented with fusible interfacing that provides structure to the remainder of the jacket front. Fusible (or glued) interlinings are considered to be of lower quality than their canvassed counterparts, since the interlining can separate from the main fabric, causing unsightly bubbling.
