= Rantering =

Type of stitching

Rantering is a type of stitching made to conceal a seam line that runs across the grain of the joined pieces of fabric. Rantering stitches take hold of the nap of the fabric and pull it closed over the seam. After this process, the tailor will card or scratch the rantering to blend the nap around the seam with the rest of the fabric. A rantering stitch would also be used in the process of mending a garment to conceal seam lines produced in that process.
