= Wigan (fabric) =

Cotton fabric used for interlinings

Wigan is a stiff cotton material sometimes coated with latex rubber. It is typically sold in bias-cut strips and used as an interfacing or interlining in tailoring to stabilize seams and hemlines. Its name has been derived from Wigan, the name of a former mill town in Greater Manchester (historically Lancashire), England.
