= Felling (disambiguation) =

Felling is the process of cutting trees in a logging operation.

Felling may also refer to:

- Felling, Tyne and Wear, an urban area in England
- Felling, a village and part of Hardegg in Austria
- Felling, the process by which a felled seam is produced
- Donna M. Felling (born 1950), American politician and nurse
