= Ribbon yarn =

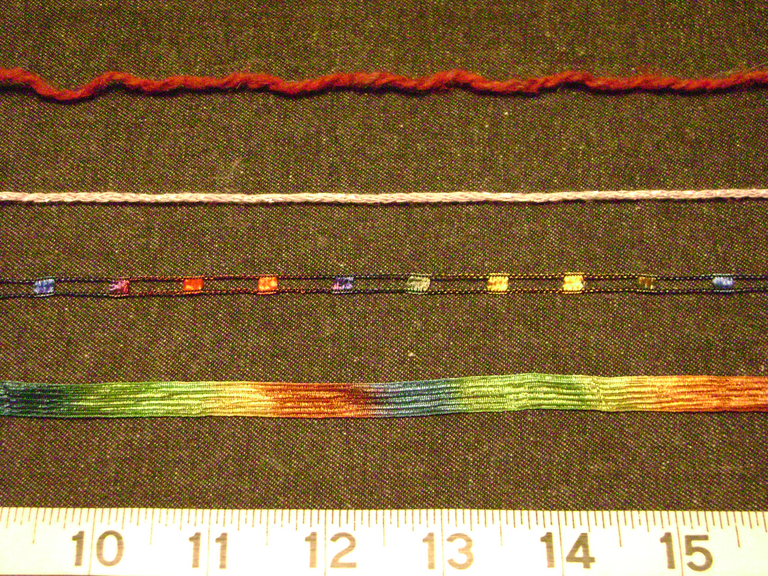
The yarn on the bottom is ribbon yarn

Ribbon yarn or tape yarn is a kind of novelty yarn. It is made of ribbon, but generally not the kind of ribbon used in sewing and millinery. Rather, they are ribbons made especially for knitting or crocheting, with some in a tubular form, some woven flat, and some similar in appearance to Bias tape. Ribbon yarns can be composed of many materials, from synthetics to silk to plant fibers.
