= Eyelash (disambiguation) =

An eyelash is a hair on the eyelid.

Eyelash may also refer to:

- Eyelash boa, a boa species
- Eyelash Gecko, a gecko species
- Eyelash cup, a species of fungus
- Eyelash mite, a parasite
- Eyelash viper, a type of snake
- Eyelash yarn, a type of yarn
- Eyelashes (One Piece), a character from One Piece
