= Morrison Polkinghorne =

Australian textile designer

Morrison Polkinghorne is an Australian textile designer specializing in handmade trimmings and tassels. He and his partner, Robert Carmack, owned a bed and breakfast business in Battambang Cambodia before their business collapsed in the wake of the COVID-19 epidemic at which point they relocated to Australia. Polkinghorne is known for his art which utilizes ink derived from lotus flowers.
