= Eyelash yarn =

Type of novelty yarn

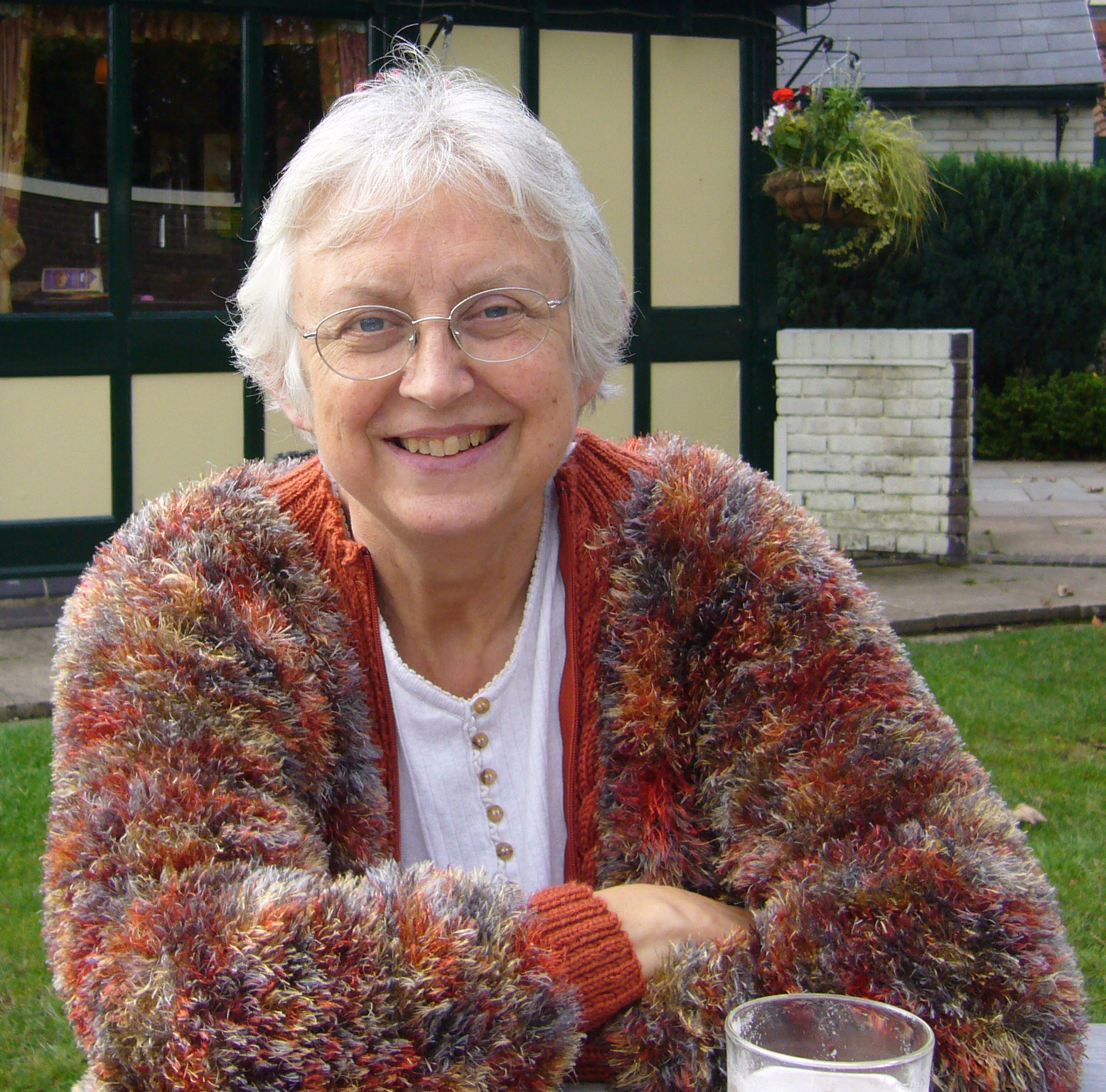
A cardigan knitted with eyelash yarn

Eyelash yarn is a type of novelty yarn. It has a thread base, with several long strands spaced at even intervals that jut out at an angle from the main strand. The long strands, or hair, can be metallic, opalescent, matte, or a combination of types. The hair can be curly or straight and can be different lengths. Prominent types are composed of 100% polyester with a straight and relatively short hair. Because of its thinness, eyelash is normally carried along with another, plainer yarn to add visual interest to the primary yarn.

There are many variations in the texture and composition of eyelash yarns, such as pigtail or ponytail, which have a thicker base and what appear to be flags tied onto the base strand at even intervals, or fur, in which the base has a more frequently occurring or thicker grouping of hairlike strands which, in the finished fabric, will be hairy and have the general aspect of faux fur.

Drawbacks of eyelash yarns include poor stitch definition, because the hairs obscure the appearance of the base. They can also add bulk to a garment. Because of this, they are mostly used for accessories, such as scarves, or as garment trim.

Some types of eyelash yarn can be used for decorative purposes. These types combine metal-look lurex with a polyester core which mimics a tinsel effect but is more durable than typical tinsel and be reused for annual celebrations.
