= Fringe (trim) =

Long or short lengths of straight or twisted thread, cord, or tassel, used as trimming

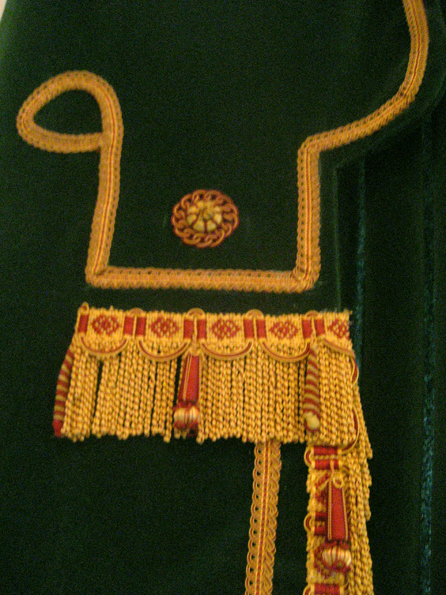
Fringe trim applied to a reproduction drapery design in the Vermont Senate Chamber of the Vermont State House.

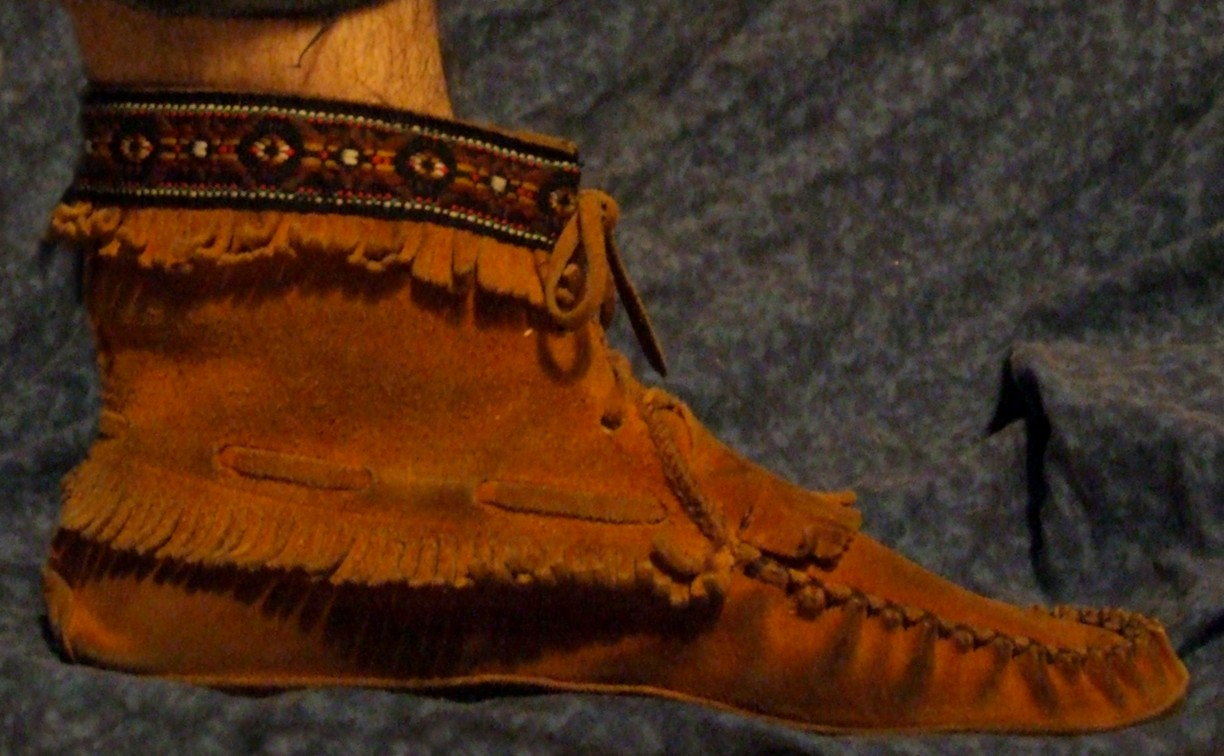
Moccasin with fringe.

A Fringe is an ornamental textile trim applied to an edge of a textile item, such as drapery, a flag, or epaulettes.

Fringe originated as a way of preventing a cut piece of fabric from unraveling when a hemming was not used. Several strands of weft threads would be removed, and the remaining warp threads would be twisted or braided together to prevent unraveling. In modern fabrics, fringe is more commonly made separately and sewn on. Modern "add-on" fringe may consist of wool, silk, linen, or narrow strips of leather. The use of fringe is ancient, and early fringes were generally made of unspun wool (rather than spun or twisted threads).

There are many types of fringes. Particularly in Western Europe, as wealth and luxury items proliferated during the Renaissance, types of fringe began to assume commonly accepted names. Styles of fringes were clearly defined in England by at least 1688.

Types of fringe include:

- Bullion fringe, is a twisted yarn which generally contains threads of silver or gold. The name derives from bullion hose, which had a twisted element at the top that resembled this type of fringe. Modern bullion fringe varies widely in texture and width, but generally is only 3 to 9 inches (7.6 to 22.9 cm) in length.
- Campaign fringe, from the French word campane (meaning "bell"), consists of small, bell-like tassels on the end.
- Thread fringe, untwisted and unbraided loose warp threads.
