= Wrights (textile manufacturers) =

Textile brand

Wrights is a brand of trim and other textiles for home sewing. It, and its subsidiary Lending Textile, operates using Wright, EZ Quilting, Boye and Bondex as brands. Since November 2017, it has been part of CSS Industries.

Wrights was founded in Massachusetts in 1897 as William E. Wright & Sons. Wright & Sons remained independent until 1985, when a group of shareholders—including a grandson of the founder—enabled the Newell Company to acquire a minority share in the company; by the end of the year Newell had achieved majority control and, by 1987, total ownership. In 1989 Boye Needle Company was merged into Wrights. In 2000 Conso International, a South Carolina manufacturer of trims to the wholesale trade and owners of the Simplicity Pattern brand, bought the company. Conso changed its name to Simplicity Creative Group and was acquired by Wilton Brands LLC and, in November 2017, by CSS Industries.

In 2020, CSS Industries, was sold to IG Design Group Americas, Inc.

On June 5, 2025, IG Design Group Americas, Inc. was sold to Hilco Global for $1, who will also profit and receive 75% of all of the company's brands' sales. The company blamed rising U.S. tariffs as part of the decision. On July 3, 2025, IG Design Group Americas, Inc., filed for Chapter 11 bankruptcy protection with plans to wind down and sell its assets.
