= Ladder yarn =

Type of novelty yarn

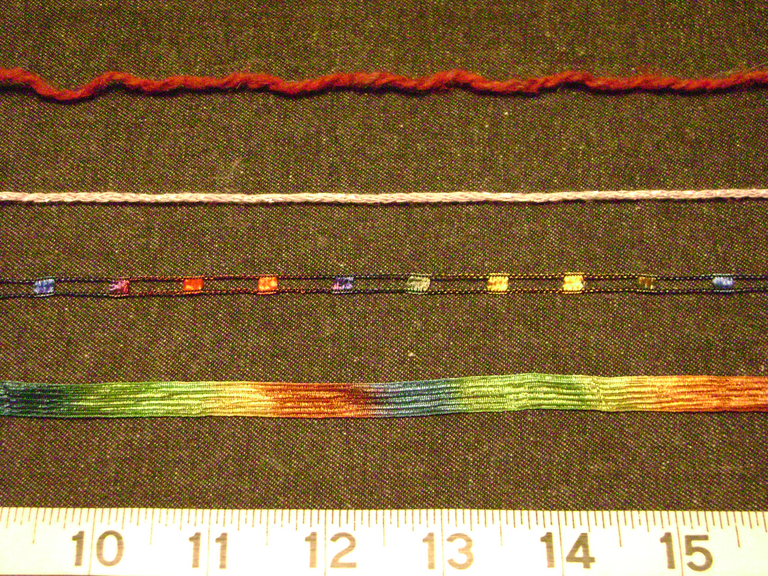
The yarn second from the bottom is ladder yarn

Ladder yarn or train tracks yarn is a type of novelty yarn. It is constructed like ladders, with a horizontal stripe of material suspended between two thinner threads, alternating with gaps. Sometimes a contrasting strand is fed through the gaps to produce another look.
