= Novelty yarns =

Any yarn with special effects introduced in spinning or plying

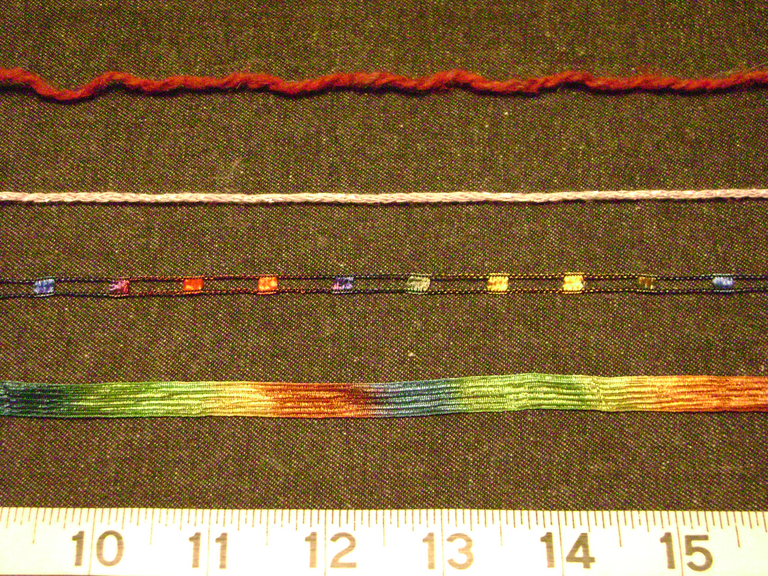
From top to bottom: Regular yarn, braided yarn, ladder yarn and ribbon yarn

Novelty yarns include a wide variety of yarns made with unusual features, structure or fiber composition, such as slubs, inclusions, metallic or synthetic fibers, laddering and varying thickness introduced during production. Some linens, wools to be woven into tweed, and the uneven filaments of some types of silk are allowed to retain their normal irregularities, producing the characteristic uneven surface of the finished fabric. Man-made fibres, which can be modified during production, are especially adaptable for special effects, such as crimping and texturizing.

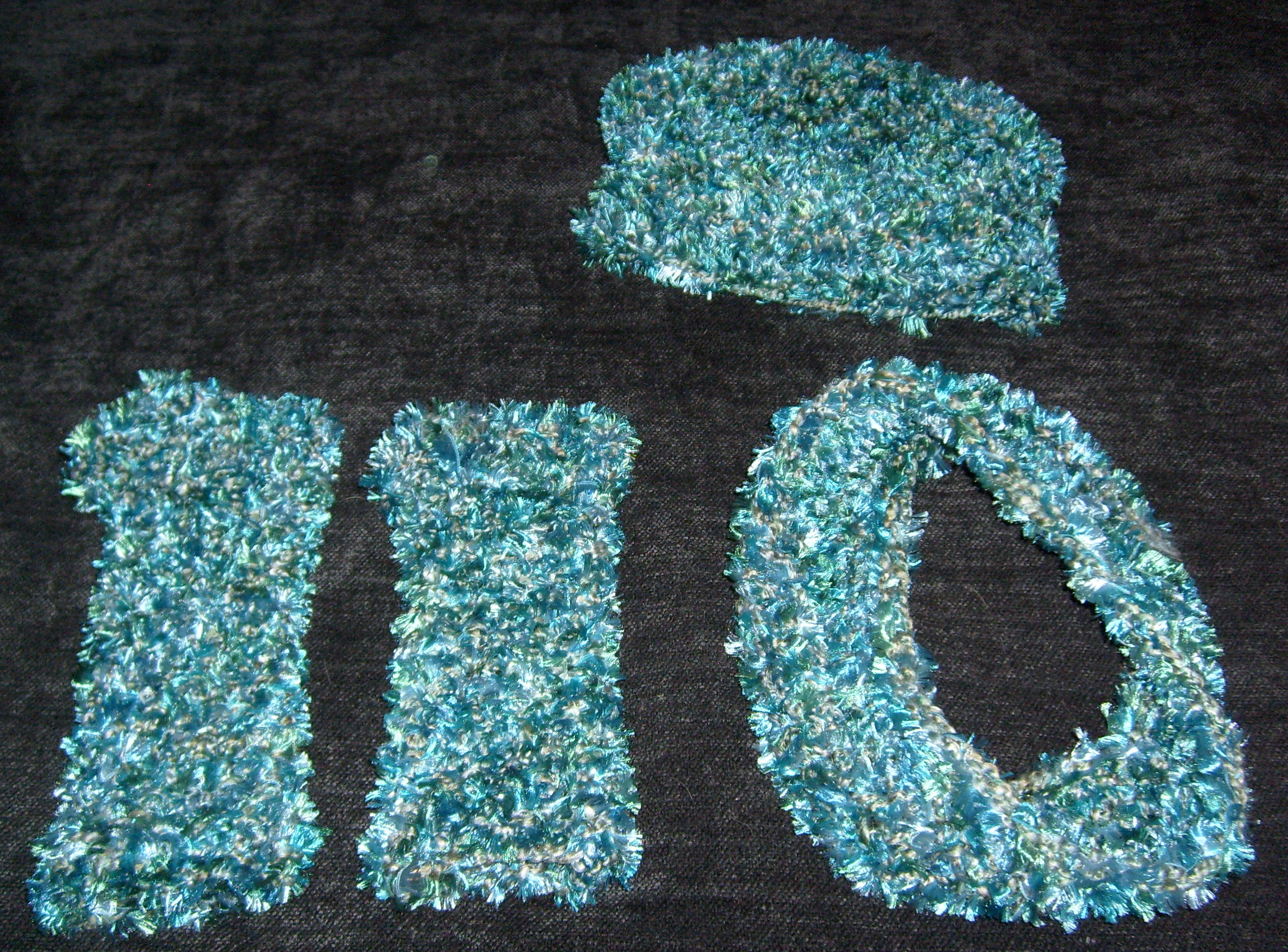
A hat, scarf, and pair of fingerless gloves made from novelty yarn.

== Complex yarns ==
Novelty yarns, also known as complex yarns, add unique textures and visual interest to fabrics. Unlike smooth and uniform yarns, complex yarns can be uneven, with variations in thickness, curls, loops, twists, and different colors along their length. These characteristics are used to create interesting effects in fabrics. In complex ply yarns, two or more complex yarns are twisted together to form loops, curls, and knots, resulting in fancy effects. Many knitting yarns are complex ply yarns, which contribute to the creation of textured finished products. Complex yarns often consist of a blend of fibers, combining synthetic and natural fibers to enhance product longevity or quality. They typically consist of three parts: coreply yarn, effect ply, and binder yarn.

== Types ==
=== Bouclé ===
Bouclé, or looped, yarns are created by loosely looping an effect yarn around a base yarn. They can be made of any type of fiber and are usually composed of three plies, or strands, wrapped around each other. The texture is created by spinning one of the three plies more loosely than the other two. Fiber artists who choose to create projects in bouclé yarn must use extra care because if not handled carefully, the loose strand may split and snag on the knitting needles or crochet hook.

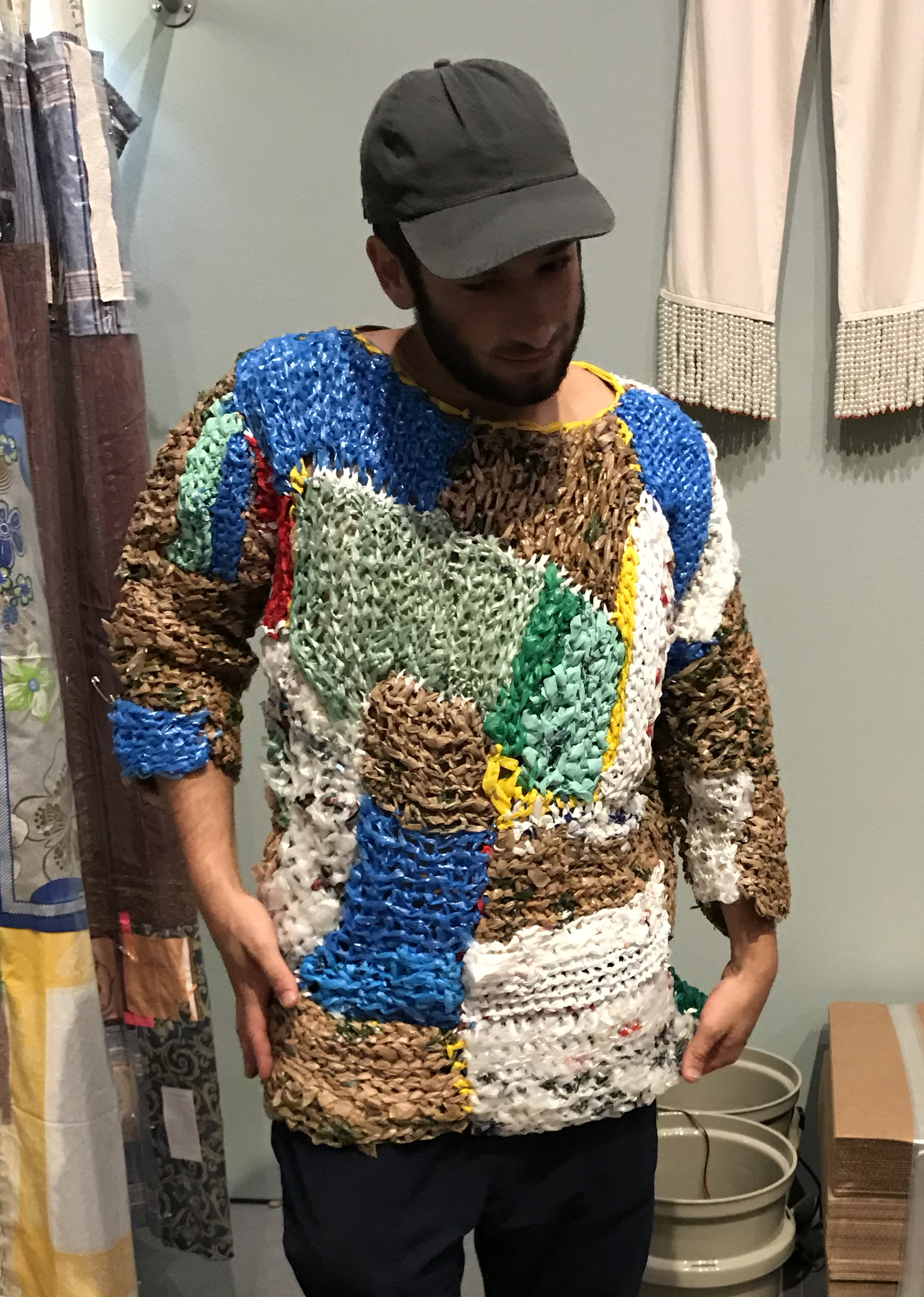
A sweater knit from Plarn (plastic bags) made by the fashion label Eckhaus Latta.

=== Chenille ===
Chenille yarns are known for their soft, fuzzy surface, resembling pipe cleaners. There are several methods to create this texture. One common approach is to produce a fabric first and then cut it into narrow strips resembling yarn. When the fabric is cut, the raw edges become fuzzy, creating the chenille appearance. Alternatively, chenille can be made by trimming a loosely attached effect fiber to achieve the fuzzy texture. Some chenille yarns are also created by attaching or gluing fibers onto the yarn base. Each method results in the characteristic soft and fuzzy texture of chenille yarns.

=== Core ===
A yarn in which the core has been wrapped by another strand, such as of cotton or nylon around an elastic base as used in commercial socks.

=== Corkscrew or spiral ===
The appearance of corkscrew or spiral yarns is achieved by using yarns of two different fibers and often twisting one under a different tension than the other.

=== Crepe yarns ===
Crepe yarns may be classified as fancy yarns and are created by tightening the twist given to a yarn, resulting in a kinked or looped strand.

=== Eisengarn ===
Eisengarn, meaning "iron yarn" in English, is a light-reflecting, strong, waxed-cotton thread. It is made by soaking cotton threads in a starch, paraffin wax solution. The threads are then stretched and polished. The result of the process is a lustrous, tear-resistant yarn which is extremely hardwearing.

Invented in the 19th century, eisengarn was used as a weaving yarn and for making lace, ribbons and lining materials. The yarn is also known as Glanzgarn ('gloss' or 'glazed' yarn) and can be knitted into woollen clothing and other textiles to add shiny highlights.

=== Eyelash ===
Eyelash yarn is crafted from polyester fibers that mimic the texture of eyelashes, giving it a furry appearance. These novelty yarns typically consist of a thin central ply surrounded by short "hairs" protruding from the core thread. Unlike fur yarns, which feature an abundance of threads covering the entire core thread, eyelash yarn has evenly spaced threads at intervals between lengths of bare core thread. This distinctive construction creates a unique texture reminiscent of eyelashes. Eyelash yarns are available in a variety of colors, with the "hairs" sometimes made from multicolored or metallic fibers, adding to their visual appeal.

=== Ladder ===
Ladder yarn resembles a ladder, with two flat threads representing the two sides of the ladder held together by a strip of material at the center that represents the rungs. The material at the center of ladder yarn can be metallic, beaded, or otherwise adorned. This type of yarn is more often used to create trim or embellishments than to knit or crochet entire garments.

=== Metallic fiber ===
Metallic fibers are often classified as fancy yarns and are created by adding a metallic fiber or yarn to the blend. These are not to be confused with actual wire used in jewellery that is sometimes knit or crocheted.

=== Nub ===
A nub is a small bump or knot created by tightly twisting the fiber around the base fiber. The nub is most easily identified when the effect and base yarns are of different colors.

=== Plarn ===
Plastic yarn, or “plarn”, is constructed from plastic bags, large toilet paper and other commodity wrappers (e.g. planting soils sacks etc.); it can be used to weave, knit or crochet plastic mats, baskets, small bags and totes of all kinds.

=== Ribbon ===
Ribbon yarn resembles a ribbon. It can be made from synthetic or natural fibers, such as silk or cotton. Some ribbon yarns are flat, while others are tubular in construction.

=== Slub ===
A slub or thick spot in a yarn is created by varying the tightness of the twist of the yarn at various intervals.
