= Drapery hook =

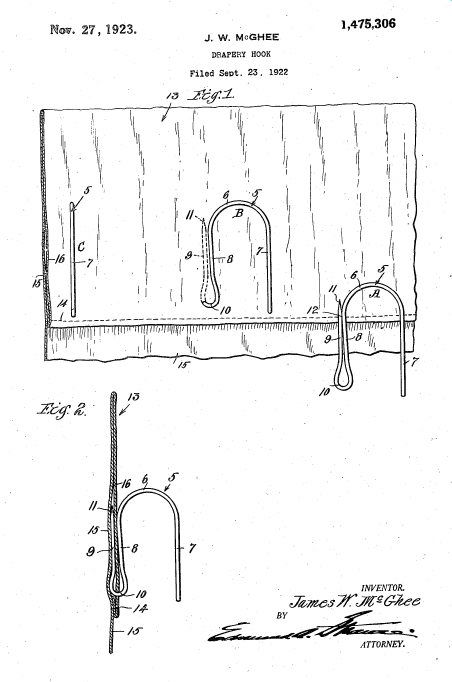
Drapery hook

The drapery hook is a hook designed for hanging drapery. It is often concealed within the drape's header tape The distinctive shape shown in the figure, with a sharp end and a blunt end, was patented by James William McGhee (1882–1968) in the 1920s. Numerous other drapery hooks were patented before and after this common design.

== Patents ==
- U.S. patent RE15263
- U.S. patent 1,334,661
- U.S. patent 1,521,030 image
- U.S. patent 1,475,306 image

== Infringement ==
Patent 1475306 was the subject of an infringement lawsuit that McGhee lost and appealed. He lost again on appeal when the United States Court of Appeals for the Ninth Circuit found that hook designs were not patentable in 1929:

With the lower court, we fail to find in plaintiffs' device any patentable novelty; certainly there is no invention in the hook member. Hooks of all shapes and materials are among the commonest things of life. In size, strength, and shape they are to be adapted to needs and tastes, and the adaptation of a hook to suit the pole, rod, bar, or rings from which the drapery is to hang is readily made by any person of common intelligence. There is no invention.
