= Binding (sewing) =

Method in sewing

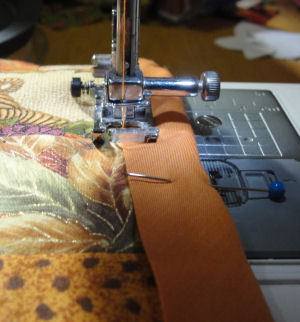
Extra wide double fold bias tape being sewn as a binding for a decorative quilt

In sewing, binding is used as both a noun and a verb to refer to finishing a seam or hem of a garment, usually by rolling or pressing then stitching on an edging or trim.
