= Piping (sewing) =

Tubular strip of textile

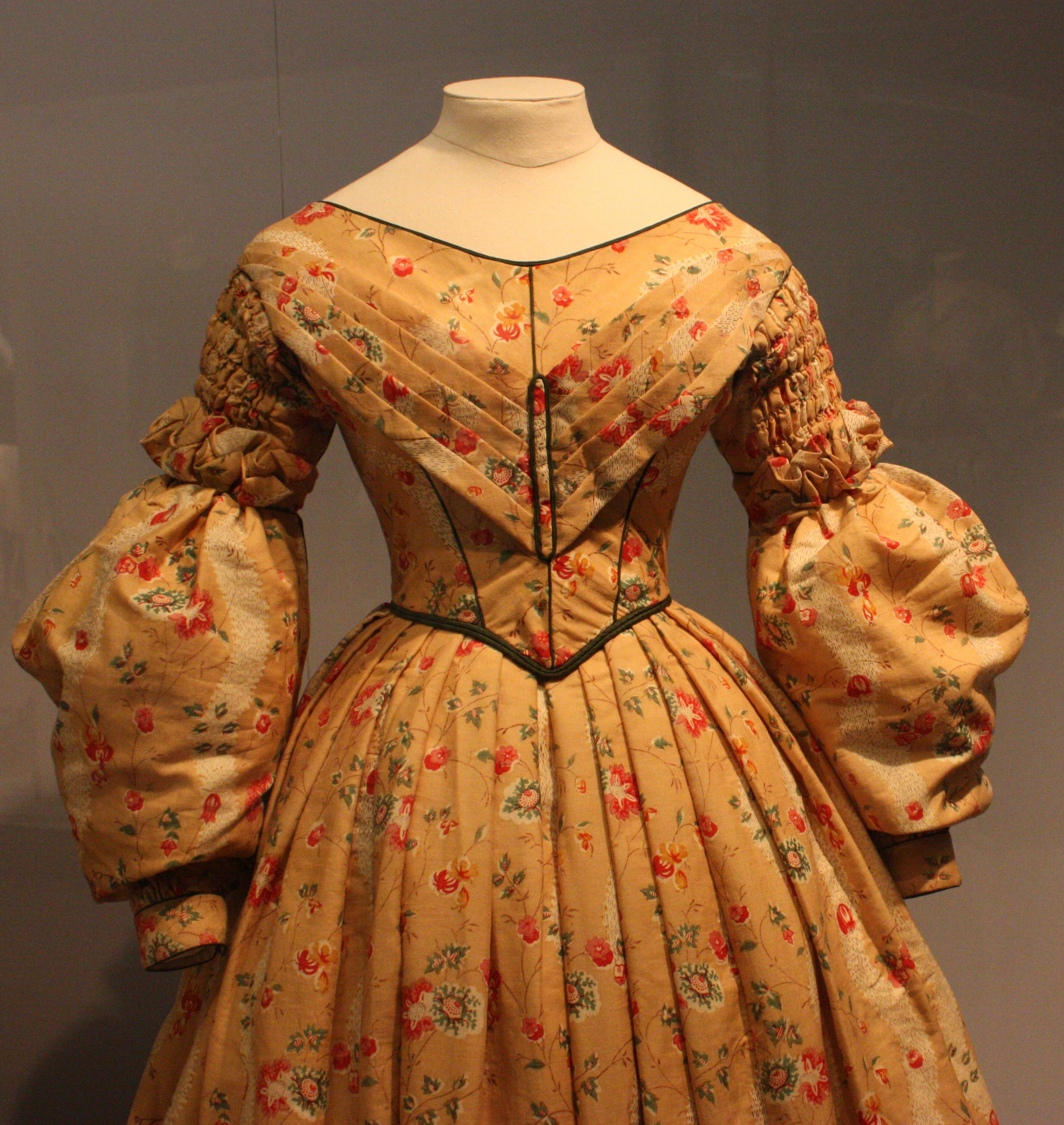
Cotton day dress edged with contrasting piping, 1836–1840, Victoria and Albert Museum

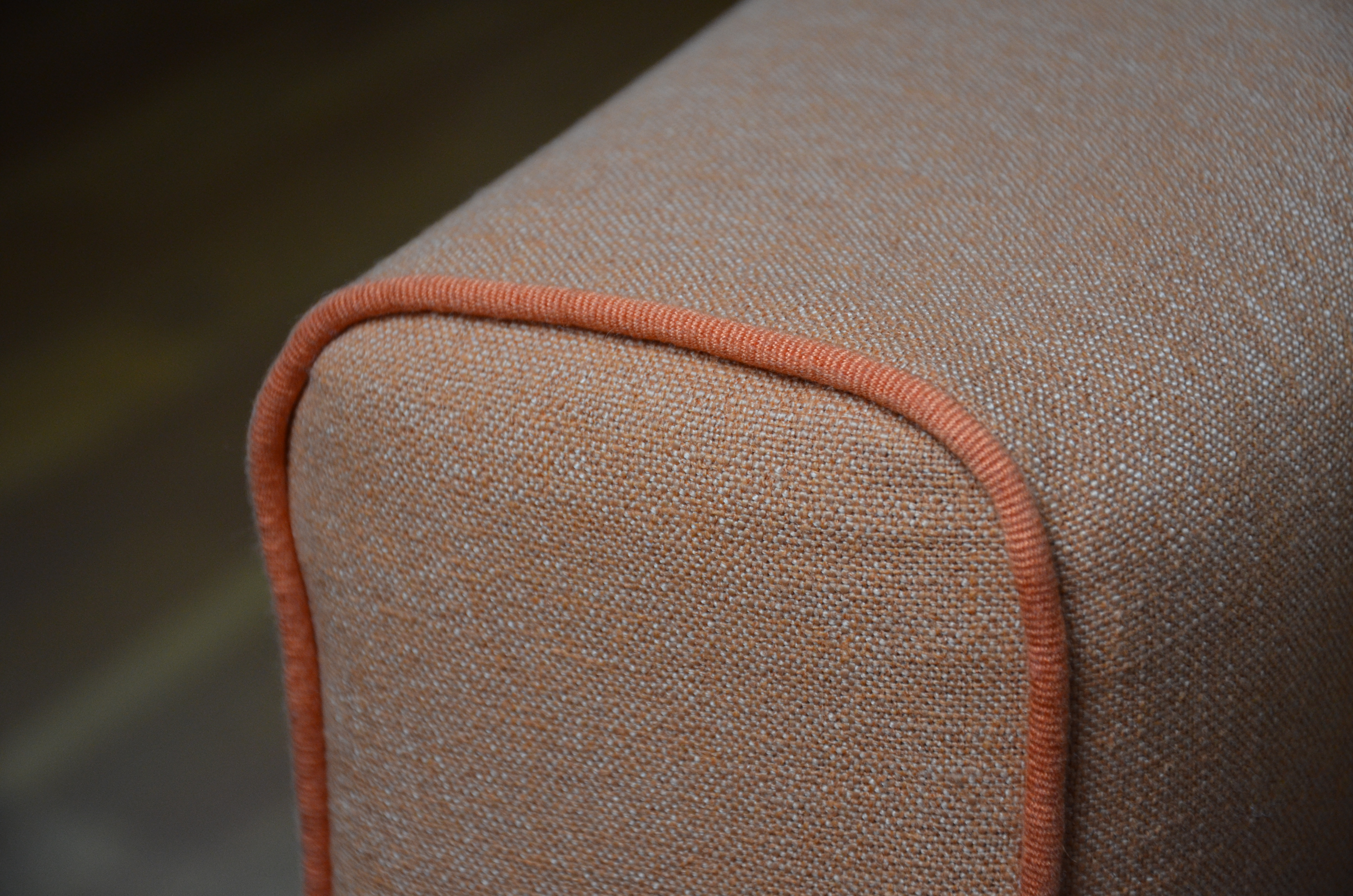
Piping on the armrest of a sofa

In sewing, piping is a type of trim or embellishment consisting of a strip of folded fabric so as to form a "pipe" inserted into a seam to define the edges or style lines of a garment or other textile object. Usually the fabric strip is cut on the bias. It may be made from either self-fabric (the same fabric as the object to be ornamented) or contrasting fabric, or of leather.

Today, piping is common on upholstery, bags, and decorative pillows, but it is also used on clothing. Piped pocket openings, garment edges, and seams are characteristic of Western wear.

== Ecclesiastical use ==
Piping is used extensively on the cassocks of clergy in western rite Christianity, particularly in the Roman Catholic and Anglican churches. Colored piping is often used on black cassocks to indicate rank.

In the Roman Catholic church, cassock piping is: black for priests; purple for chaplains of His Holiness; amaranth red for bishops, protonotaries apostolic, and Honorary Prelates; and scarlet red for cardinals.

In the Anglican church, piping is not used universally, many clerics preferring a plain cassock of solid colour. The most common cassock piping in the Anglican church is scarlet red piping for cathedral deans and canons, and for archdeacons; additionally, bishops may wear black cassocks with amaranth red (usually called purple) piping.
