= Felled seam =

Type of seam in stitching

Cross section of the two steps sewing a felled seam

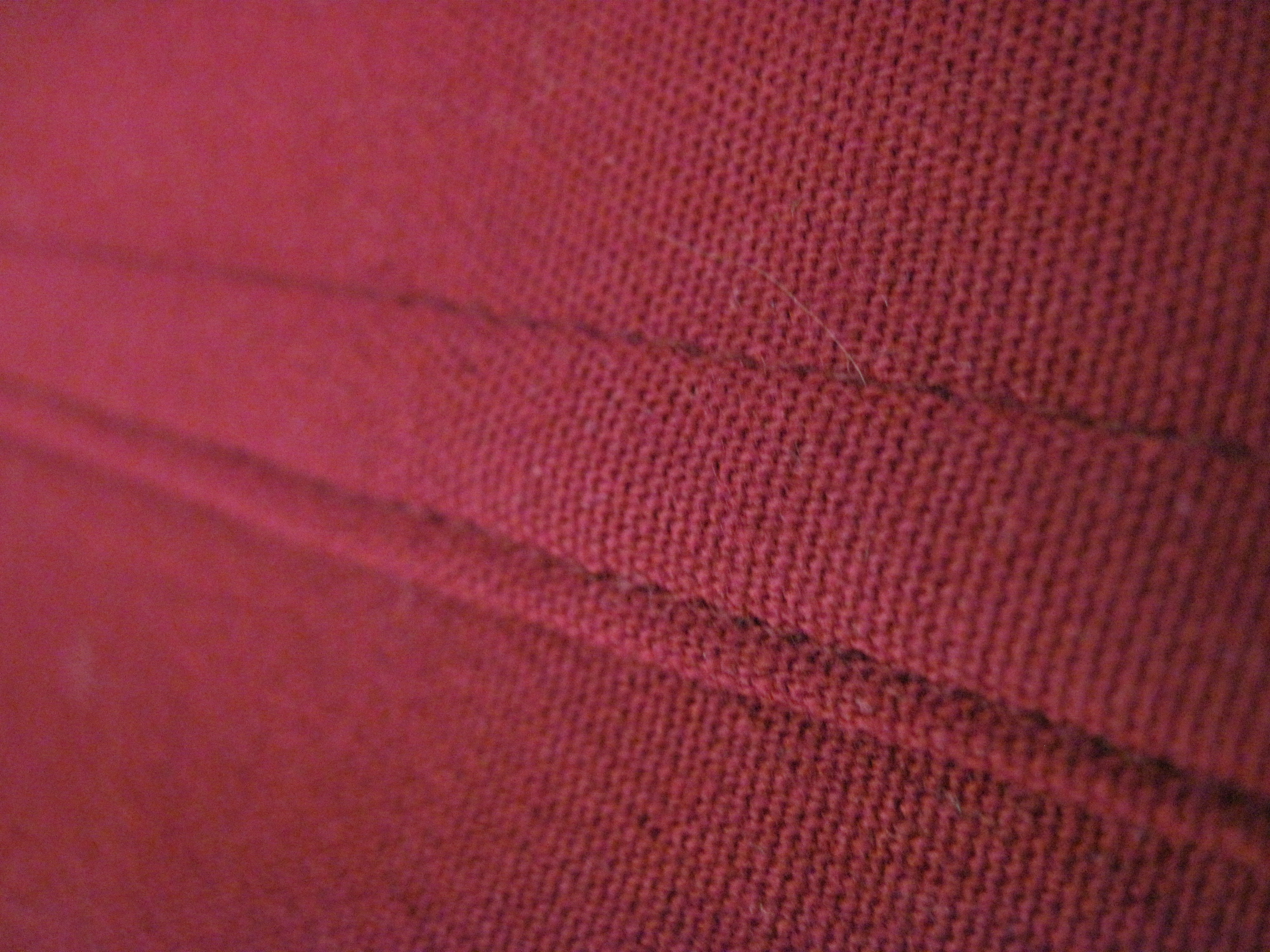
A flat fell seam

A felled seam, or flat-fell seam, is a seam made by placing one edge inside a folded edge of fabric, then stitching the fold down. The fold encases the raw edges, which protects them from fraying. The fold may be secured with a topstitch or a whipstitch. It is useful for keeping seam allowances flat and covering raw edges.

The flat-felled seam is the type of seam used in making denim jeans, although it appears inside-out to reduce stitching. It is also used in traditional tipi construction.

There are flat-felled seams and lap-felled seams, the latter being simpler to sew with the caveat that it is much weaker. A flat-felled seam can be used on various fabrics, including delicate materials such as voile.
