= Lining (sewing) =

Inner layer of fabric, fur, or other material

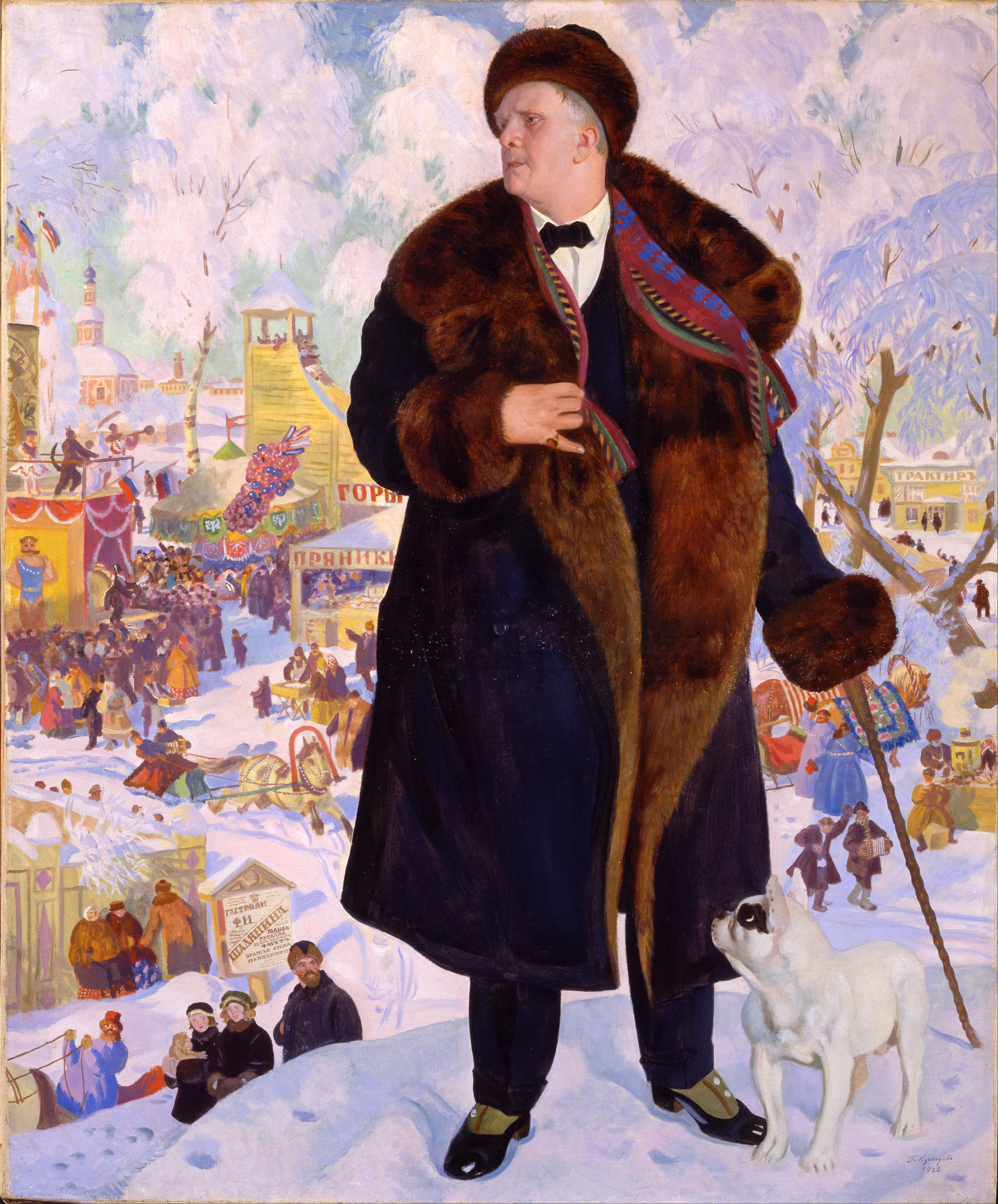
Russian opera singer Feodor Chaliapin in a fur-lined coat. Portrait by Boris Kustodiyev (Portrait of Chaliapin), 1921.

In sewing and tailoring, a lining is an inner layer of fabric, fur, or other material inserted into clothing, hats, luggage, curtains, handbags and similar items.

Linings provide a neat inside finish and conceal interfacing, padding, the raw edges of seams, and other construction details. A lining reduces the wearing strain on clothing, extending the useful life of the lined garment. A smooth lining allows a coat or jacket to slip on over other clothing easily, and linings add warmth to cold-weather wear.

Linings are typically made of solid colors to coordinate with the garment fabric, but patterned and contrasting-colored linings are also used. Designer Madeleine Vionnet introduced the ensemble in which the coat was lined in the fabric used for the dress worn with it, and this notion remains a characteristic of the Chanel suit, which often features a lining and blouse of the same fabric.

In tailoring, home sewing, and ready-to-wear clothing construction, linings are usually completed as a unit before being fitted into the garment shell. In haute couture, the sleeves and body are usually lined separately before assembly.

Some specialized types of lining include the following:

== Interlining ==
This is an additional layer of fabric between the lining and the outer garment shell. Insulating interlinings for winter garments are usually sewn to the individual lining pieces before the lining is assembled.

== Partial or half lining ==
This type lines only the upper back and front of the garment, concealing the shoulder pads and interfacings, with or without sleeves.

== Zip-in, zip-out, snap-out or button-in lining (sometimes called a "liner") ==
This is a warm removable lining for a jacket, coat, or raincoat that is held in place with a zipper, snap fasteners, or buttons. Garments with removable linings are usually lined with a lightweight fabric as well, to provide a neat finish when the warm lining is not worn.

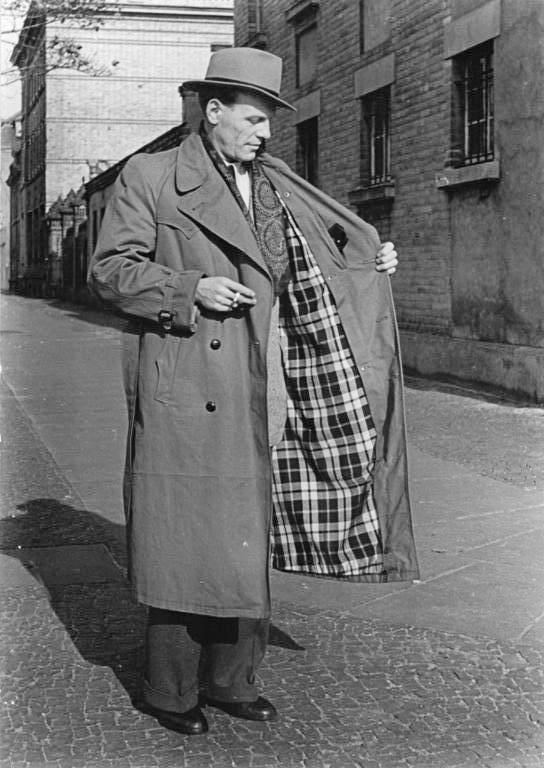
Trench coat with snap-out lining, Germany, 1953.

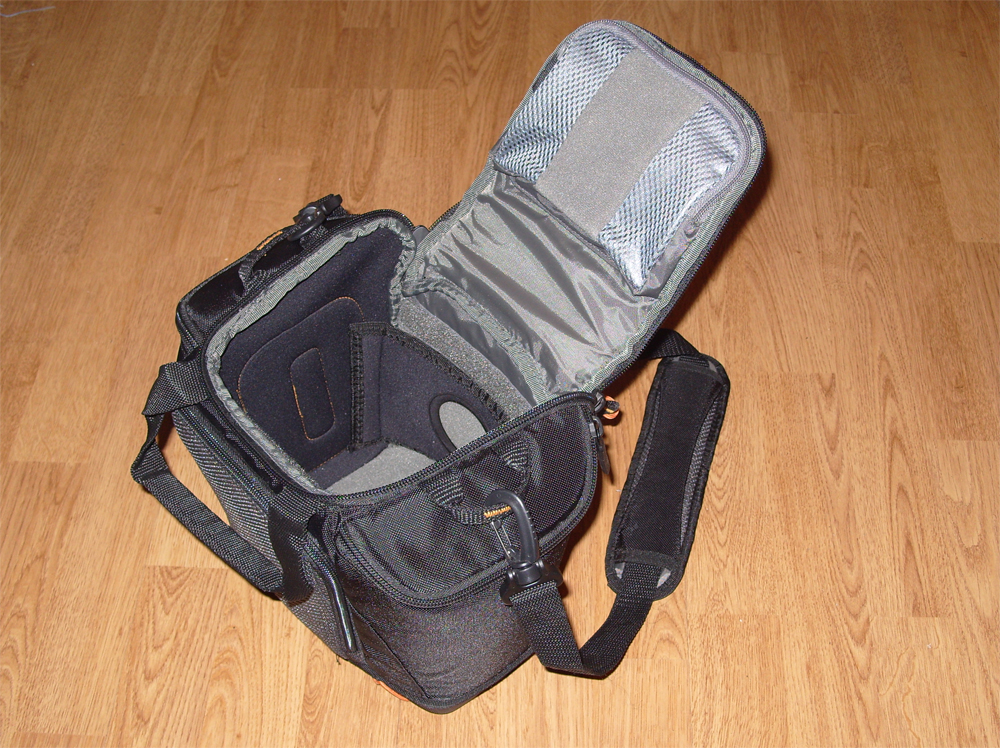
Camera bag with contrasting padded and fitted lining

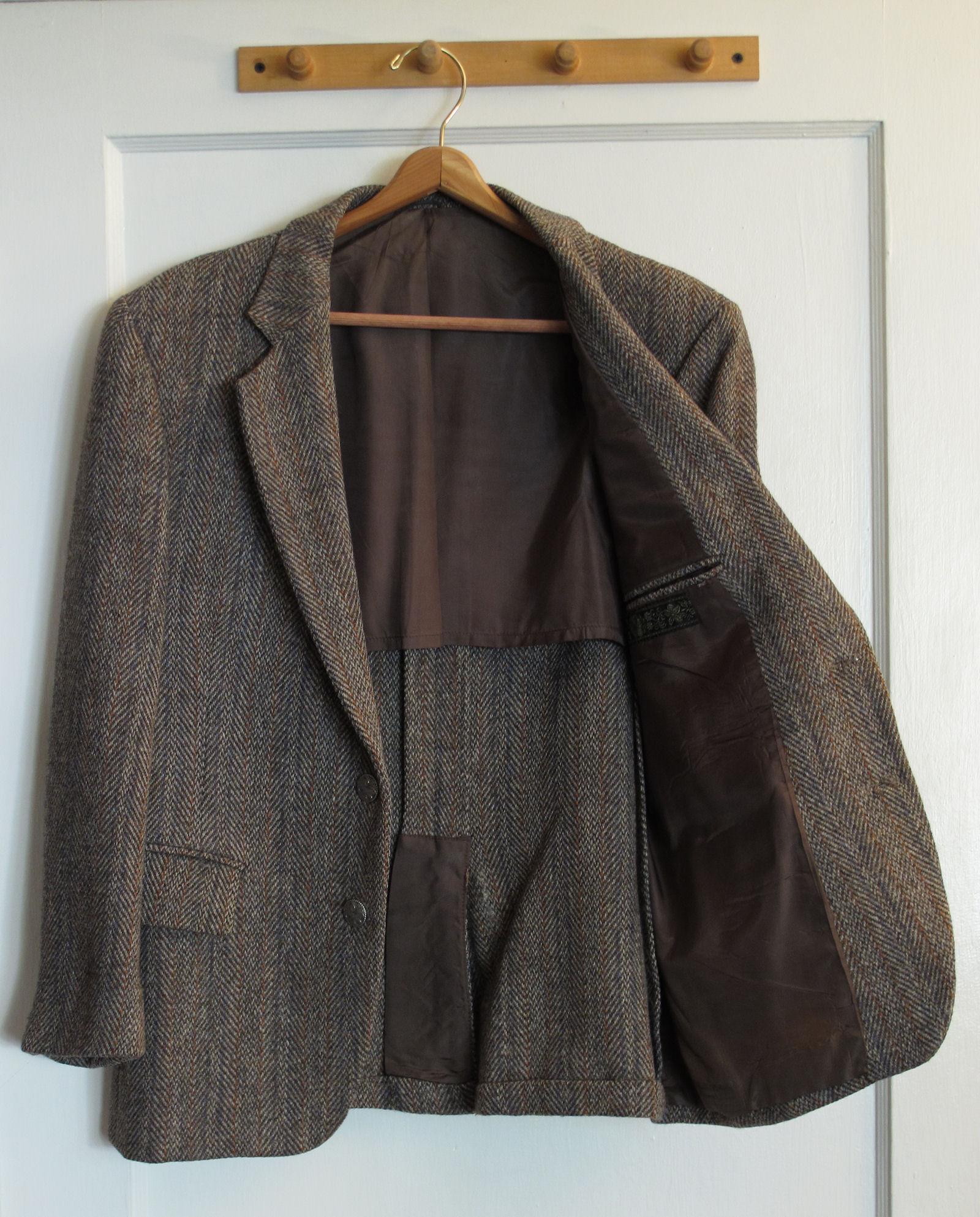
Tailored sport coat with partial lining
