= Bias tape =

Strip of fabric cut on the bias

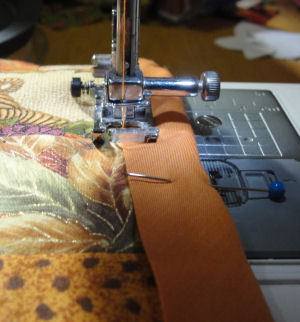
Extra-wide double-fold bias tape being sewn as a binding on a decorative quilt

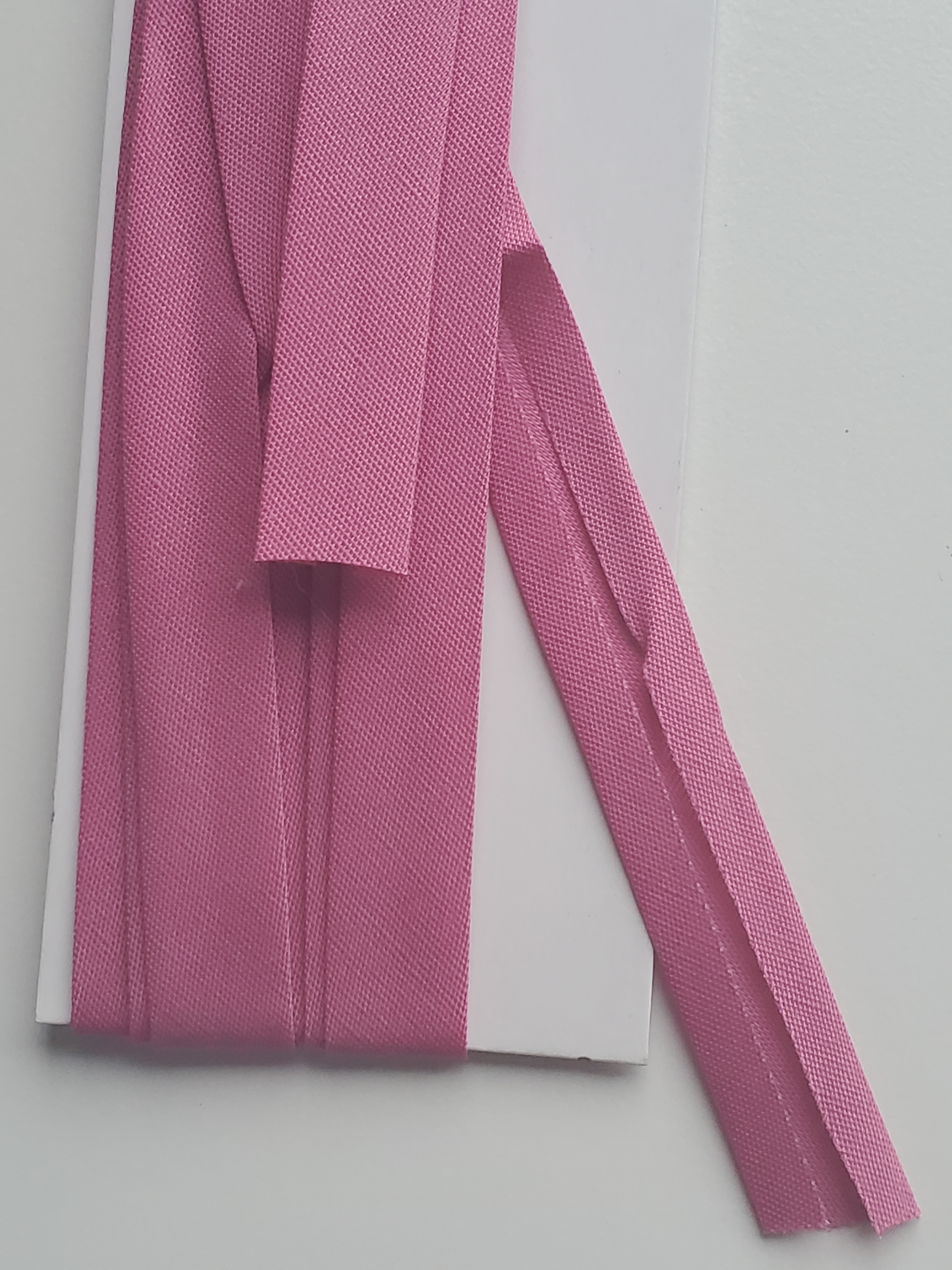
An example of single-fold bias tape

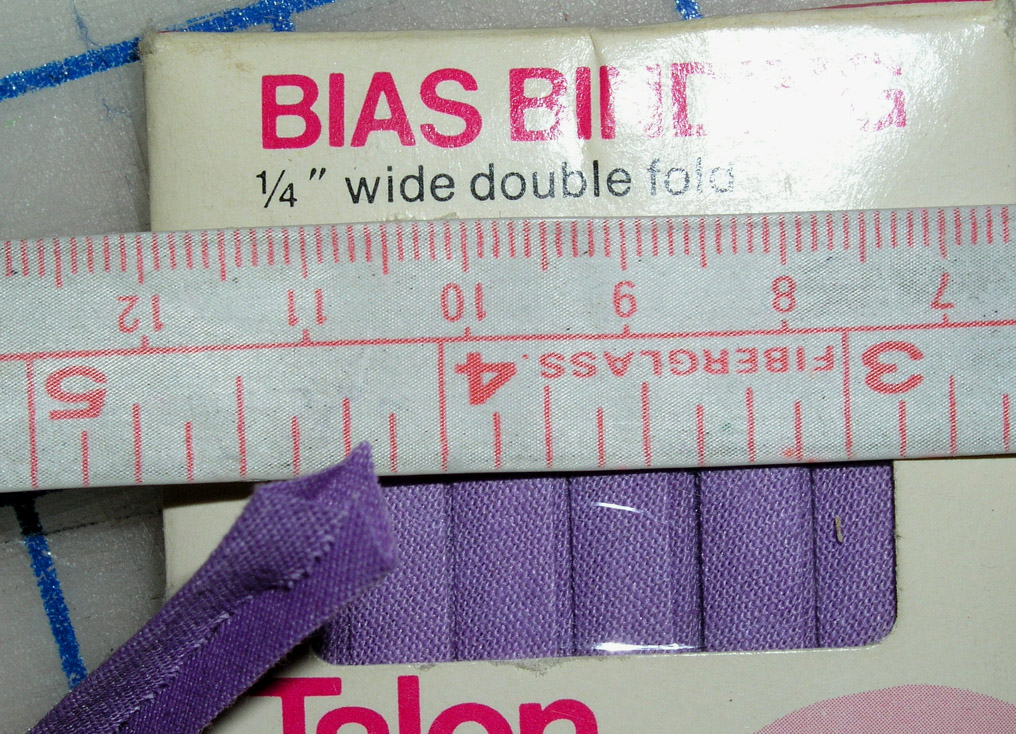
An example of double-fold bias tape

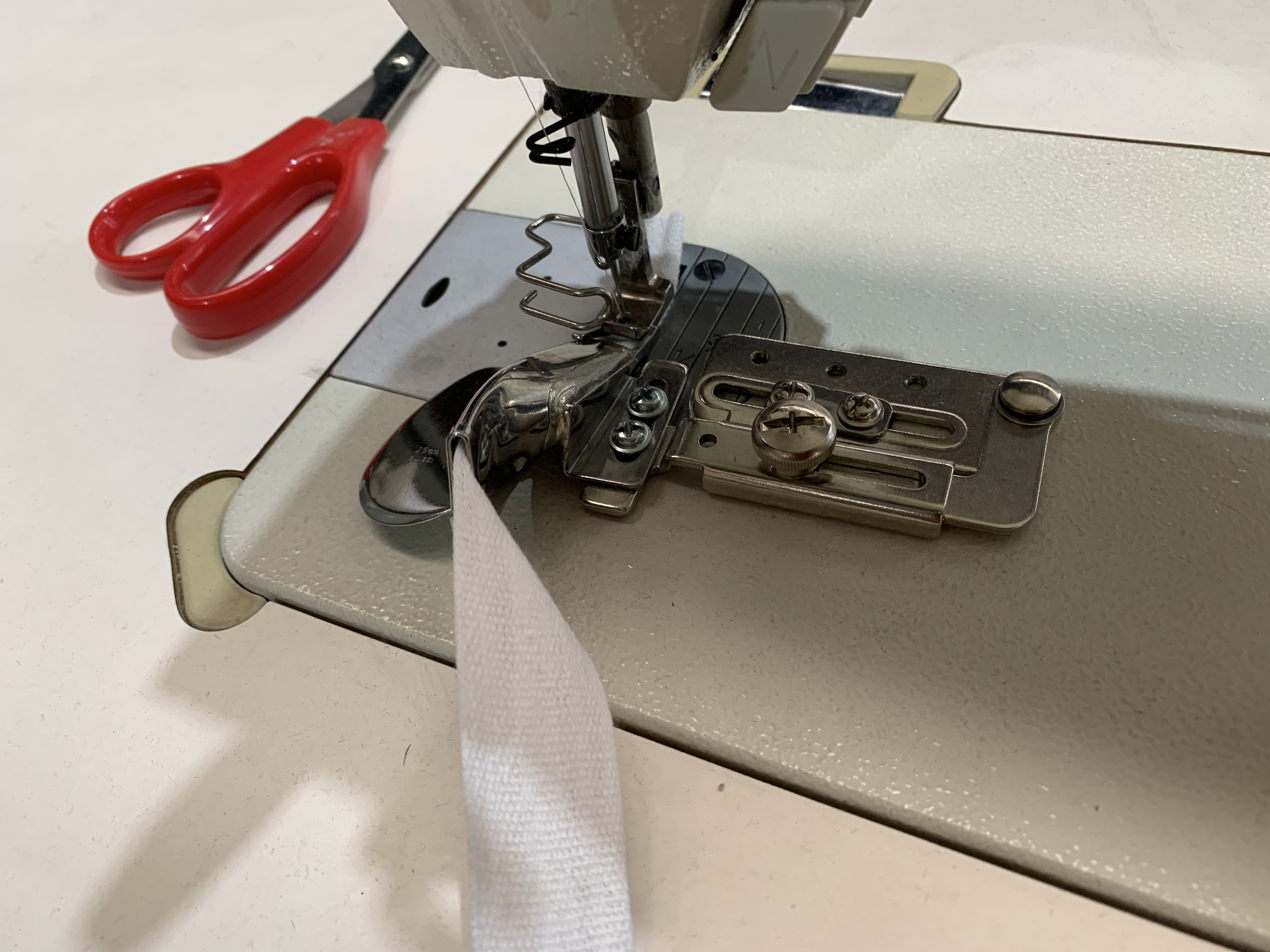
Commercial bias binding foot fed with bias binding, producing bias binding tape

Bias tape or bias binding (Note: This term is not strictly appropriate. There are other uses for bias tape than binding edges (just as there are other ways of binding edges than using bias tape). But the term bias binding is in wide and fully established use – including on packaging of commercial products.) is a narrow strip of fabric, typically plain weave, cut on the bias. As the weave of fabric is at a 45-degree angle, the resulting fabric strip is stretchier than a strip cut on the grain. The strip also has a better drape, and conforms to curves better than fabric cut on the grain.

Bias tape typically comes with each raw vertical edge pressed underneath the strip, meaning that both vertical edges are on the fold. Bias tape may also come folded and pressed in half lengthwise ("double-fold" bias tape), for use in edging garments and pieces of fabric. Bias that does not come pressed in half lengthwise is referred to as "single-fold" bias tape.

Many lengths of bias-cut fabric can be pieced together into a long "tape", which is typically sold in metre or roll lengths by haberdashers. Bias tape varies in width from extremely narrow (1/4 in [0.6 cm] wide when flat) to extremely wide (as wide as 3 in [7.6 cm] or more).

Bias tape is used in making piping, binding seams, finishing raw edges, and is also used decoratively. It is often used on the edges of quilts, placemats, and bibs, around armhole and neckline edges instead of a facing, and as a simple strap or tie for casual bags or clothing.

Devices are available commercially to aid the home sewer in making folded bias tape. The fabric strip is fed through the device, which folds the fabric. The folds are then pressed into place. The resulting folded tape will be 1/4 the width of the original fabric strip.

== See also ==
- Trim (sewing)
