= Pad stitch =

Type of Running stitch made to shape a part of a garment, typically a collar

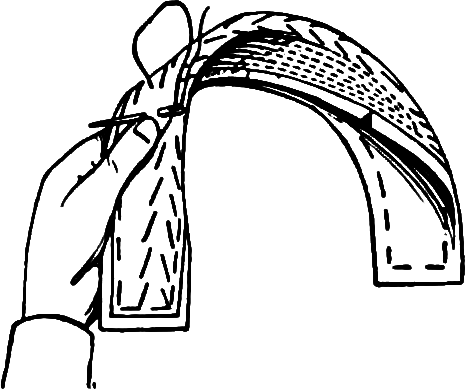
Illustration of pad stitching on a collar

Pad stitches are a type of running stitch made by placing small stitches perpendicular to the line of stitching. Pad stitches secure two or more layers of fabric together and give the layers more firmness; smaller and denser stitches create more firmness. They may also be used to enforce an overall curvature of the layers.

Tailors pad stitch a jacket's lapel and undercollar to give them additional firmness, and maintain their curvature. The line of stitching usually runs parallel to the direction of the most important curve of the layers. For example, pad stitches in a suit's lapel run parallel to the lapel's roll line; pad stitches in the under collar of a tailored jacket run parallel to the collar's back edge.
