= Interfacing =

Textile on the unseen side of fabrics for rigidity

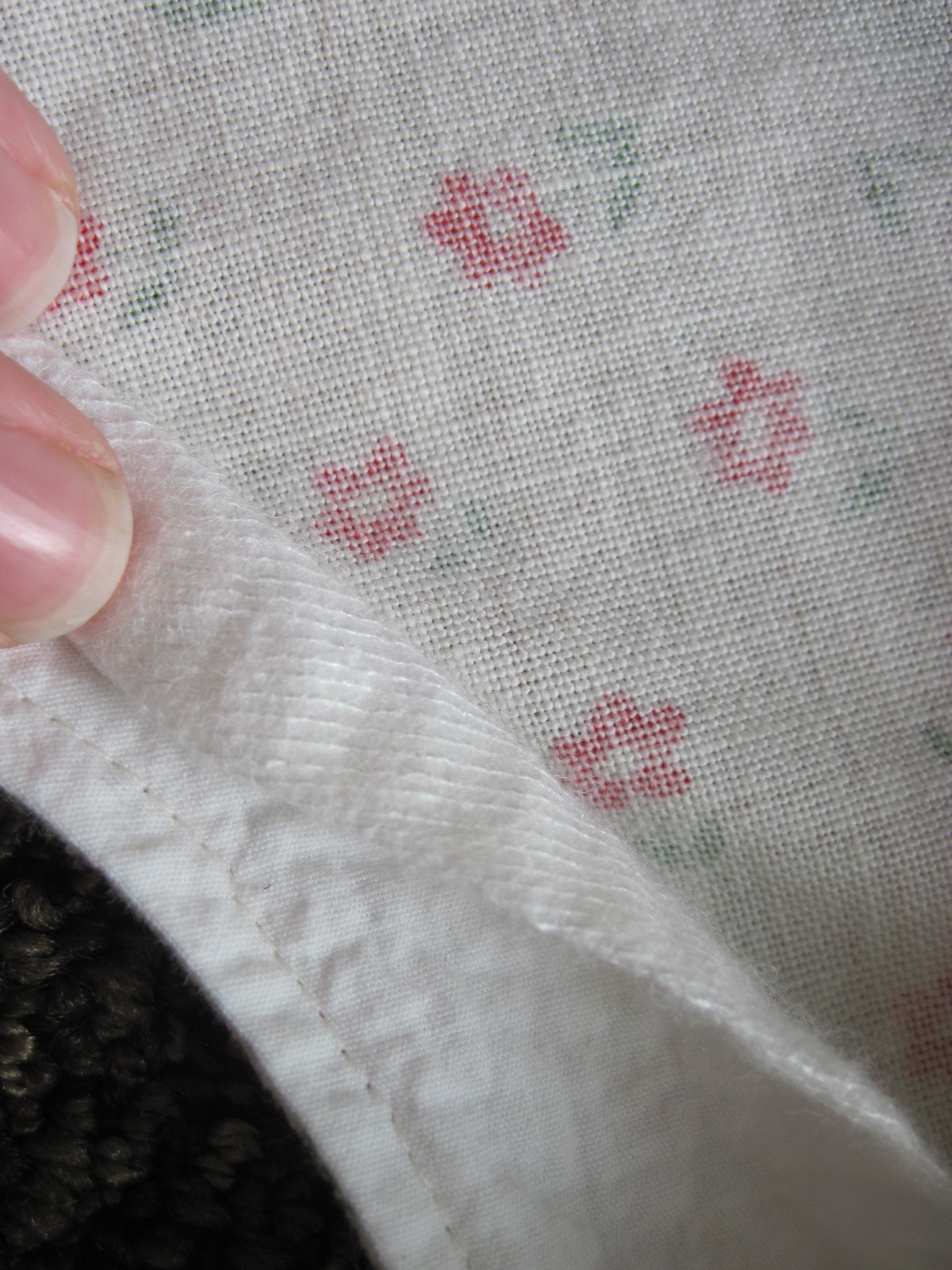
Interfacing used to reinforce a hem.

Interfacing is a textile used on the unseen or "wrong" side of fabrics to make an area of a garment more rigid.

Interfacings can be used to:

- stiffen or add body to fabric, such as the interfacing used in shirt collars and cuffs
- strengthen a certain area of the fabric, for instance where buttonholes will be sewn
- keep fabrics from stretching out of shape, particularly knit fabrics

Interfacings come in a variety of weights and stiffnesses to suit different purposes. They are also available in different colours, although typically interfacing is white. Generally, the heavier weight a fabric is, the heavier weight an interfacing it will use. Interfacing is sold at fabric stores by the yard or metre from bolts, similar to cutting fabric. Sewing patterns specify if interfacing is needed, the weight of interfacing that is required, and the amount. Some patterns use the same fabric as the garment to create an interfacing, as with sheer fabrics.

Interfacing has three main 'types': woven, non-woven and knit. Each is designed to behave differently. Some interfacings are loosely-woven muslin-type fabrics, often stiffened with a layer of chemical additive or starch. A woven interfacing can match the grain of the fashion fabric, enabling it to retain a similar handle and drape. Non-woven interfacings are made from fibres that are bonded or felted together.

Historically, hair canvas, Wigan and Buckram have been used for interfacing. Most are made from cotton or cotton-polyester blends. They tend to be very inexpensive.

== Fusible interfacing ==
Most modern interfacings have heat-activated adhesive on one or both sides. They are affixed to a garment piece using heat and moderate pressure, from a hand iron for example. This type of interfacing is known as "fusible" interfacing. Non-fusible interfacings do not have adhesive and must be sewn by hand or machine.
