= Grain (textile) =

Orientation of the threads

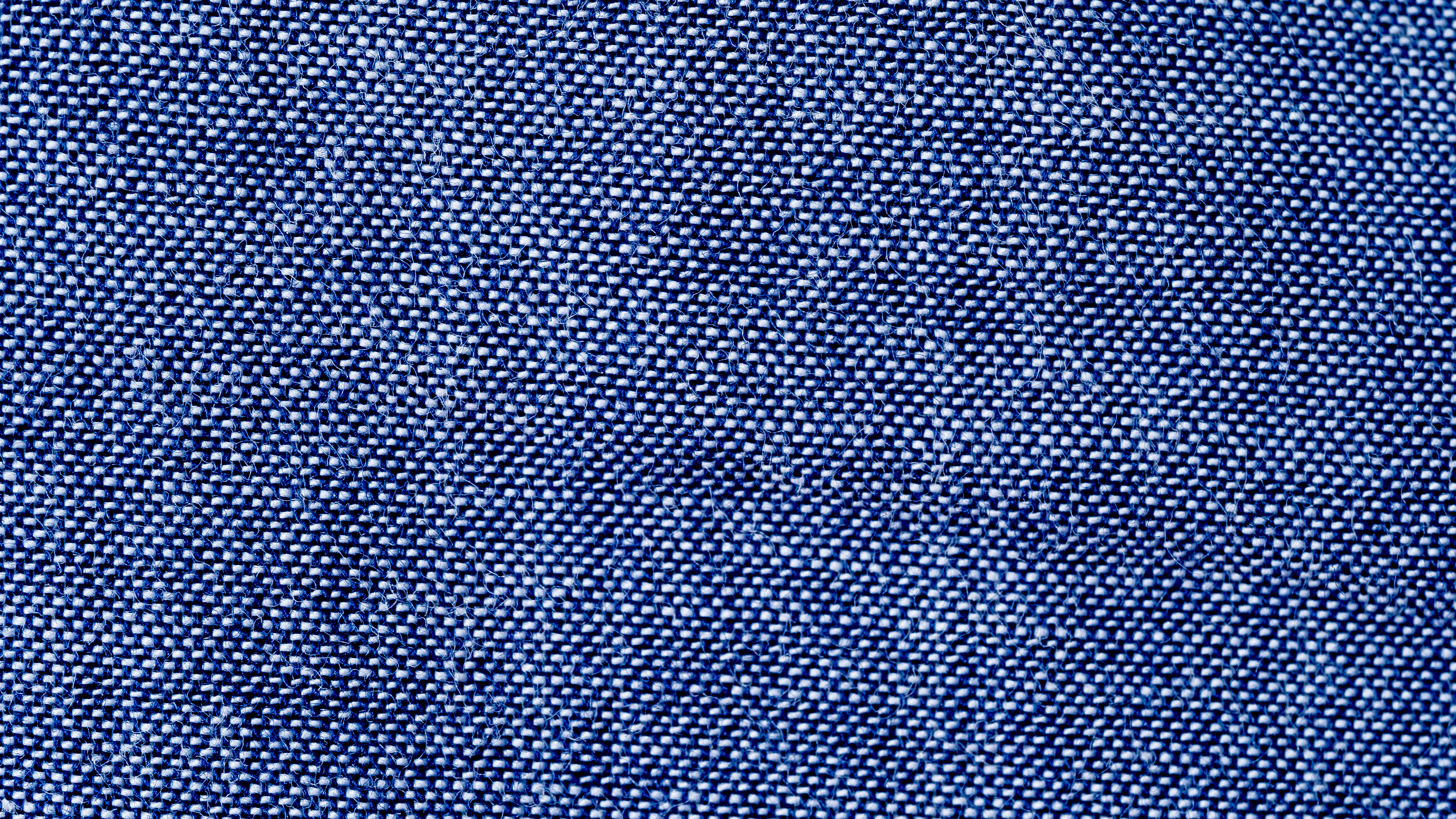
A close-up image of the grain of blue woven chambray fabric

For woven textiles, grain refers to the orientation of the weft and warp threads. The three named grains are straight grain, cross grain, and the bias grain. In sewing, a pattern piece can be cut from fabric in any orientation, and the chosen grain or orientation will affect the way the fabric hangs and stretches and thus the fit of a garment. Generally speaking a piece is said to be cut on a particular grain when the longest part of the pattern or the main seams of the finished piece are aligned with that grain. Non-woven materials such as felt, interfacing or leather do not have a grain in the textile sense.

== Straight grain ==
The straight grain is oriented parallel with the warp threads and the selvedge. The straight grain typically has less stretch than the cross grain since the warp threads will be pulled tighter than the weft during weaving. Most garments are cut with the straight grain oriented top to bottom.

== Cross grain ==
The cross grain runs perpendicular to the selvedge and parallel to the weft threads. The cross grain generally has more stretch than the straight grain since the weft threads are generally looser than the warp during weaving. Most garments (like pants or shirts) are cut on the straight grain with the cross grain parallel to the floor when the wearer is standing. This allows more stretch through the width of the garment, such as in a pant leg which needs more circumferential than vertical stretch. Garments are sometimes cut on the cross grain, generally because the pieces are too wide to fit on the straight grain.

== Bias ==
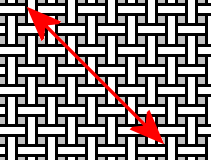
"True bias" of cloth

The bias grain of a piece of woven fabric, usually referred to simply as "the bias", is any grain that falls between the straight and cross grains. When the grain is at 45 degrees to its warp and weft threads it is referred to as "true bias." Every piece of woven fabric has two biases, perpendicular to each other. A garment made of woven fabric is said to be "cut on the bias" when the fabric's warp and weft threads are on one of the bias grains. Woven fabric is more elastic as well as more fluid in the bias direction, compared to the straight and cross grains. This property facilitates garments and garment details that require extra elasticity, drapeability or flexibility, such as bias-cut skirts and dresses, neckties, piping trims and decorations, and bound seams.

The "bias cut" is a technique used by designers for cutting clothing to utilize the greater stretch in the bias or diagonal direction of the fabric, thereby causing it to accentuate body lines and curves and drape softly. A full-skirted dress cut on the bias will hang more gracefully; a narrow dress will cling to the figure. Before the 20th century, bias cut was rare in women's clothing and in men's garments was highly unconventional. In the Middle Ages, before the development of knitting, hose were cut on the bias in order to make them fit better. In the early 19th century, the specially designed clothing of the dandy and celebrity chef Alexis Soyer were remarked upon by George Augustus Sala, who described how "every article of his attire... was cut on what dressmakers call a 'bias', or as he himself used to designate as à la zoug-zoug."

The bias cut rose to prominence in 1930s fashion through the work of French couturière Madeleine Vionnet, who had championed the technique since the 1920s. Vionnet—who called herself an "enemy of fashion" and believed the female body was its own best support structure—pioneered the use of the bias cut to create evening dresses that fitted the body without excessive elaboration, employing a flowing and elegant line through the draping of chiffon, silk, and crêpe. By the early 1930s the technique had become widely adopted across the fashion industry, defining the decade's signature evening look of sleek, low-backed satin gowns that hugged the body's curves and flared at the hem. Bias-cut styles have been revived periodically since.

== See also ==
- Bias tape
