= Trim (sewing) =

Ornaments in sewing

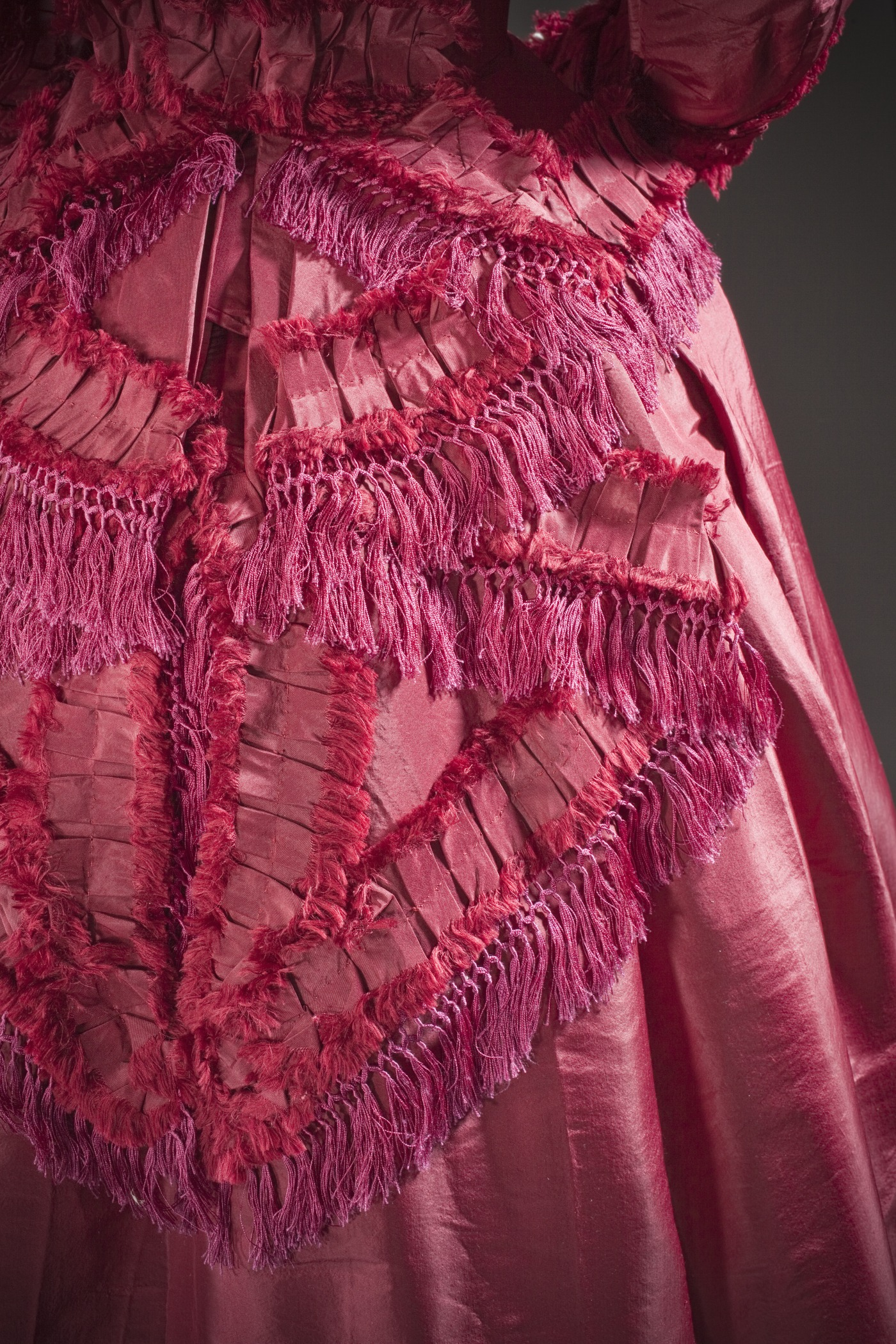
Red fringe trim on a woman's dress c. 1870.

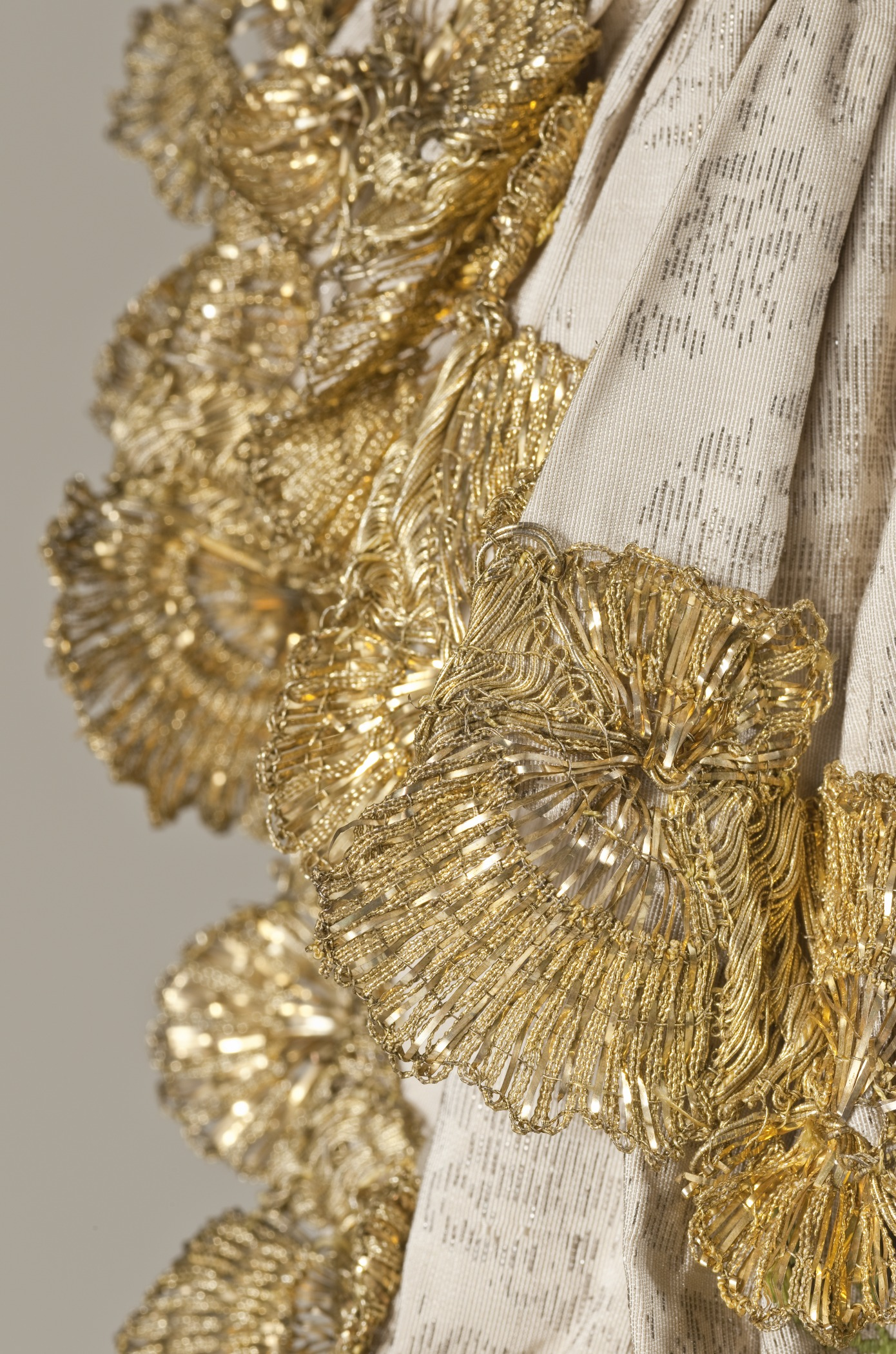
Elaborate gold metallic lace trim c. 1760–65.

Trim or trimming in clothing and home decorating is applied ornament, such as gimp, passementerie, ribbon, ruffles, or, as a verb, to apply such ornament.

Before the Industrial Revolution, all trim was made and applied by hand, thus making heavily trimmed furnishings and garments expensive and high-status. Machine-woven trims and sewing machines put these dense trimmings within the reach of even modest dressmakers and home sewers, and an abundance of trimming is a characteristic of mid-Victorian fashion. As a predictable reaction, high fashion came to emphasize exquisiteness of cut and construction over denseness of trimming, and applied trim became a signifier of mass-produced clothing by the 1930s. The iconic braid and gold button trim of the Chanel suit are a notable survival of trim in high fashion.

In home decorating, the 1980s and 1990s saw a fashion for dense, elaborately layered trimmings on upholstered furniture and drapery.

Today, most trimmings are commercially manufactured. Scalamandré is known for elaborate trim for home furnishings, and Wrights is a manufacturer of trim for home sewing and crafts. Conso is another leading manufacturer.

== See also ==
- Bias tape – Strip of fabric cut on the bias
- Braid – Structure of strands of flexible material
- Buttons
- Cord (sewing)
- Gimp (thread) – Narrow yarn of thread wrapped around a core
- Lace – Openwork fabric, patterned with open holes in the work, made by machine or by hand
- Passementerie – Elaborate braids and other trimmings
- Piping (sewing) – Tubular strip of textile
- Ribbon – Long and narrow band of material
- Rickrack – Braided zigzag trim used in clothes or curtains
- Ruffles – Strip of fabric, lace, or ribbon gathered on one edge and applied as trimming
- Tassels
