= Nun's veiling =

Lightweight, thin, sheer, wool cloth

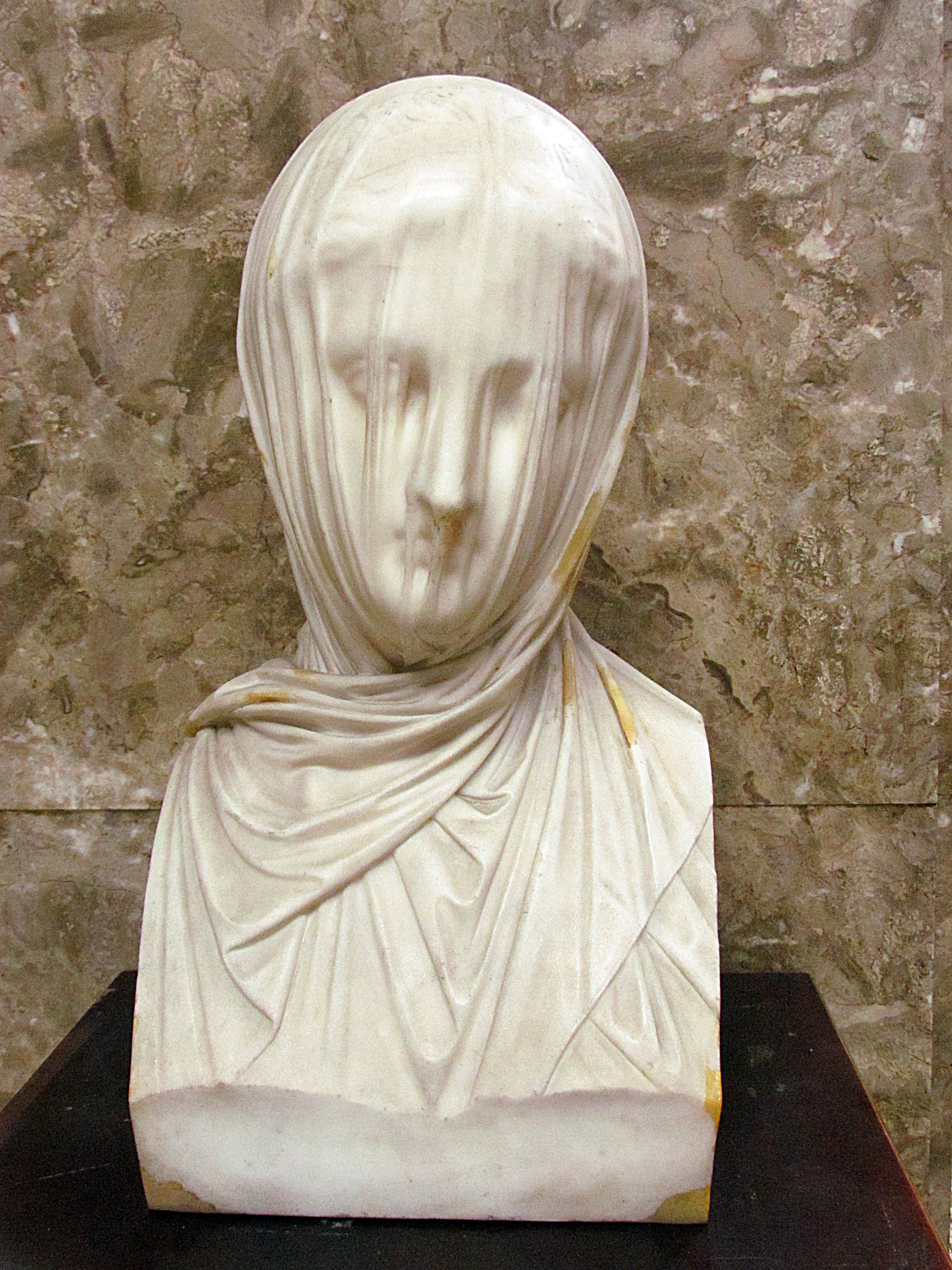
The depiction of veil

Nun's veiling is a lightweight cloth made of wool. It is a plain weave fabric used mainly for women's veils and dresses. Nun's veiling got its name from the fact that it was used in veils by several religious orders.

== Structure ==
Nun's veiling was a lightweight, soft, thin, sheer, wool cloth with an open weave structure. The construction was more open than a woolen batiste cloth. There were also variants in silk, cotton and mixed materials.

== Use ==
Nun's veiling was used in ladies' toilettes, as a flounce fabric and in a variety of outfits for English women in the 19th century.

== See also ==
- Katharine Cornell
- The Veiled Nun
