= 19th century in fashion =

The nineteenth century marks the period beginning January 1, 1801, and ends December 31, 1900.

It was a period of dramatic change and rapid socio-cultural advancement, where society and culture are constantly changing with advancement of time.

The technology, art, politics, and culture of the 19th century were strongly reflected in the styles and silhouettes of the era's clothing.

For women, fashion was an extravagant and extroverted display of the female silhouette with corset pinched waistlines, bustling full-skirts that flowed in and out of trend and decoratively embellished gowns. For men, three piece suits were tailored for usefulness in business as well as sporting activity.

The fashion in this article includes styles from the 19th century through a Western context – namely Europe and North America.

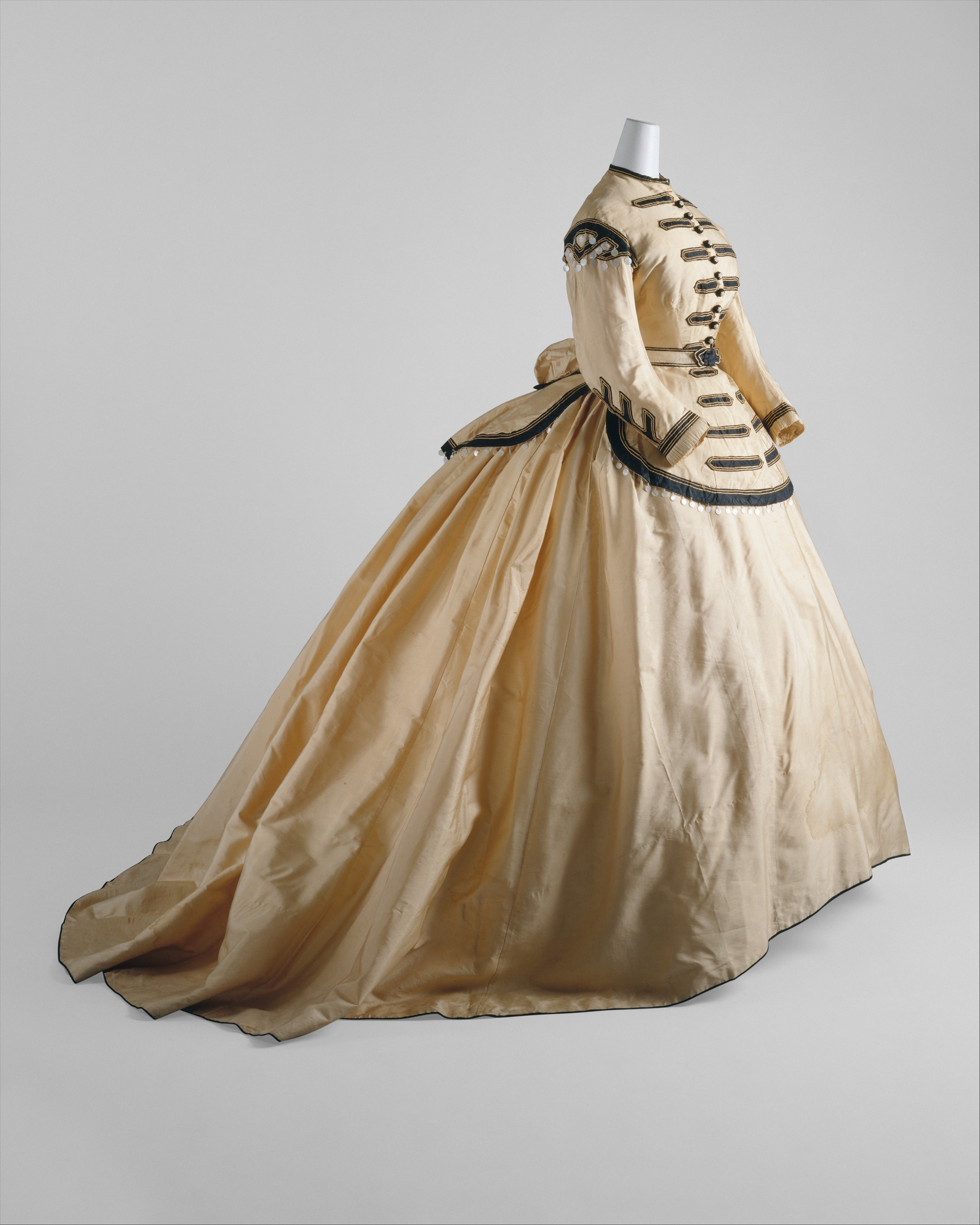
American woman's dress, 1860 - 1865

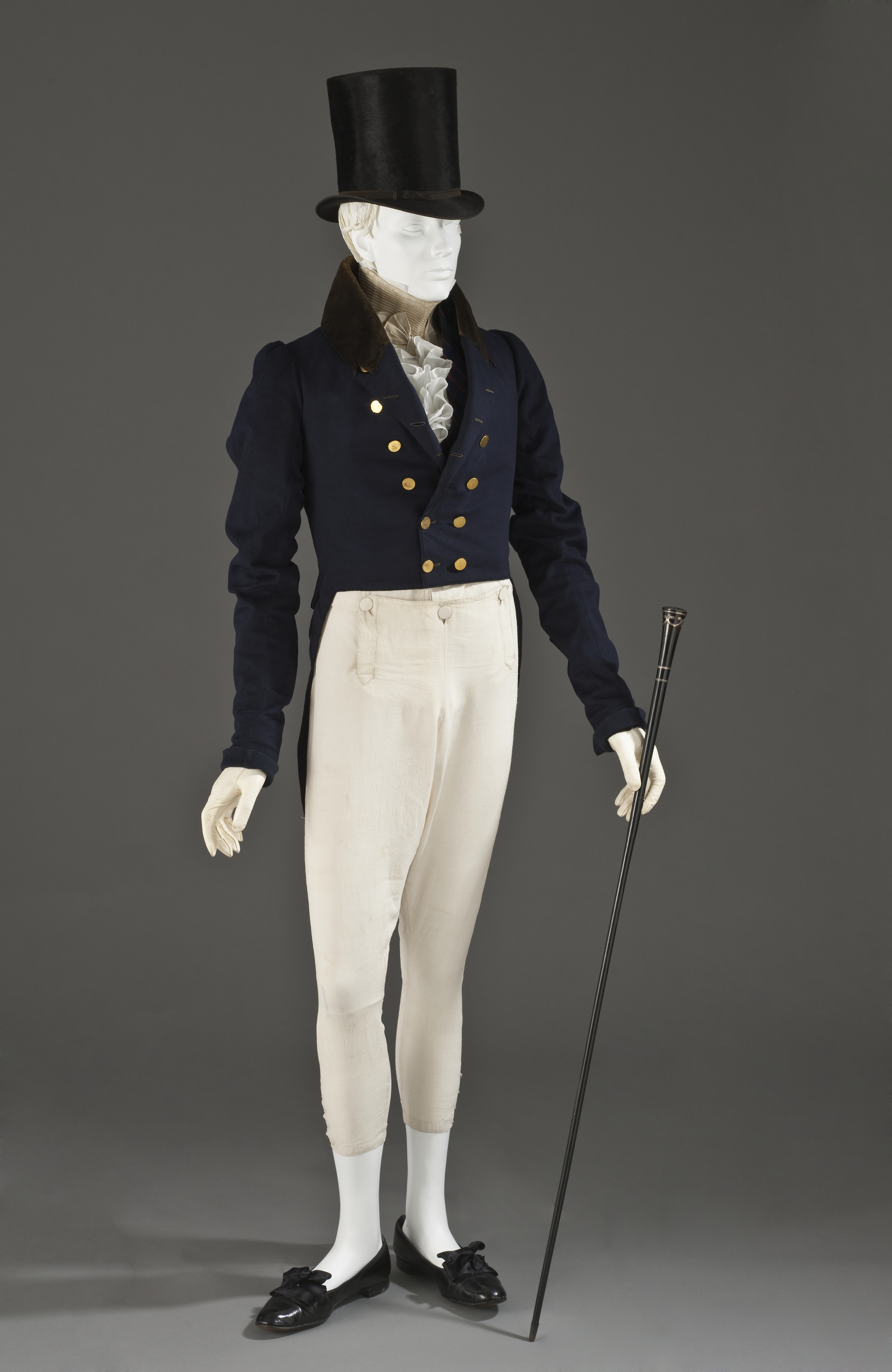
Man's tailcoat, 1825–1830

== Historical overview and fashions ==
=== Early 1800s (1800–1829) ===
==== Technological innovations ====
At the turn of the 18th century, the Western world – namely Europe and the United States – were revelling in the prosperity of the rapid progress that came with the rise of the Industrial Revolution. The period from approximately 1760 to between 1820 and 1840 saw the transition to new manufacturing processes from traditional hand production methods to new machine production methods.

The textile industry was the first to use modern production techniques, namely mechanised cotton spinning with automatic machine looms. With the arrival of automated methods, through industrialisation came too the creation of factories which maximised productivity and enhanced efficient production. The unprecedented rapid and sustained economic growth demonstrated by the textile industry – through employment and value output – saw huge changes in the affordability of clothes and materials as prices fell.

==== Art, culture, and politics ====
The early 19th century saw a shift from 18th century Enlightenment ideologies of order, reason and rationalism to new values of imagination and emotion with the emergence of Romanticism. The period of Romanticism from around 1800–1840 emphasised an opposition to stability, celebrating an appreciation of the chaotic which admires creativity, individuality, subjectivity, spontaneity, the sensory and the transcendental.

In England, this period is also known as the Georgian [or Regency] Era which saw great change with rapid urbanisation as cities grew, trade expanded, and a capitalist-driven consumer culture emerged.

The fashion of the time reflects this transitional period as it gradually moves away from the Empire silhouette and Neoclassical influences of Enlightenment which take inspiration from 'classical antiquity'. The shift towards a new Romantic style inspired by creativity and imagination, is defined by more theatrical and dramatic designs which are inspired by a blend of the mysterious medieval past with lavish and dramatic Gothic decoration. The extravagance of these displays reaches its peak nearing the end of Romanticism as 'exuberance becomes sentimentality'. For both men and women, silhouettes were increasingly exaggerated with the establishment of curvaceous shapes pointing to an obvious rejection of previous Neoclassical geometric style. Layers of colour and pattern added to the dramatic and expressive display which became characteristic of Romanticism and again contrasted the 18th century monochromatic palette.

=== Mid-1800s (1830–1869) ===
==== Technological innovations ====
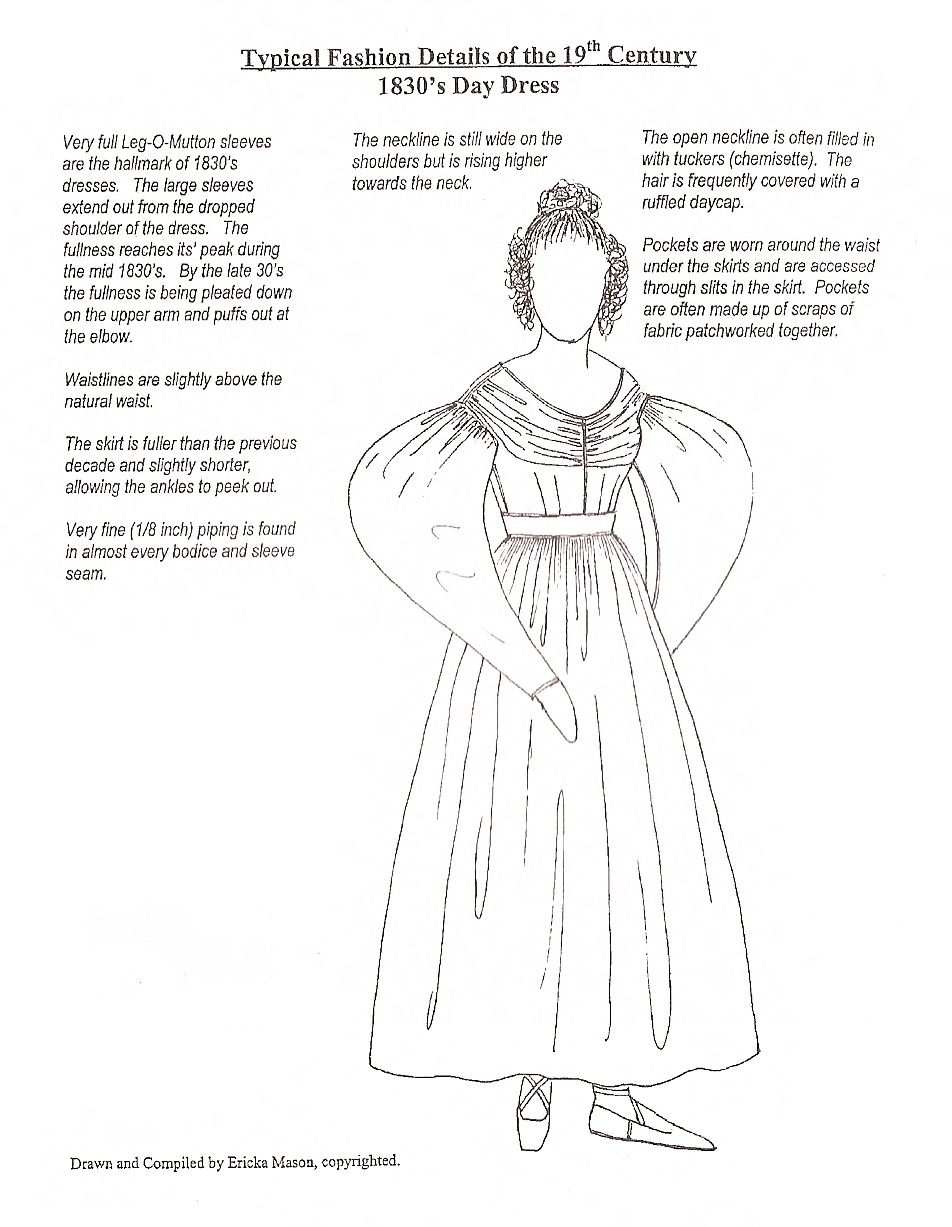
1830 silhouette

By mid-nineteenth century people were settling into the normal routine of life as shaped by the changes and innovations that came with the First Industrial Revolution. Further discoveries in mathematics, science and engineering saw advancements in medicine as well as huge progress for communication and transportation. The introduction of telegraphy and the opening of major railways connected people in major industrial cities to one another. Emerging globalisation and world-wide economic integration saw new trade routes and brought wealth to the capitalist powers of the Western world. As standards of living slowly improved and income per capita was on the rise, the middle-class were beginning to spend more on indulgent rather than solely necessary goods.

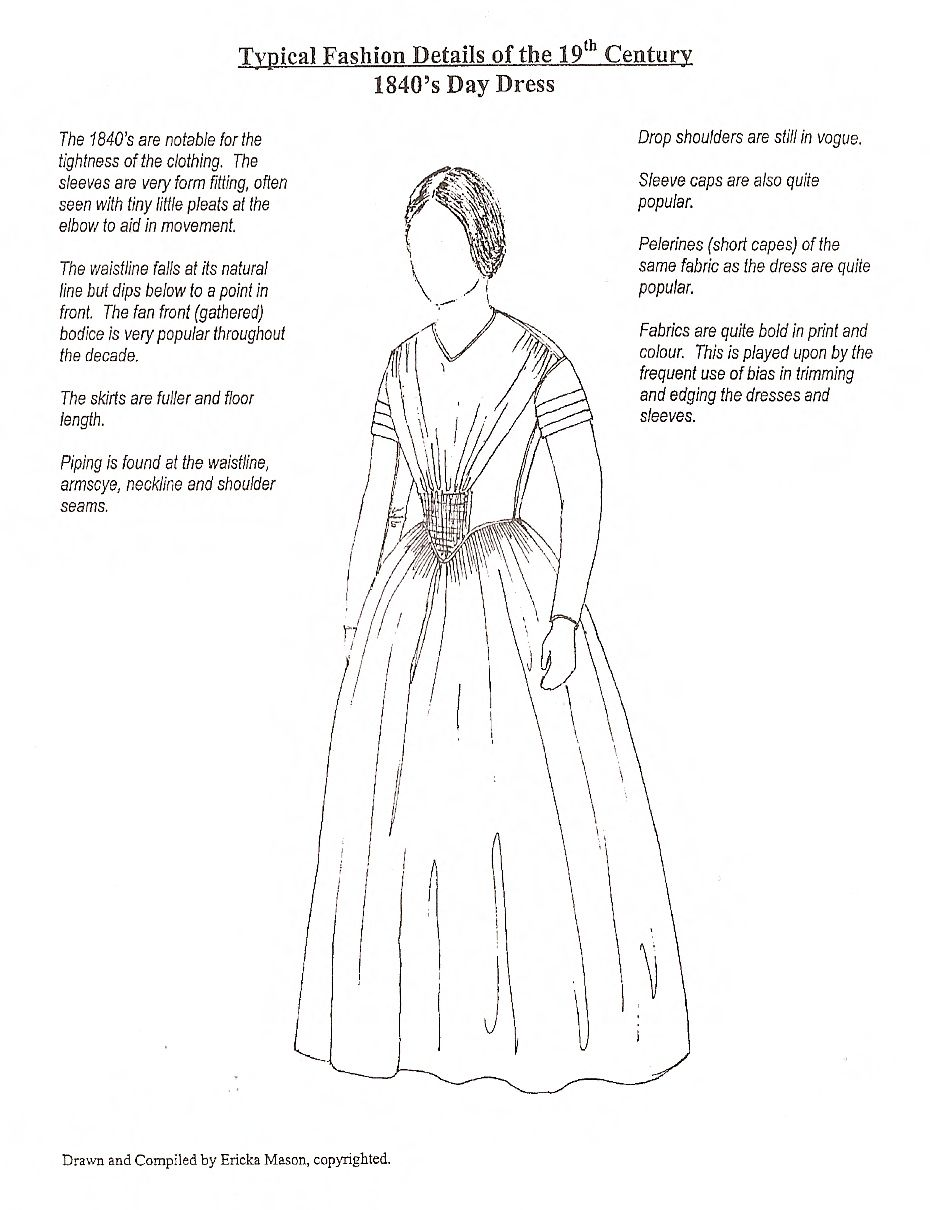
1840 silhouette

The modernisation of communication and transportation technologies saw a shift in the traditional consumption patterns of retail consumers. The invention of mail order business by Pryce Pryce-Jones in 1861 revolutionised shopping patterns and enabled people to order clothing and accessories [via telegram] from other parts of the world [to then be delivered via train] a much similar concept to contemporary online shopping habits.

==== Art, culture and politics ====
The mid-19th century again shifts from Romanticism to Realism, sometimes called Naturalism. This ideological art movement "sought to convey a truthful and objective vision of contemporary life".

1837 marked the beginning of the Victorian era, a time that saw tremendous progress, change and power for the British Empire and one that characterises an entire genre of fashion history.

Women's fashion at the beginning of Queen Victoria's reign became more modest – corsets were paired with swelled skirts which aligned with early Victorian ideals of the modest domestic lady stereotype. Layered petticoats with crinoline and steel-hoop structures. Menswear of the early Victorian Era was understated with the rise of the respectable male bourgeois gentleman. However, soon after both men's and women's fashion became more colourful and relaxed with more exuberant styles and new techniques including passementerie trims thanks to increasing availability of the sewing machine. By the latter half of mid-nineteenth century it becomes clear that fashion technologies revolutionised the designs of particularly womenswear fashion with cage crinoline enabling a larger but more lightweight hoop skirt. In align with the trend of offering greater comfort, menswear "relaxed into wide, easy cuts".

=== Late 1800s (1870–1899) ===
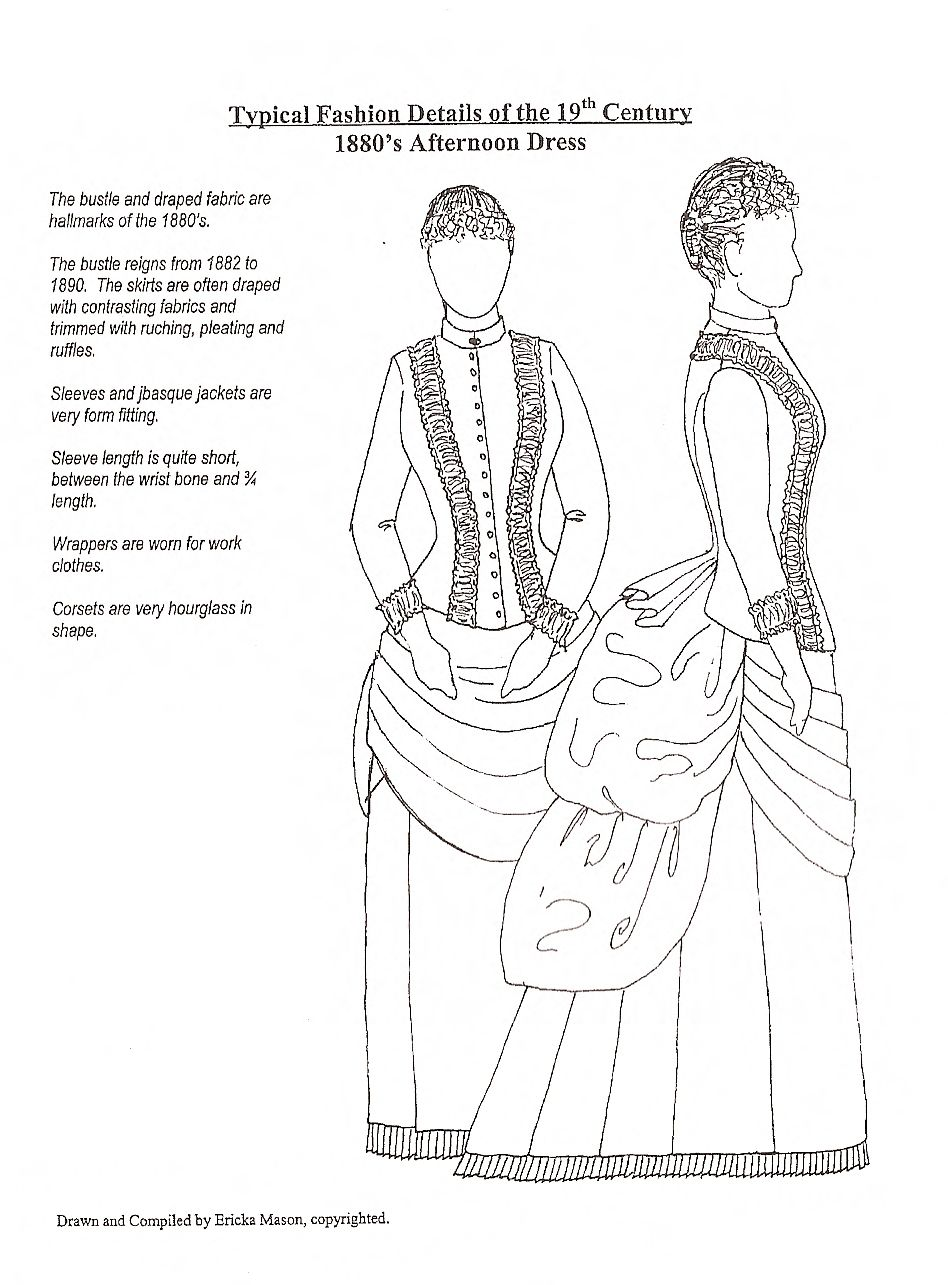
1880 silhouette

==== Technological innovations ====
The late-19th century constituted further industrialization with the Second Industrial Revolution, also known as the Technological revolution, which was responsible for illustrious innovations. The modern social and economic infrastructure continued to revolutionise consumption patterns as the prices of consumer goods decreased dramatically with the increase in productivity. The growth of urban centres and "new technologies, such as the introduction of electricity into clothing manufacturing, produced a boom in the ready-to-wear market".

Progress in communications and the media meant that fashionable styles and silhouettes were widespread globally and accessible to the everyday person. With the rise of publications, magazines aimed especially at women depicted the styles in vogue at the time and began to introduce paper patterns. The popularity of these patterns paired with machine innovation and ease-of-use saw a rise in the popularity of at home dressmaking.

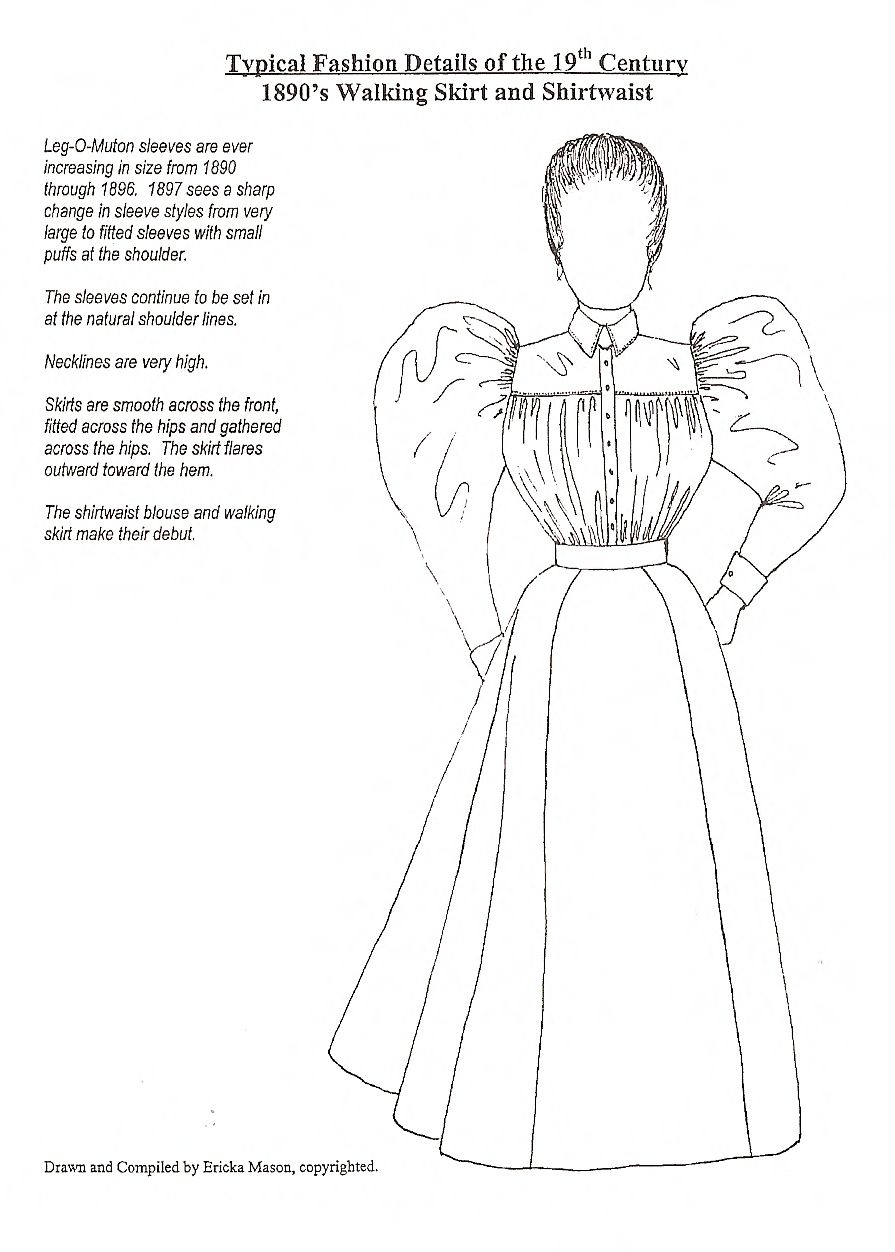
1890 silhouette

==== Art, culture and politics ====
Late 19th century movements in art and culture include Impressionism and Post-Impressionism which are characterised by their rebellion against classical subject matter and that which embraces depictions of modern life including new technology and ideas – "concentrating on themes of deeper symbolism to express emotions, rather than simply optical impressions".

The women's rights and suffragist movement towards the turn of the 20th century also saw a shift in gender roles. As the 19th century neared its end, the world began to transition away from stiff Victorian fashions with the rise of the Edwardian era to new freedoms of a more simplistic dress structure and silhouette.

Women's fashion of the late 19th century saw an introduction of styles with a long, slim, body-hugging silhouette that revealed the natural figure, including the popular 'princess line' and later 'artistic' style dresses. These styles featured seamless waists, streamlined skirts and a slow move away from corsetry, much more practical than the conventional attire. These 'slender and angular' styles, had excessive decoration which compensated for the rebellion against heavy, ultra-restrictive trends. Dress embellishments included bows, emphasised ruching, thick rich fabrics and trims. Menswear began to have a significant influence on women's clothing with masculine styles and tailoring becoming increasingly popular, women sometimes wore a shirt collar and tie, particularly when exercising. For men, lounge suits were becoming increasingly popular and were often quite slim, maintaining an overall narrow silhouette. A three-piece suit was a more casual attire regularly worn by businessmen, with jackets open or partially undone with a waistcoat underneath. Heavily starched collars on shirts were worn high and stiff-standing, with turned down wingtips.

== Women's fashion ==
=== Dress style by the decade ===
==== 1800s–1810 ====
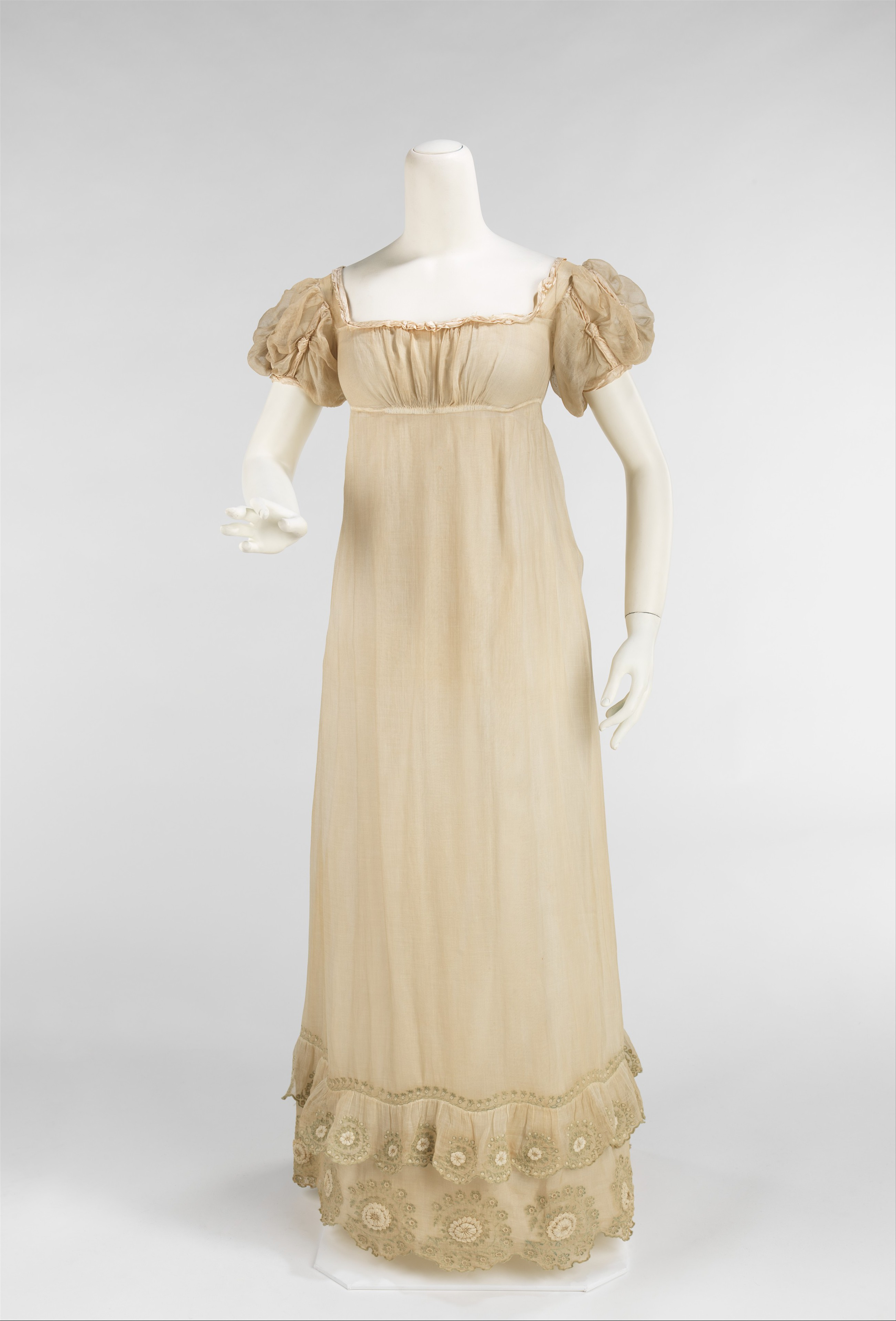
Empire silhouette c. 1810 (American)

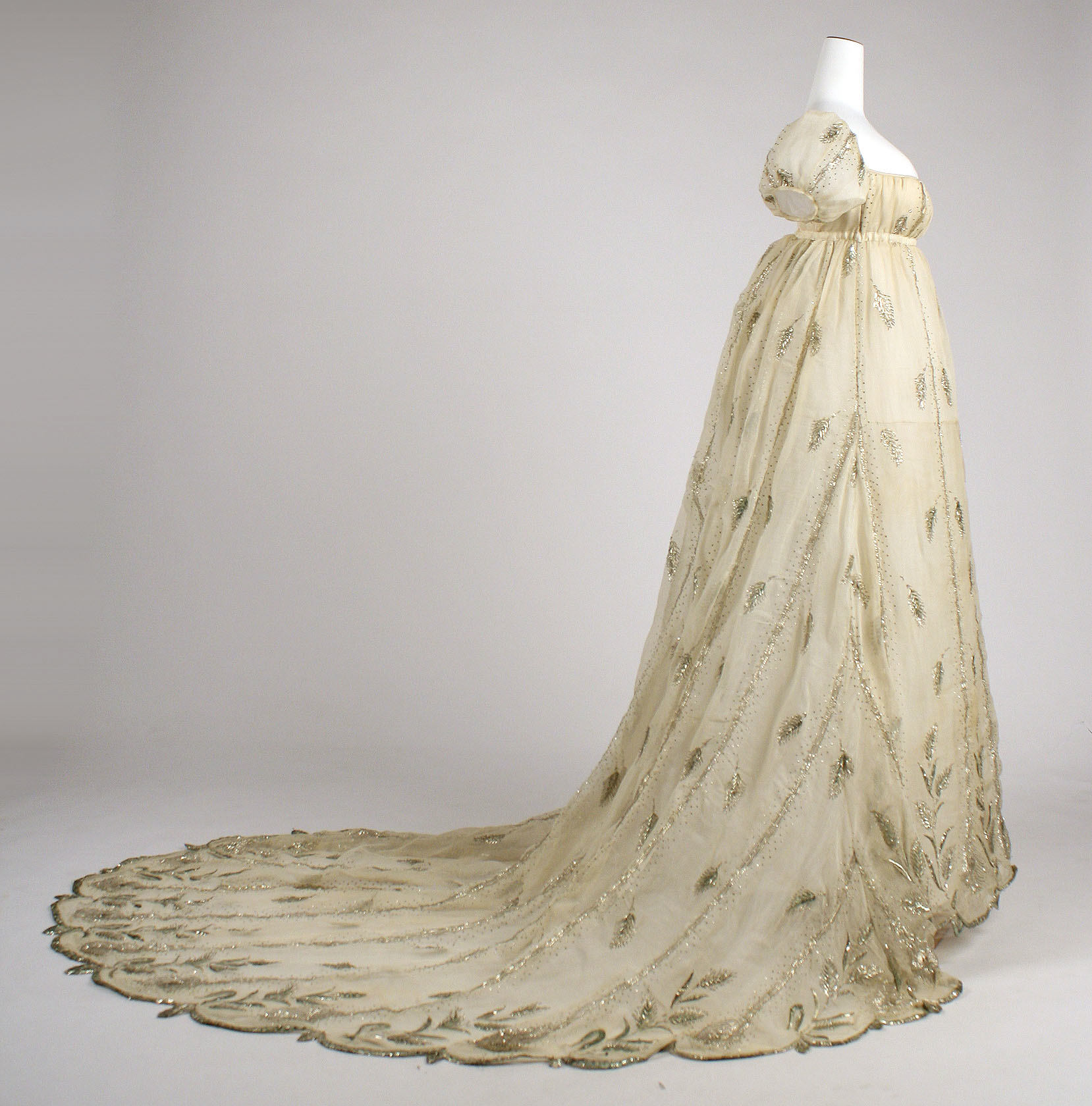
Evening dress 1805–1810 (French)

==== 1810s–1820 ====
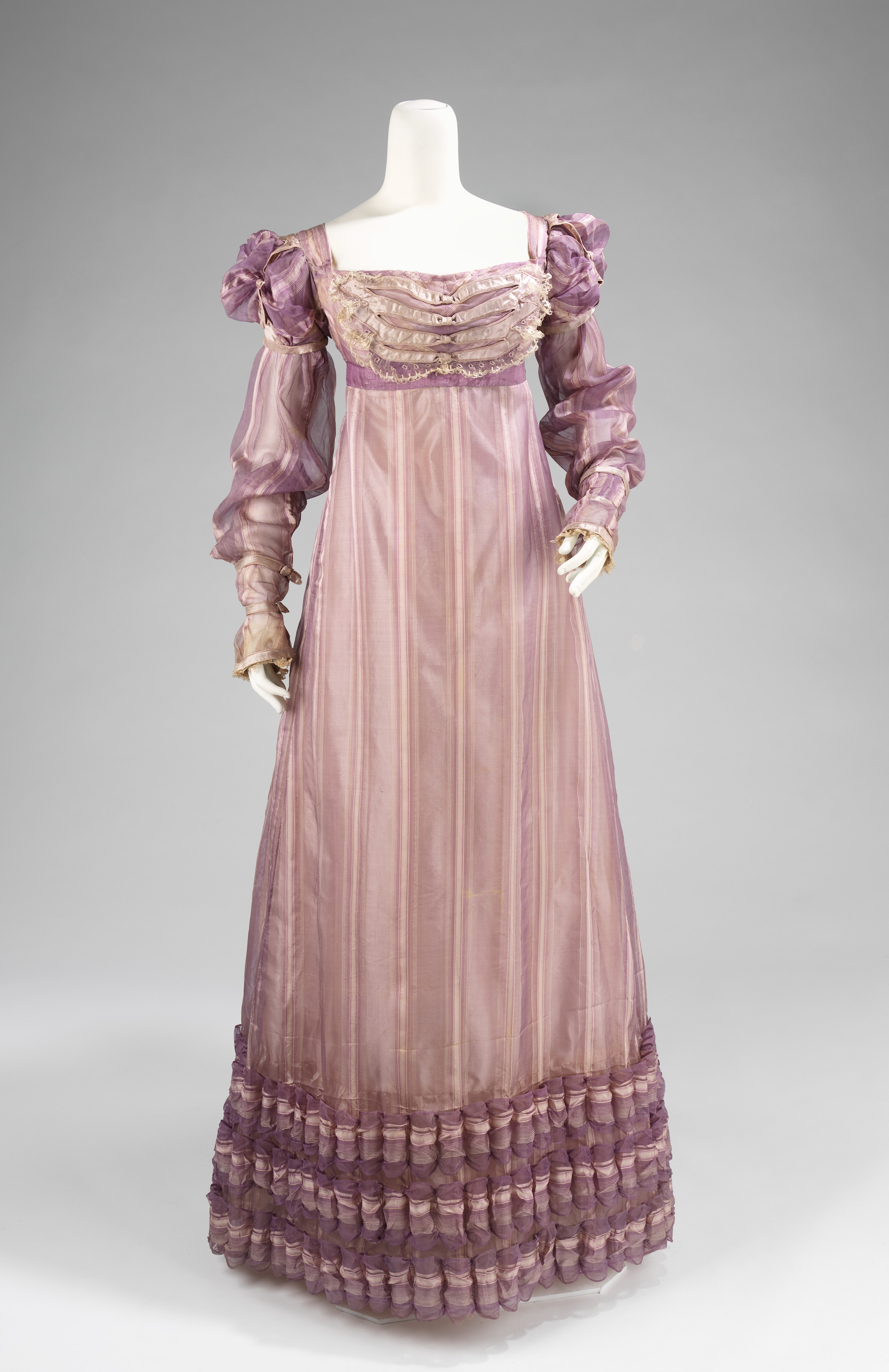
Ball gown c. 1820 (American)

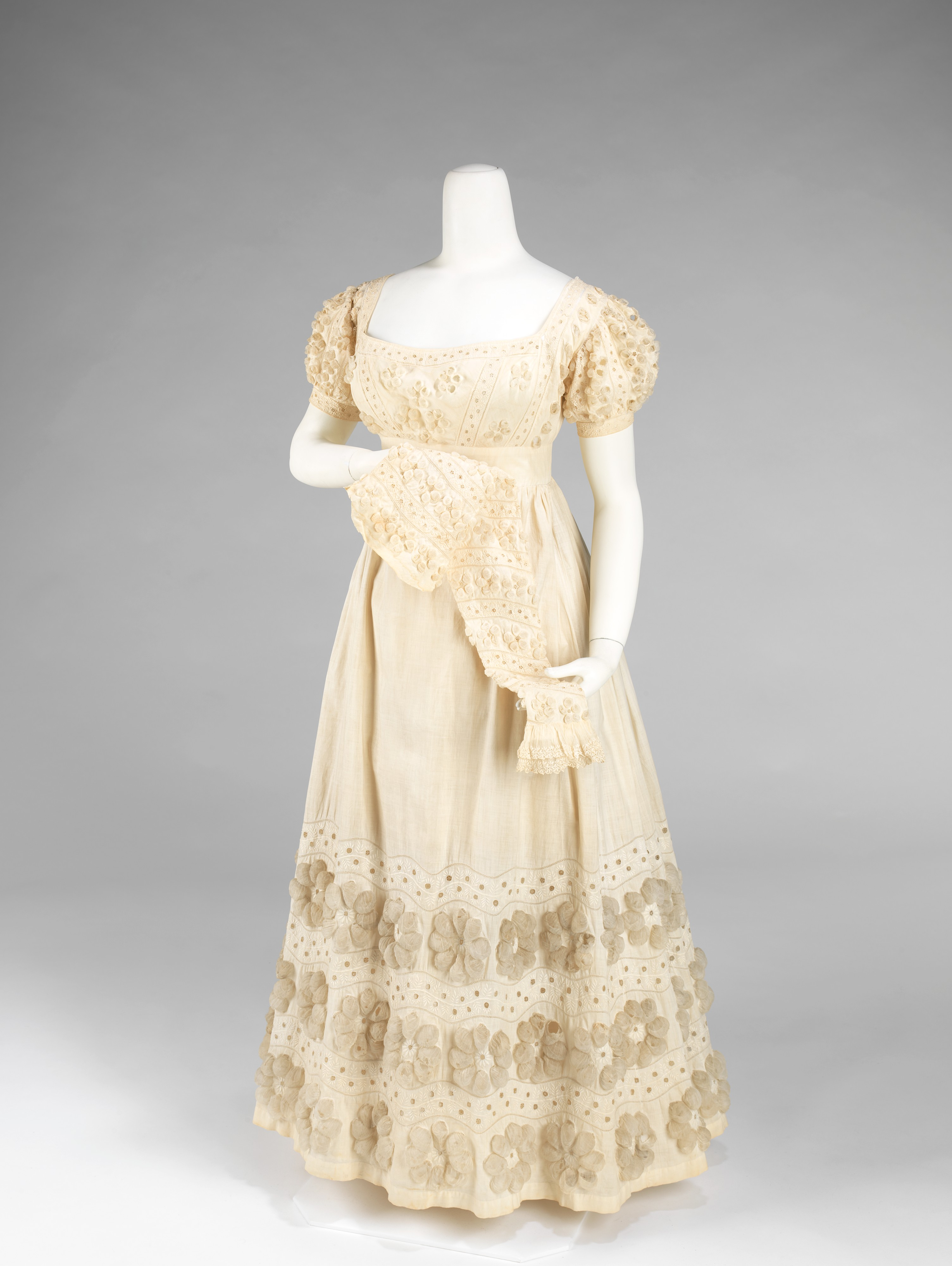
Evening dress c. 1820 (American)

==== 1820s–1830 ====
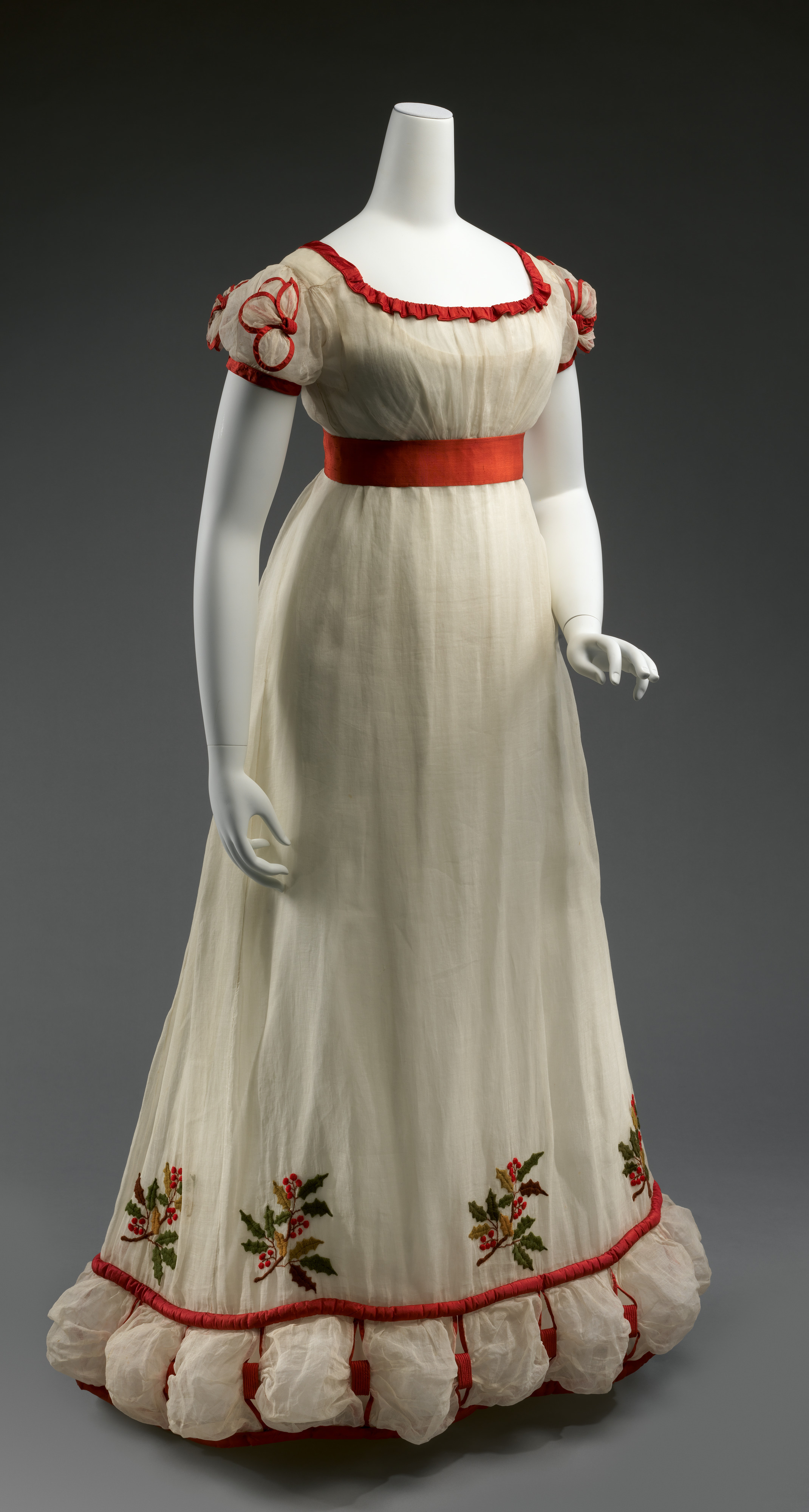
Dinner dress 1824–1826 (British)

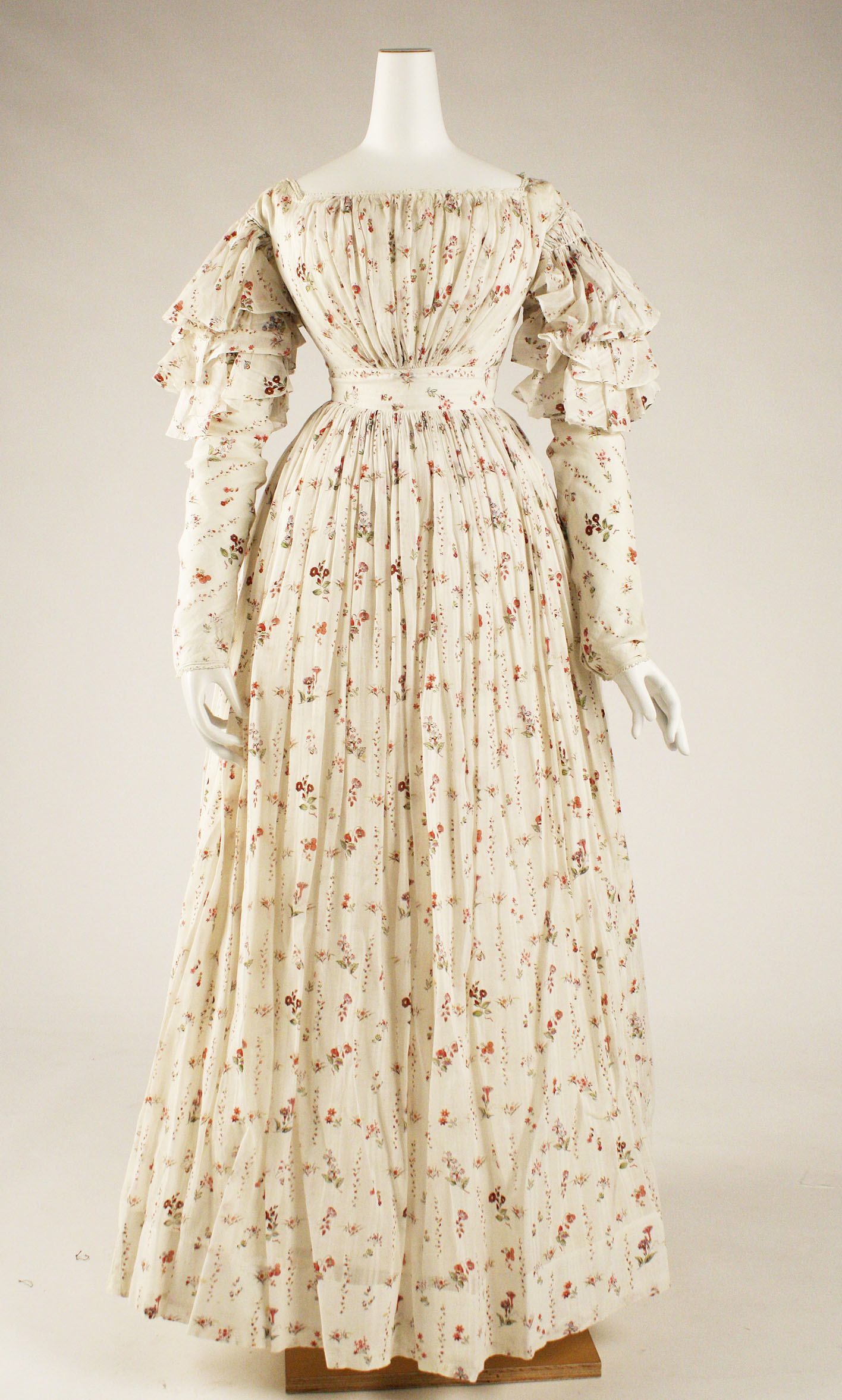
Dress late 1820s (British)

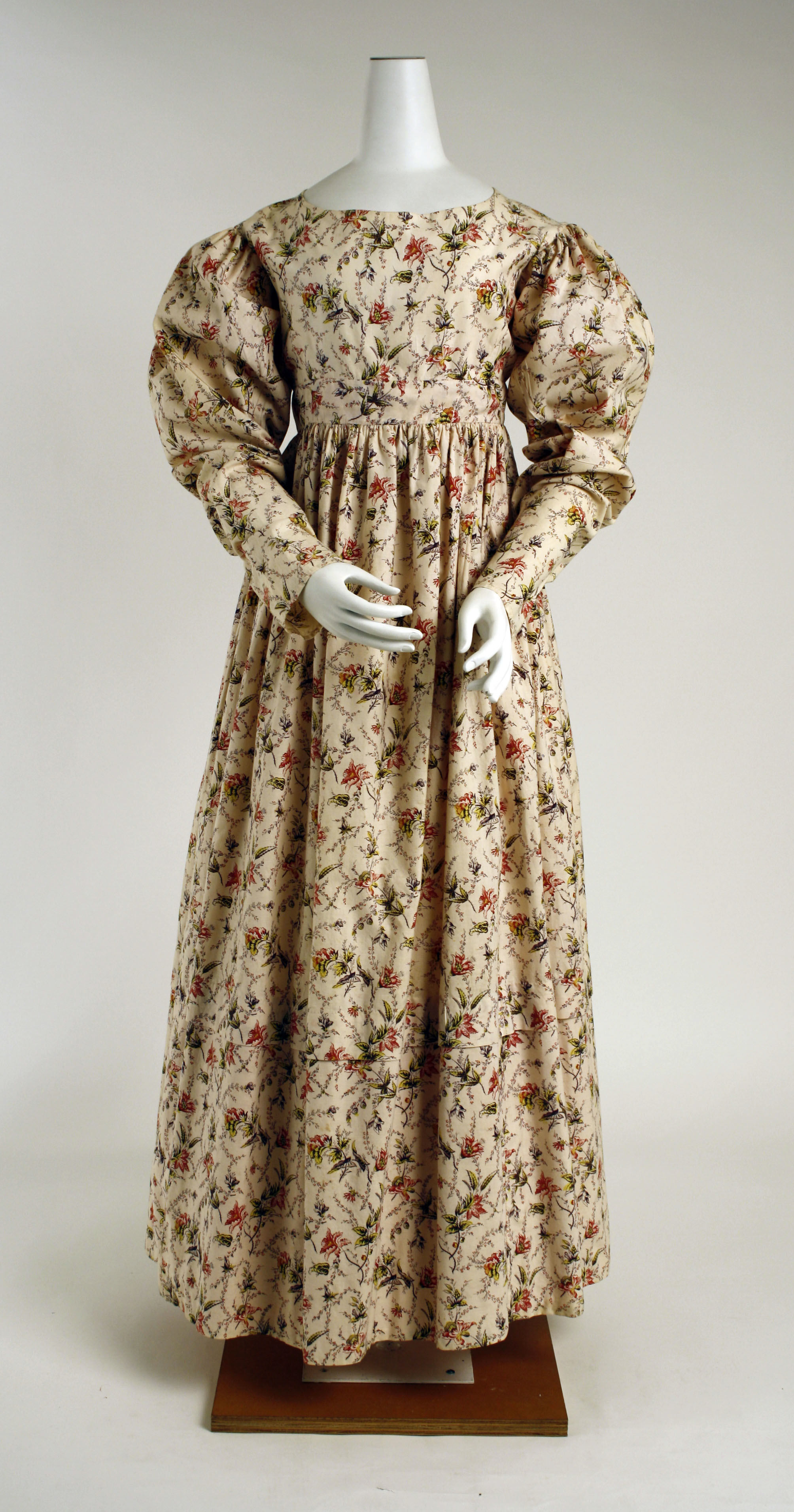
Morning dress mid-1820s (British)

==== 1830s–1840 ====
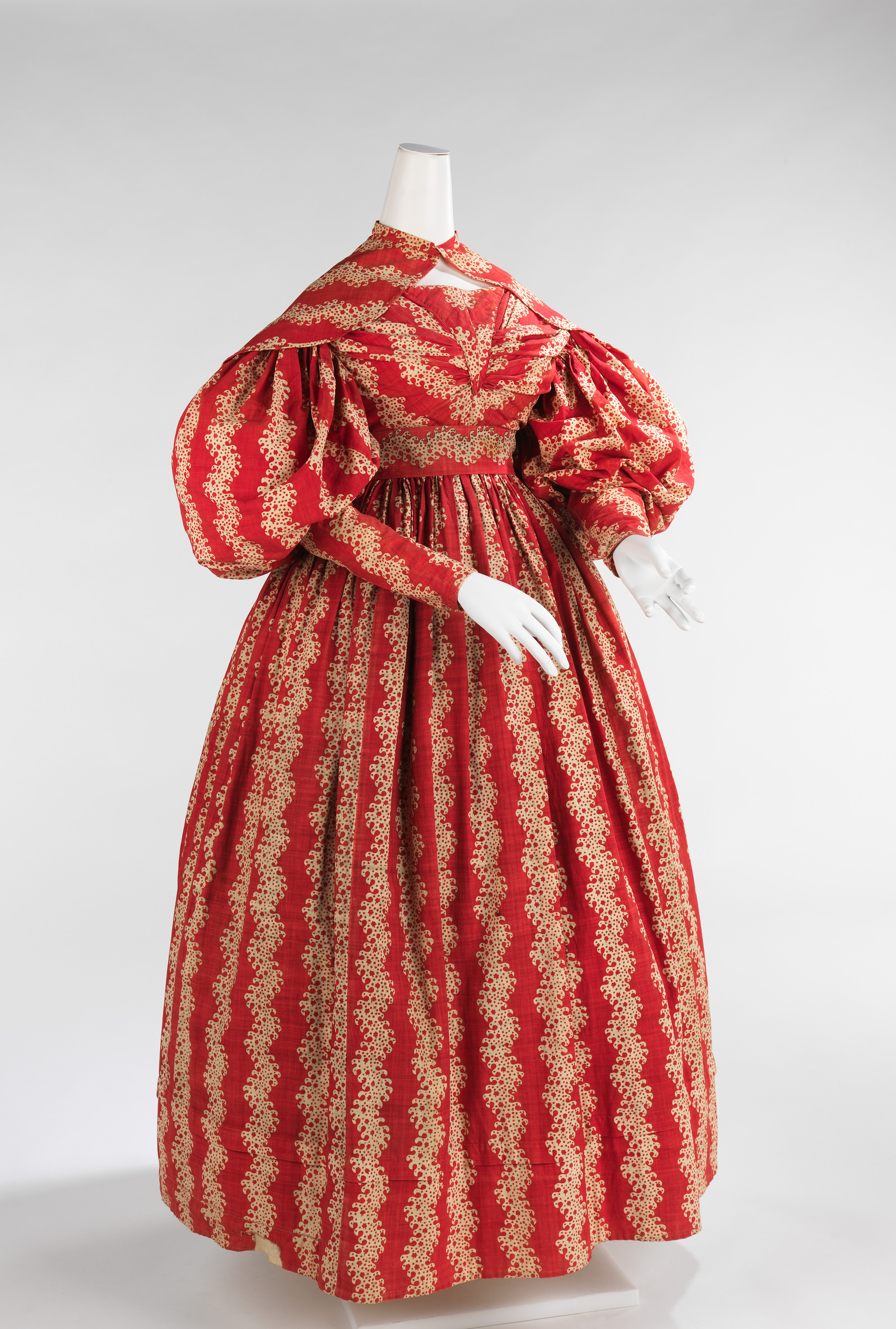
Dress 1832–1835 (American)

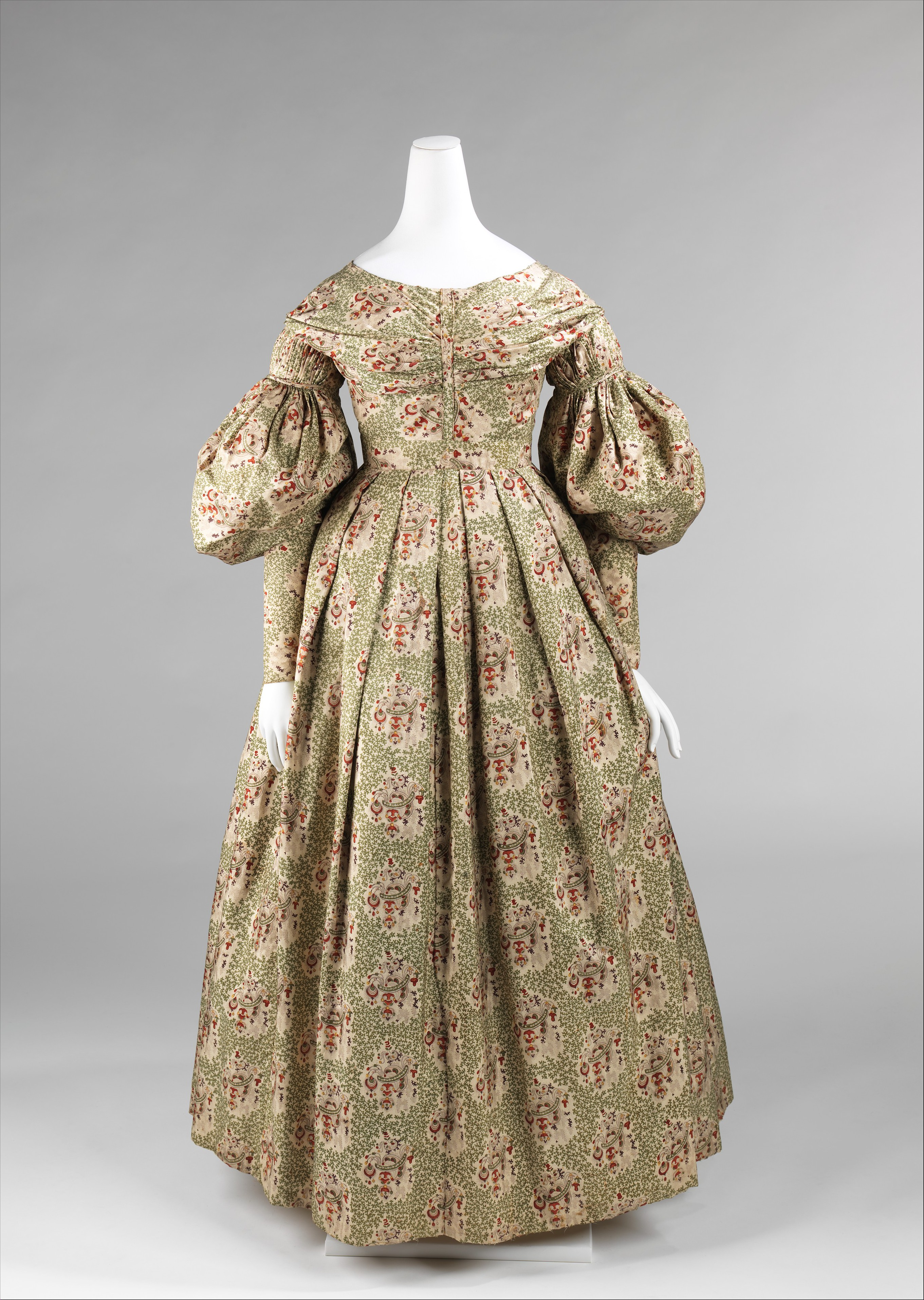
Morning dress 1837–1839 (American)

==== 1840s–1850 ====
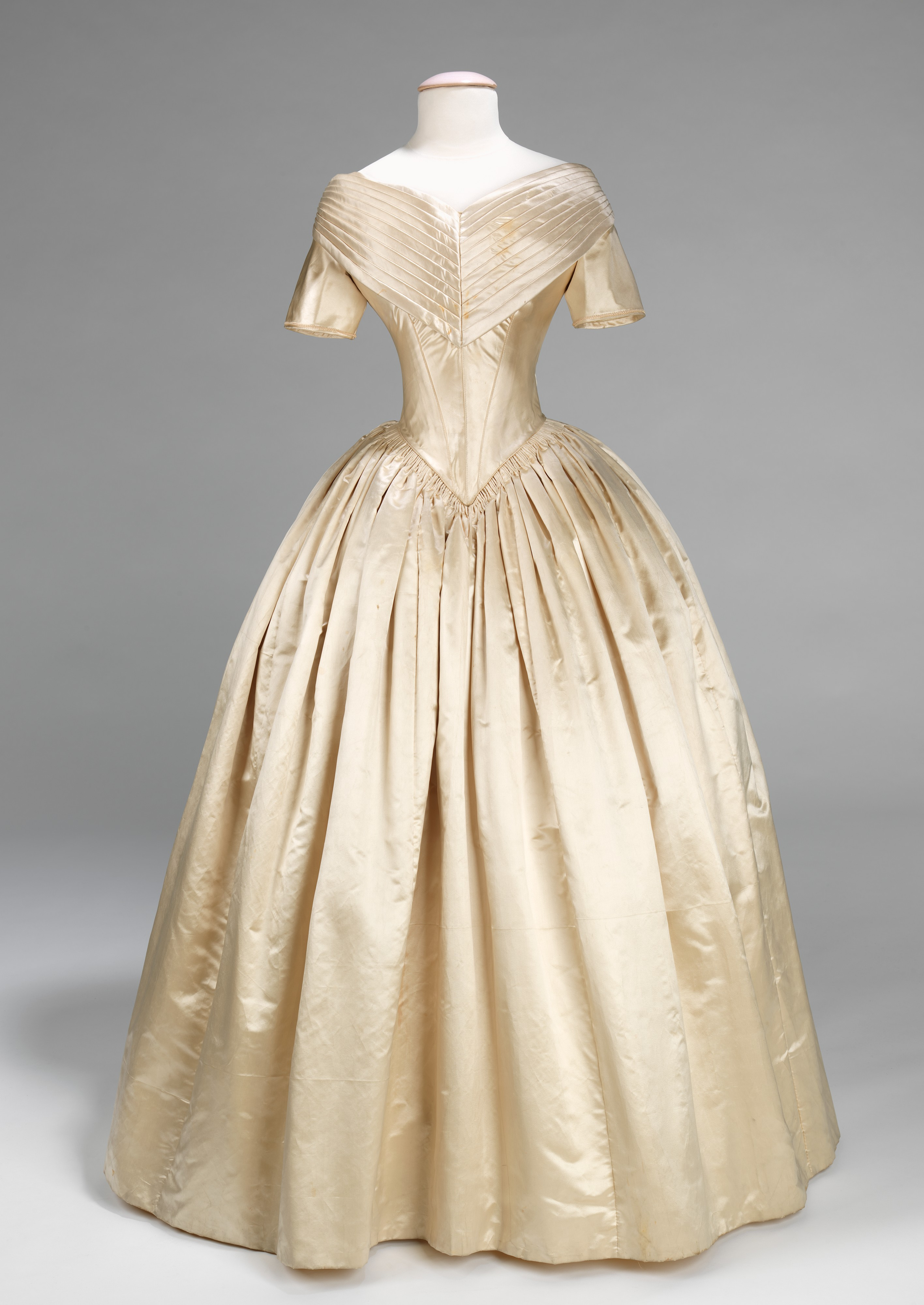
Evening dress 1840–1842 (American)

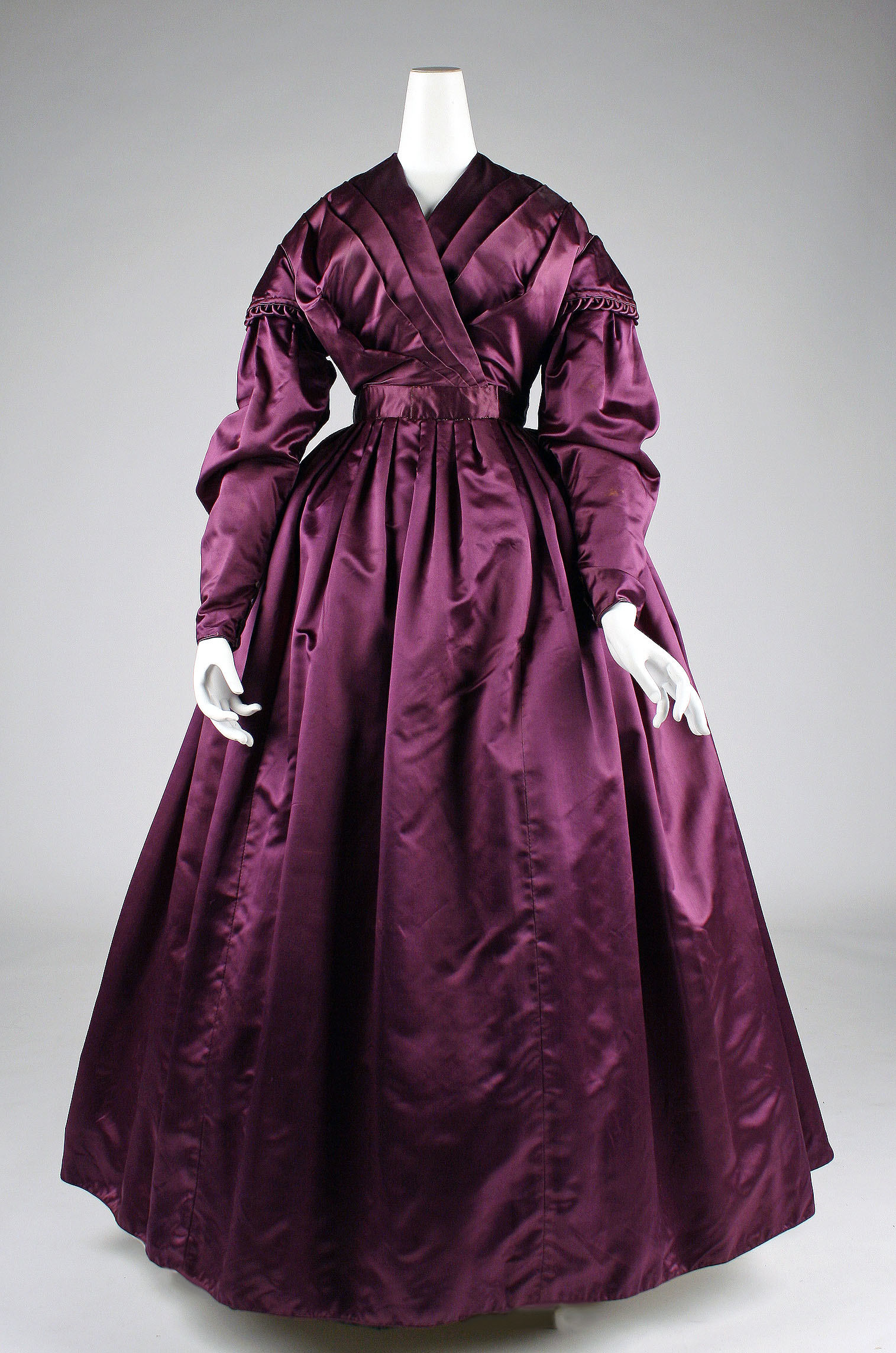
Dress c. 1840 (British)

==== 1850s–1860 ====
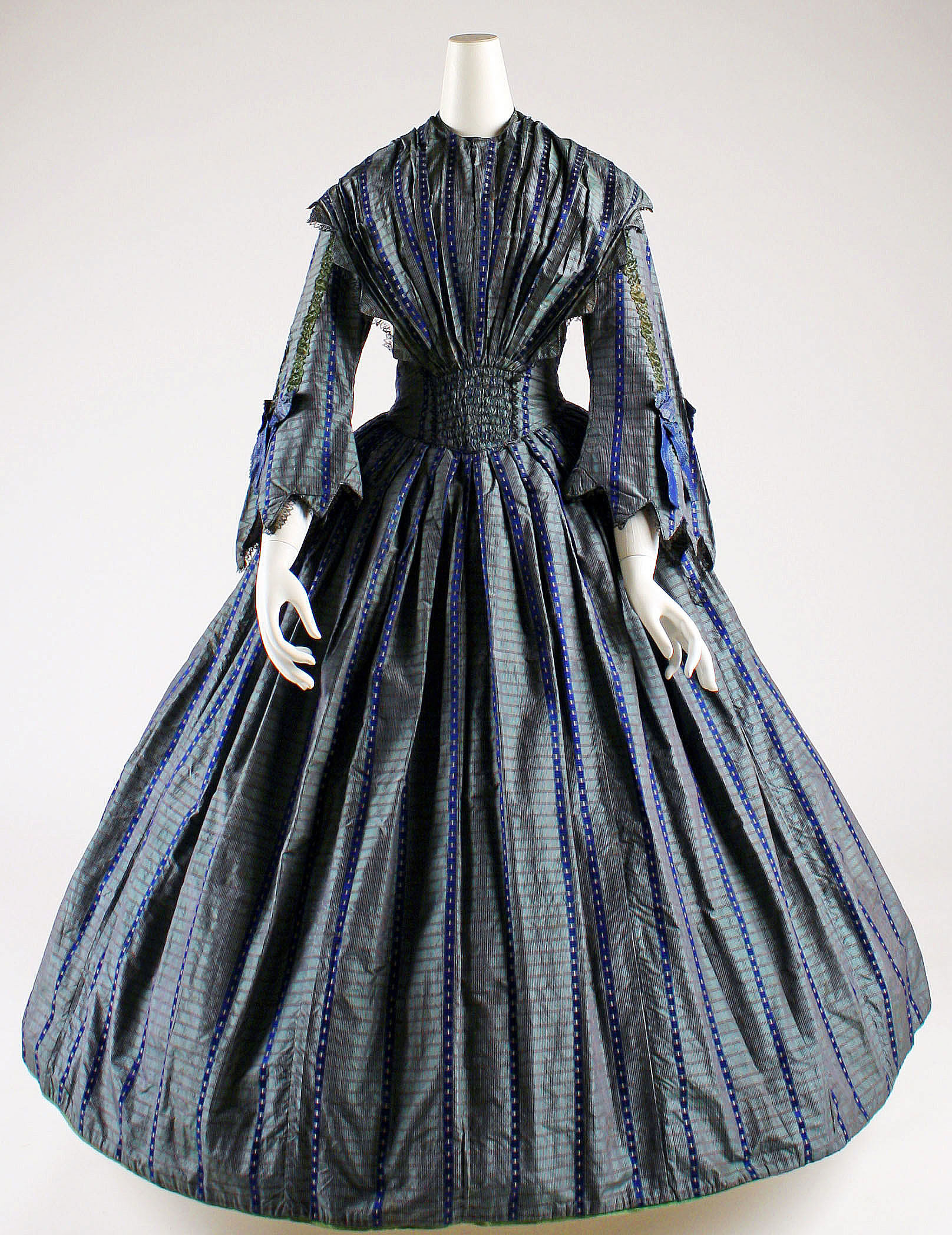
Dress c. 1850 (British)

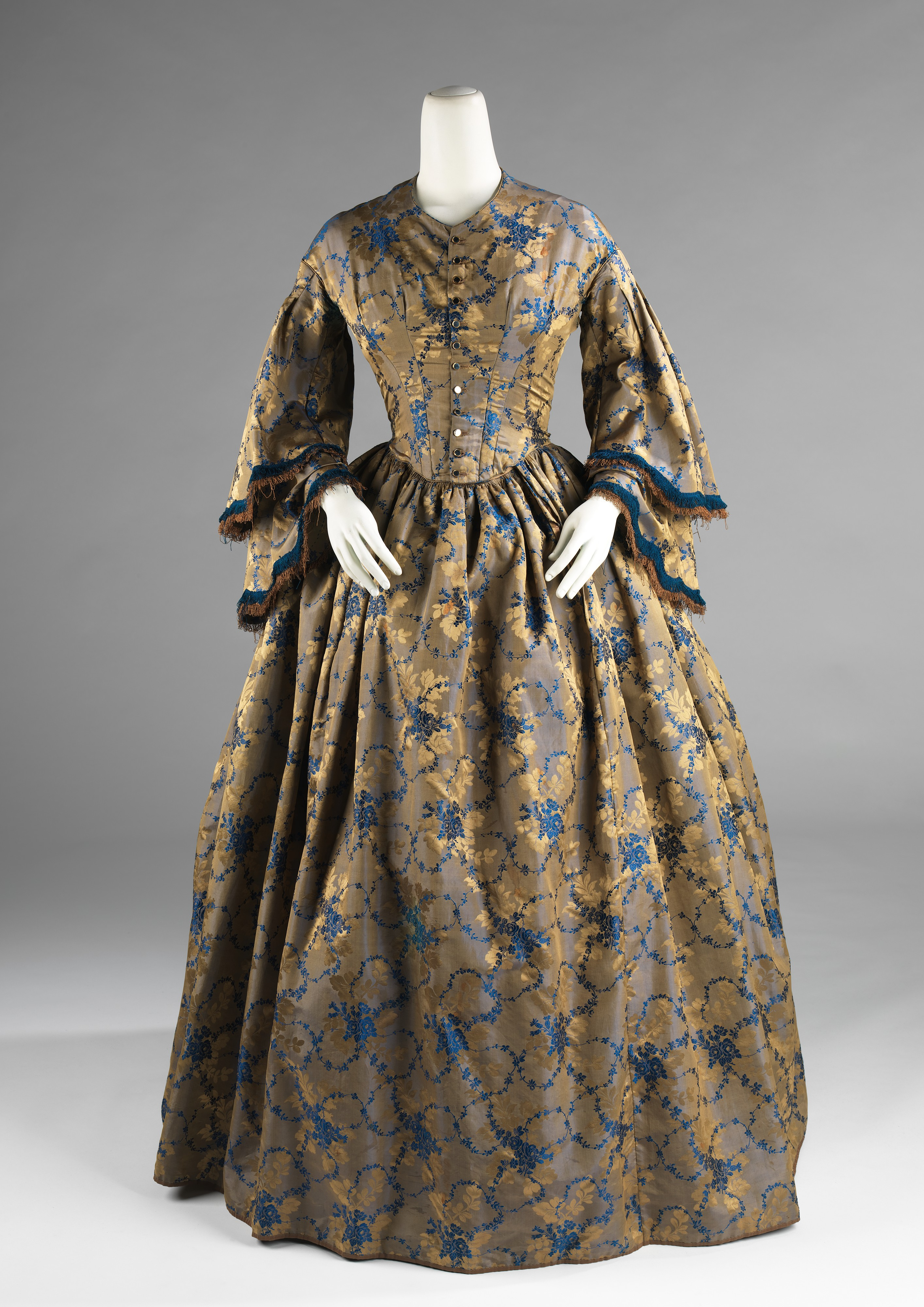
Afternoon dress 1850–1855 (American)

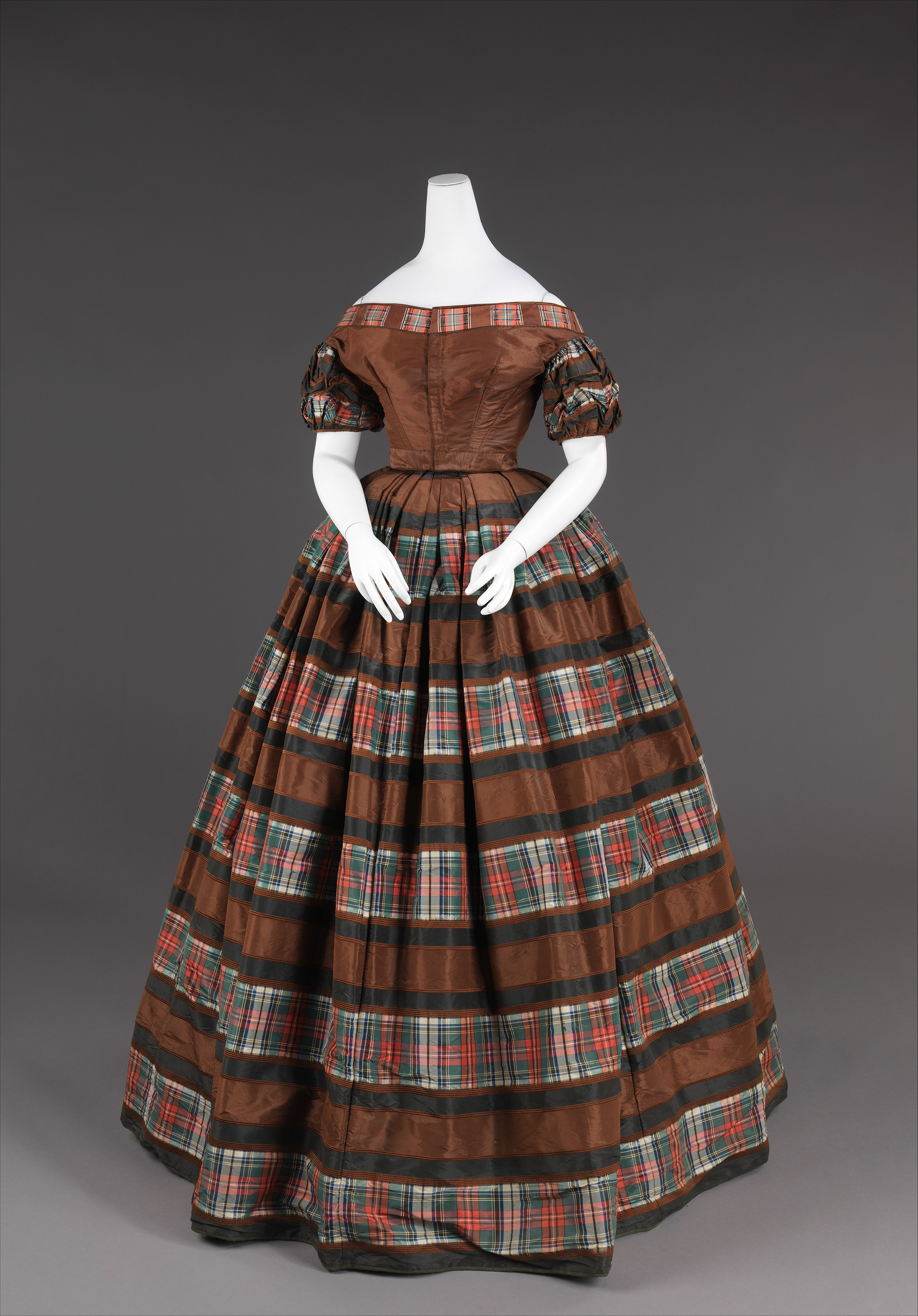
Evening dress 1850–1855 (American)

==== 1860s–1870 ====
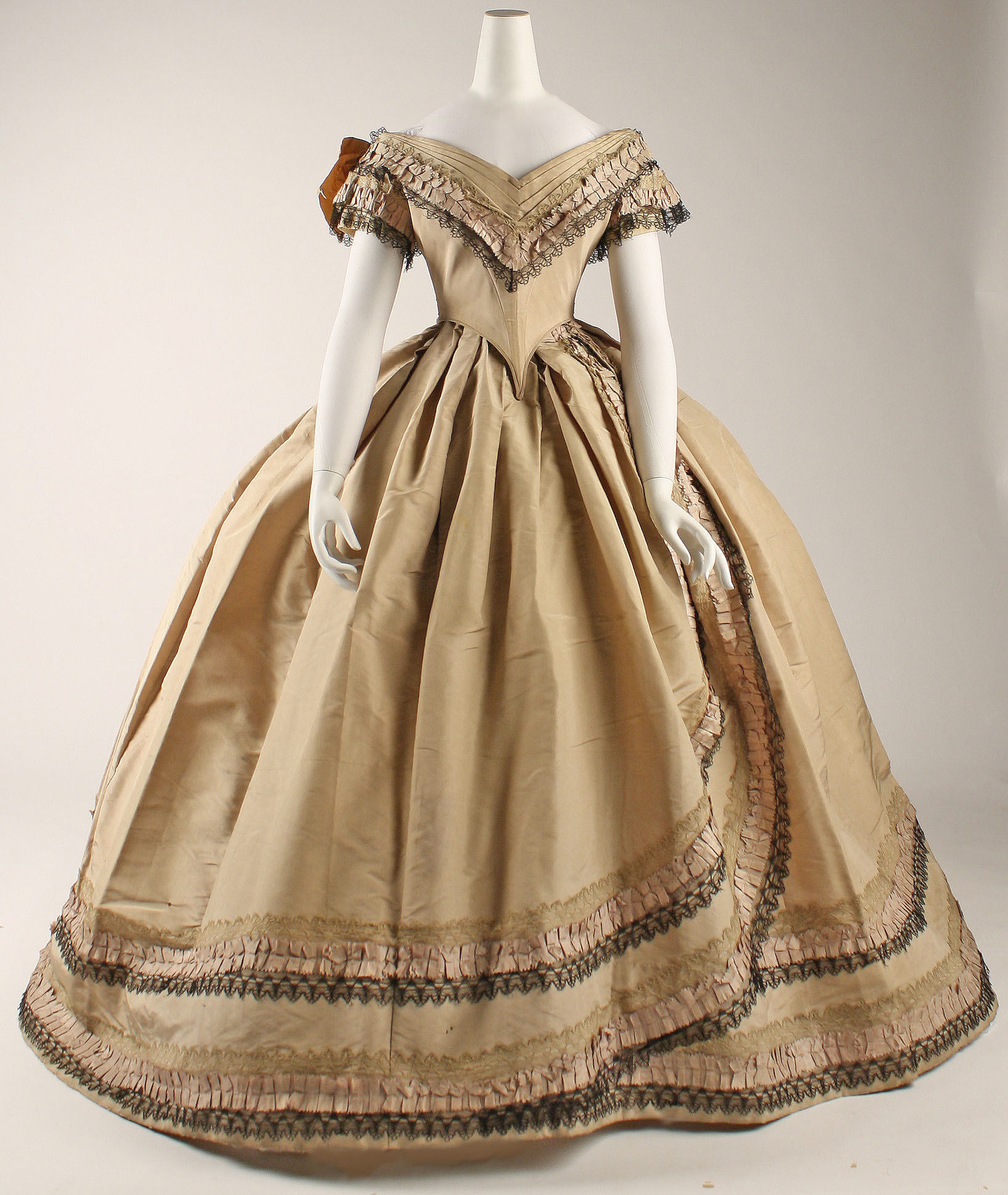
Dress 1860–1864 (British)

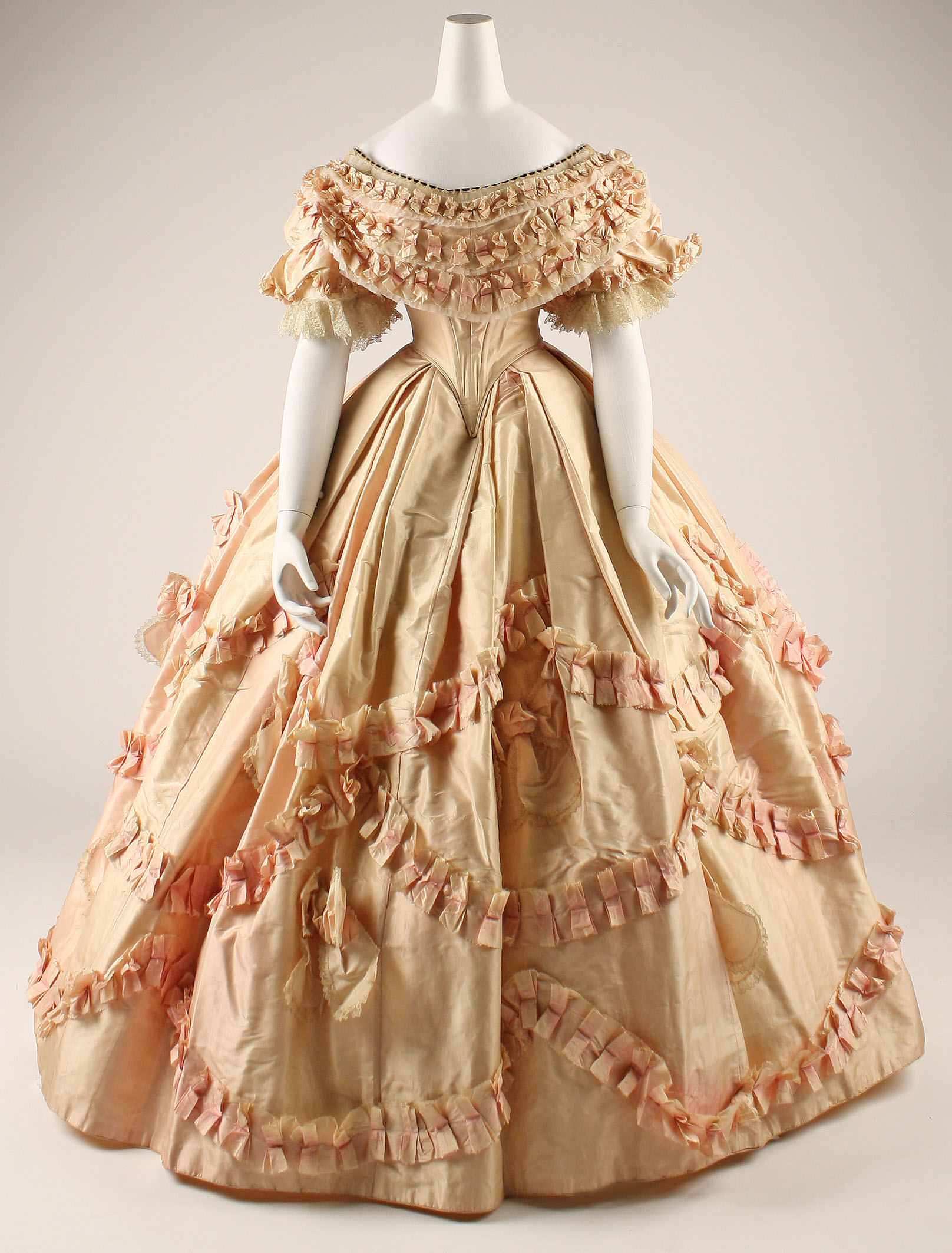
Dress 1860–1861 (French)

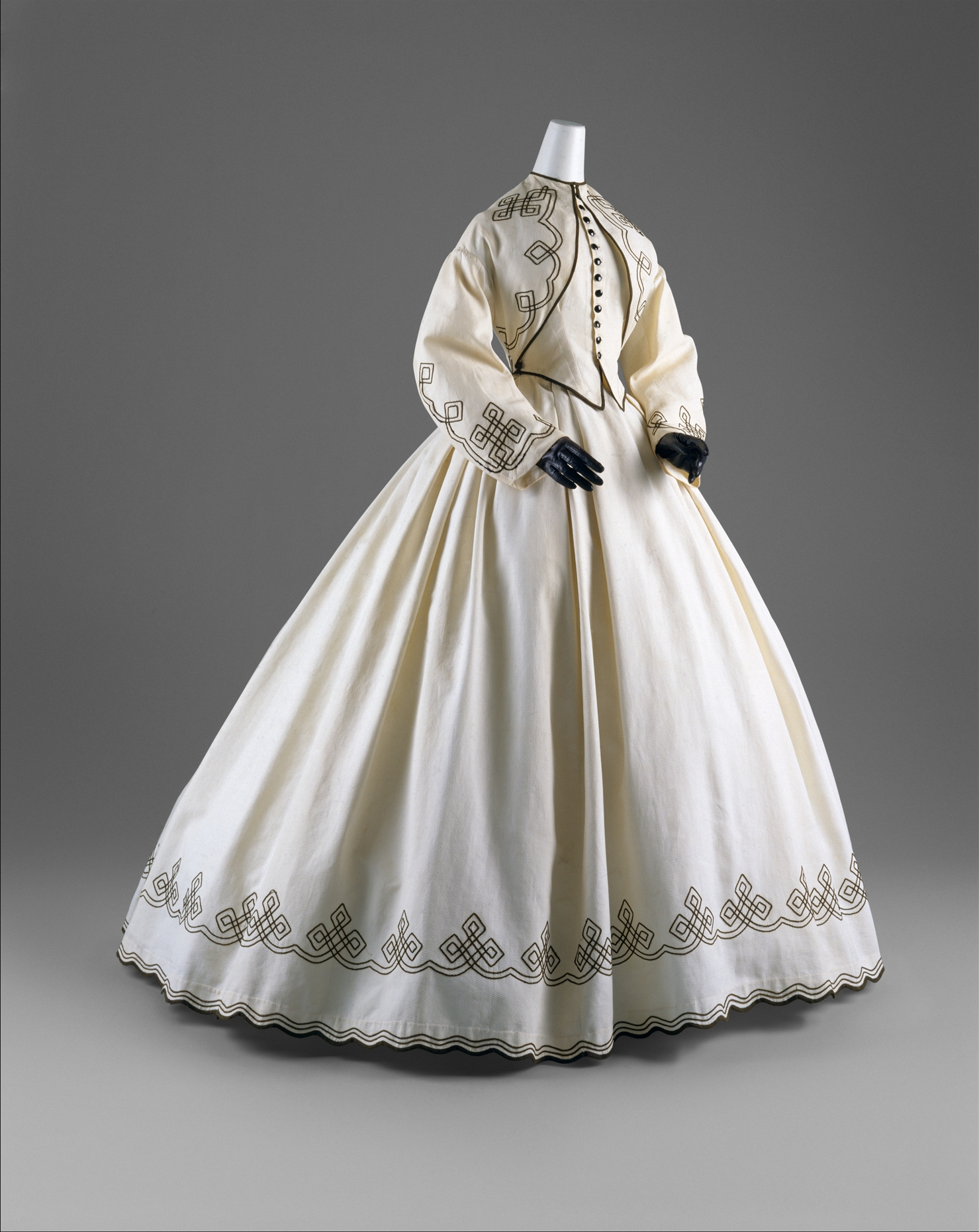
Promenade dress 1862–1864 (American)

==== 1870s–1880 ====
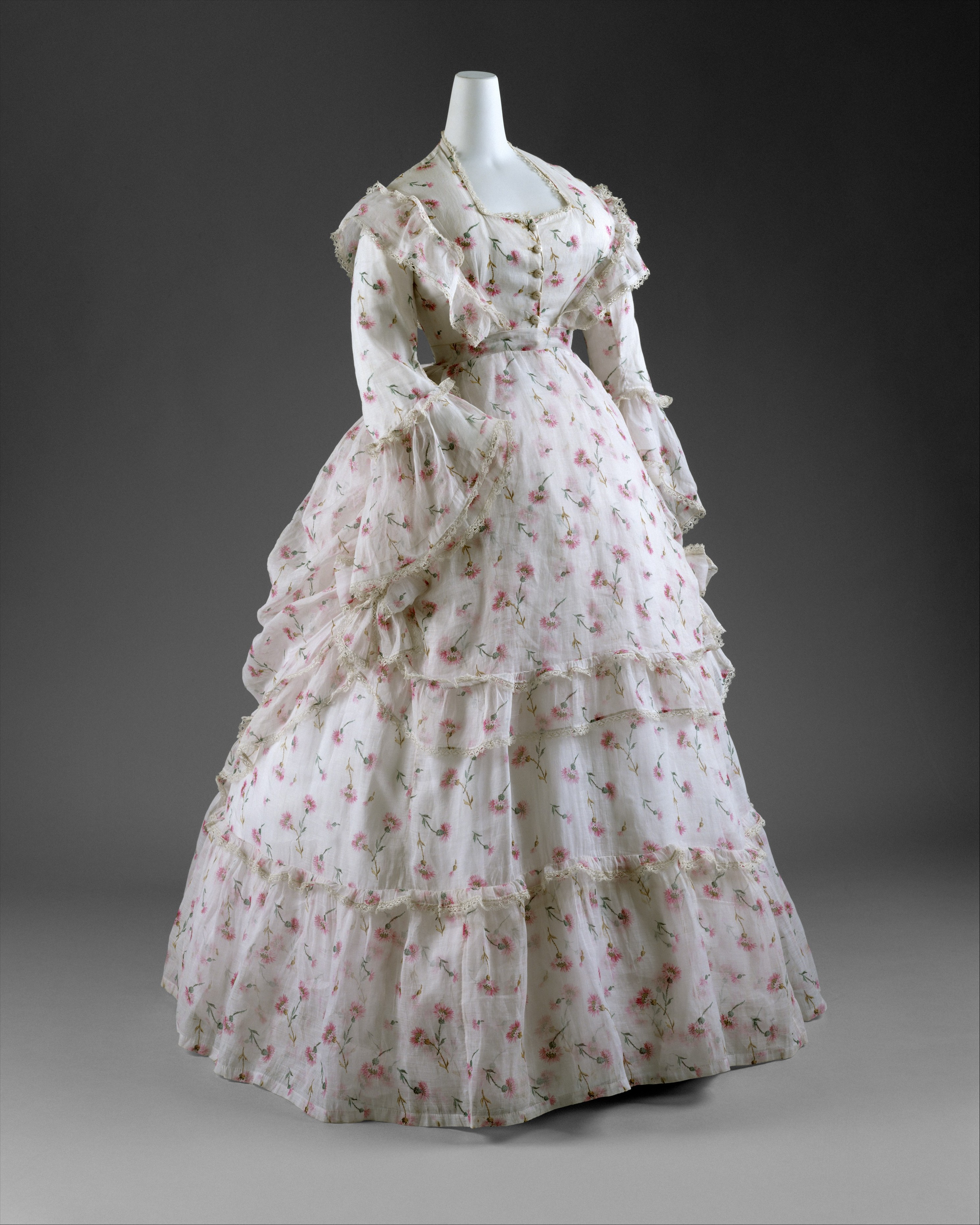
Romantic gown c. 1872 (French)

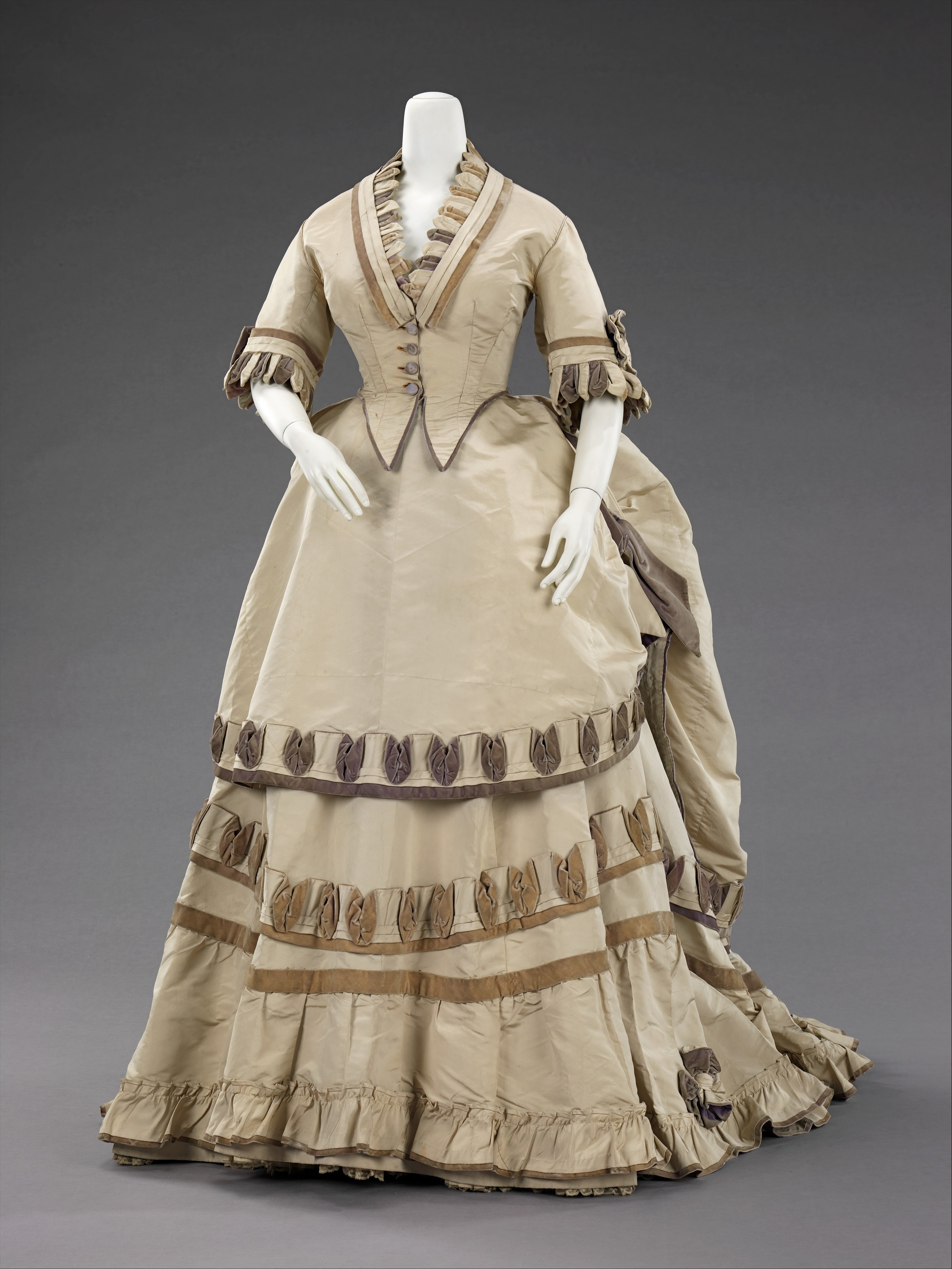
Dinner dress 1870 (American)

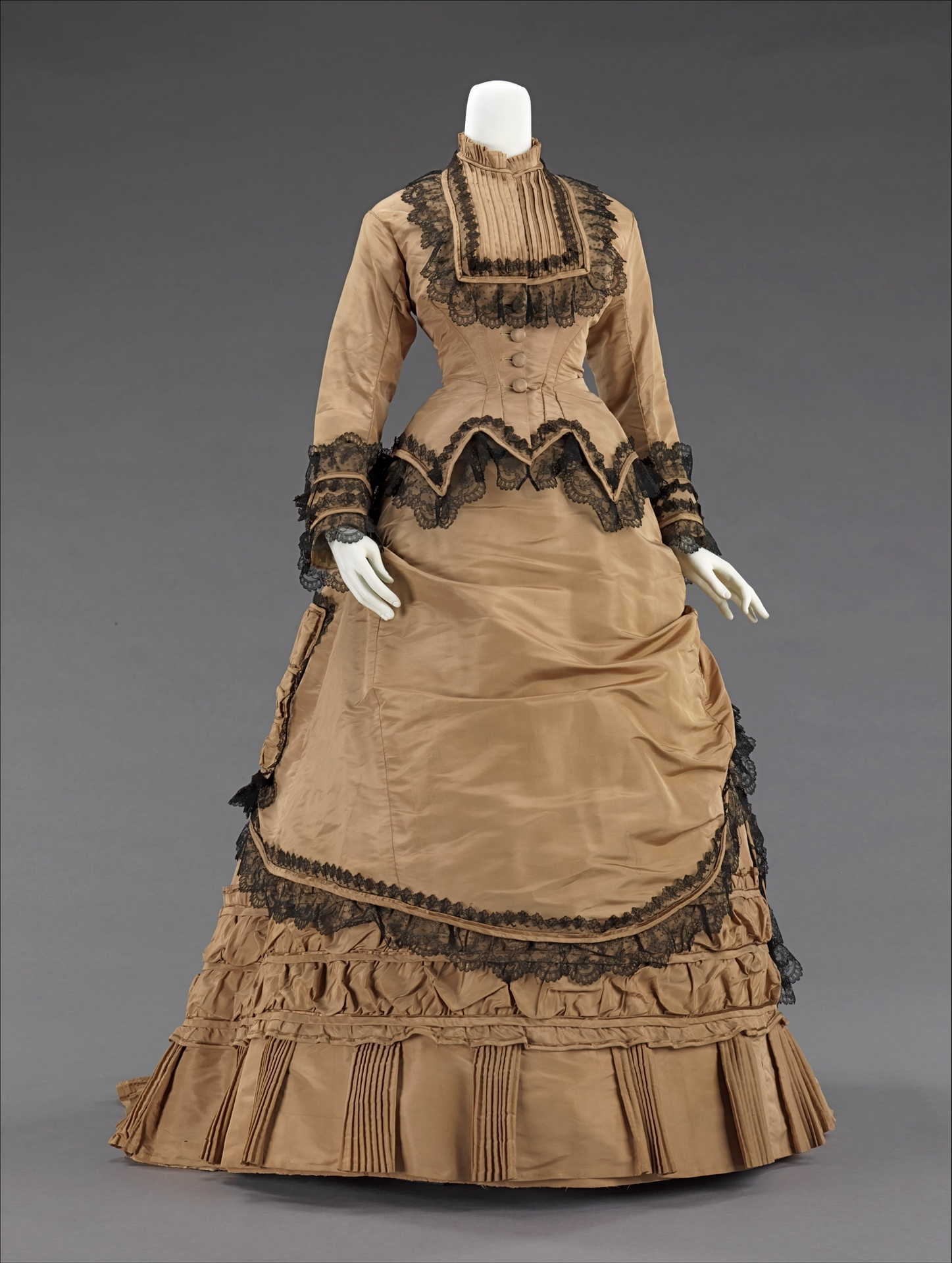
Walking dress 1870–1875 (American)

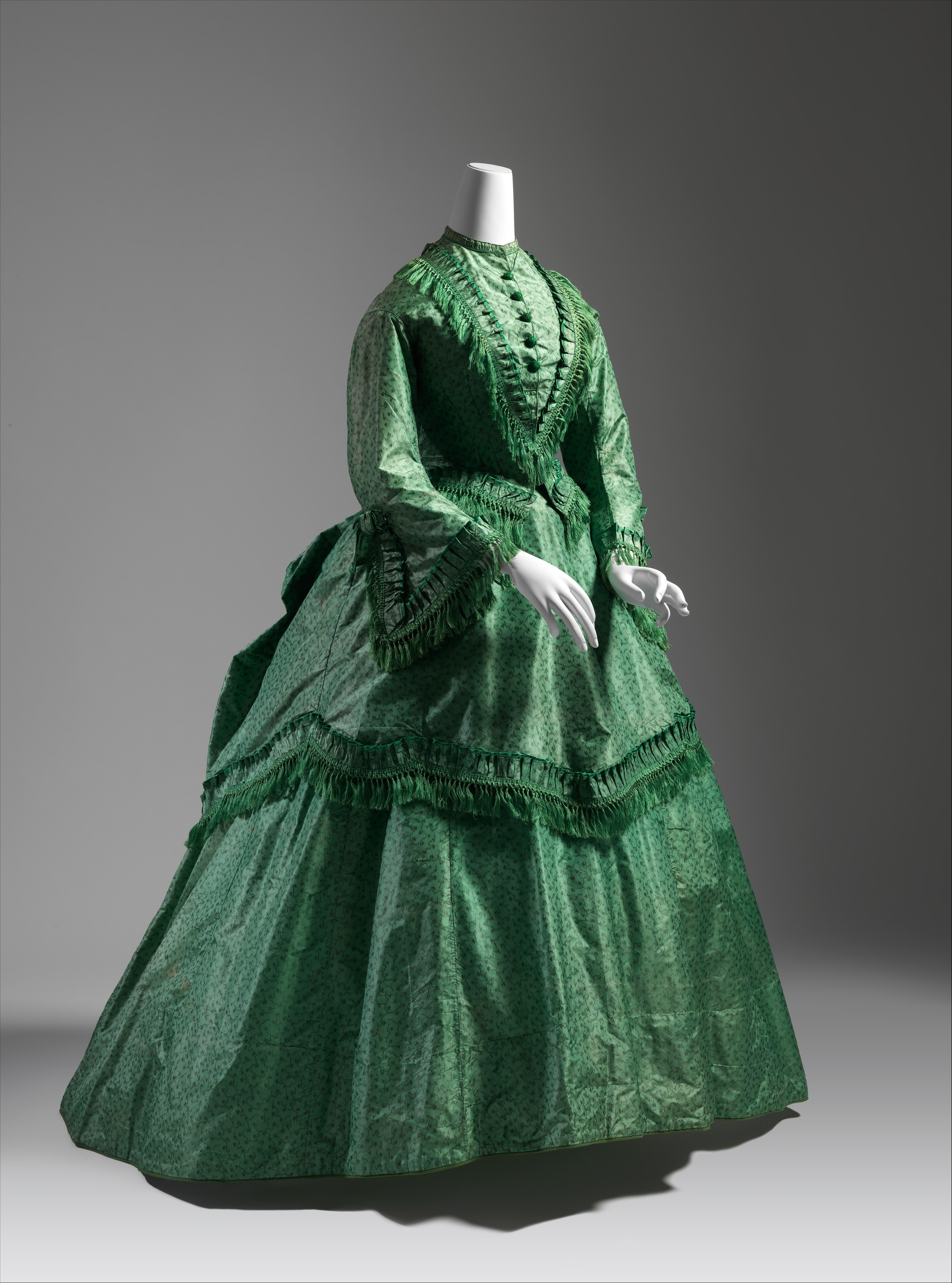
Dress c. 1870 (British)

==== 1880s–1890 ====
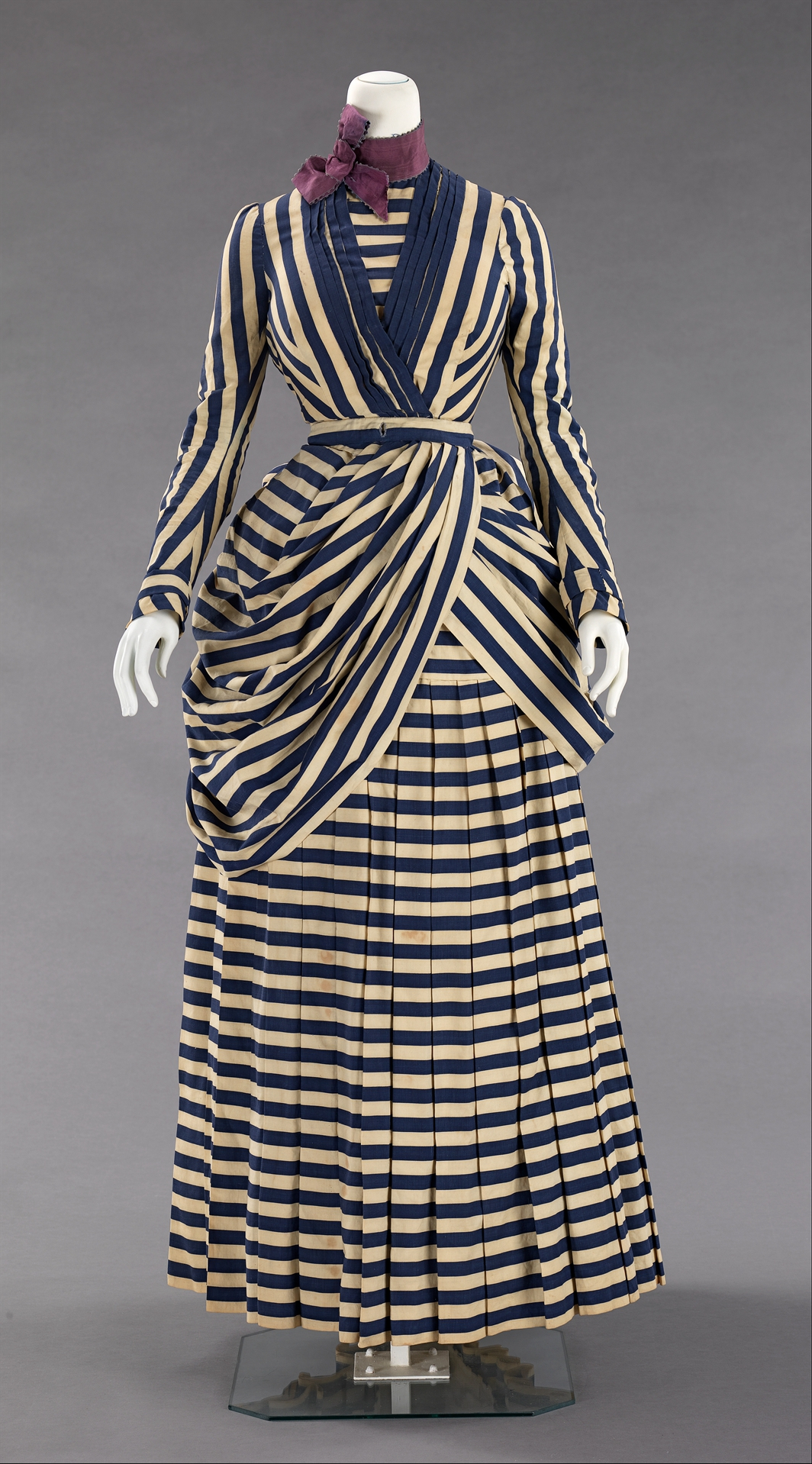
Dress 1885–1888 (American)

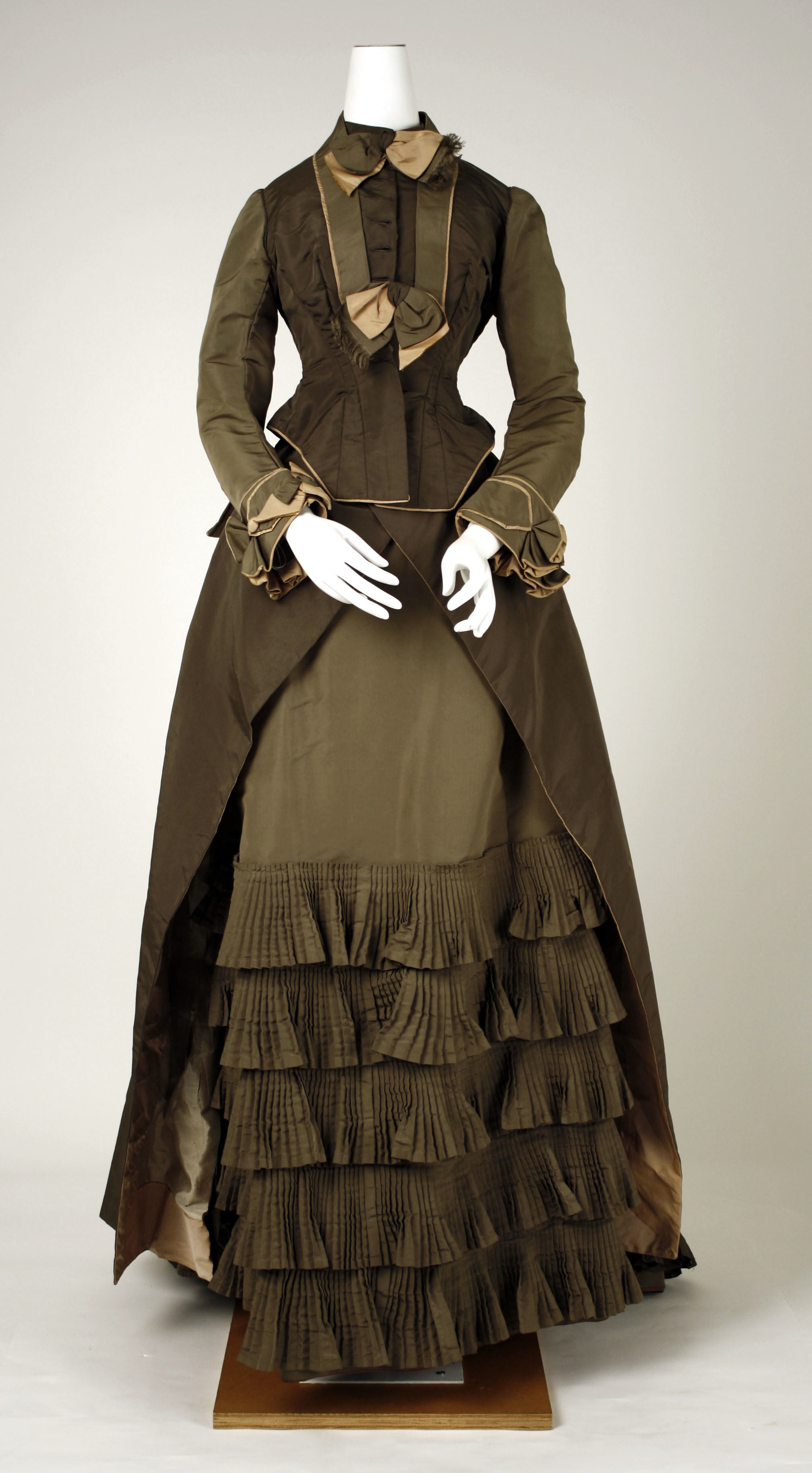
Dress c. 1880 (American)

==== 1890s–1900 ====
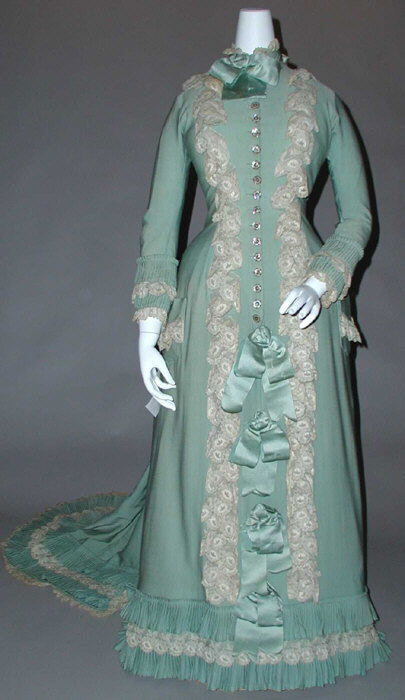
Tea gown 1890 (French)

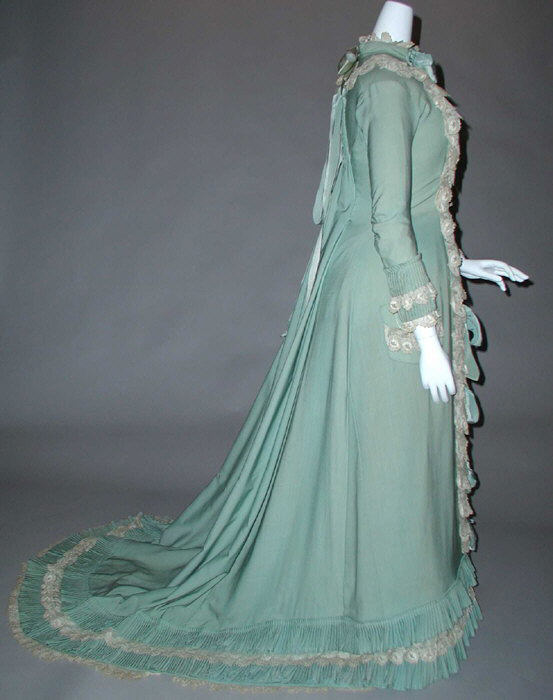
Tea gown 1890 (French)

=== Hairstyles and headwear ===
==== Accessories ====
Handmade shawls, fans and umbrellas, hats, purses and handbags were popular.

== Men's fashion ==
=== Suit style ===
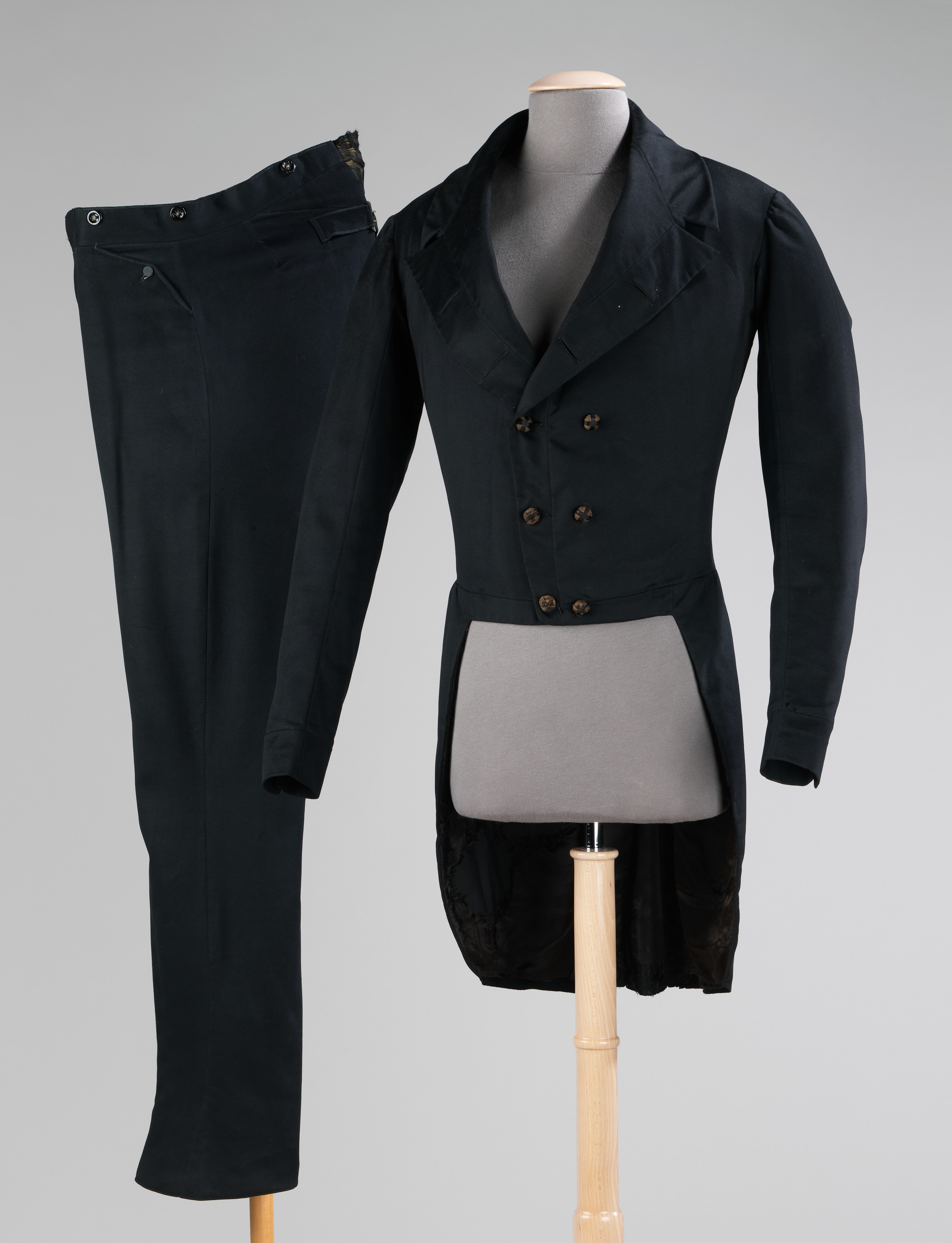
19th century men's suit (American)

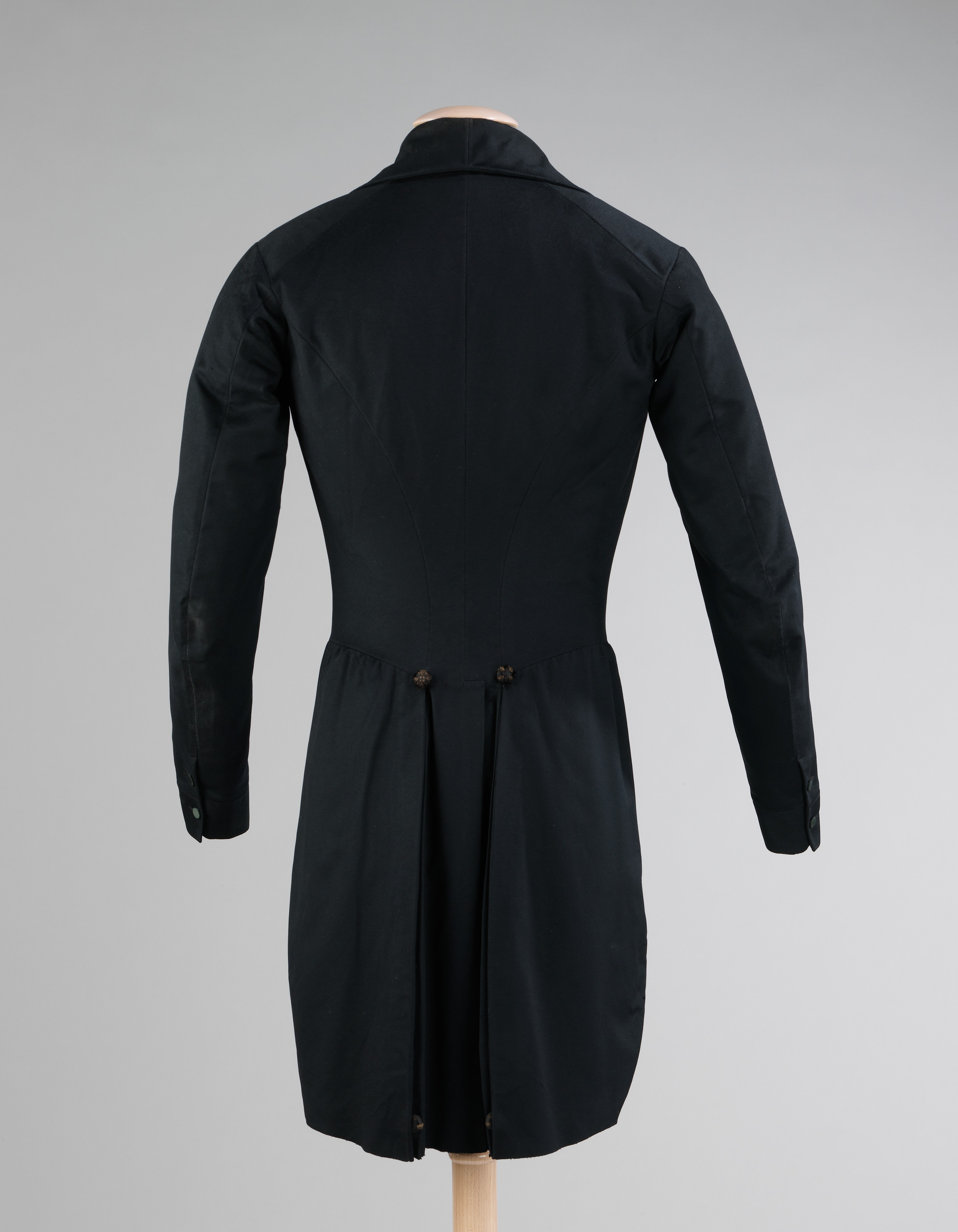
19th century men's suit jacket (American)

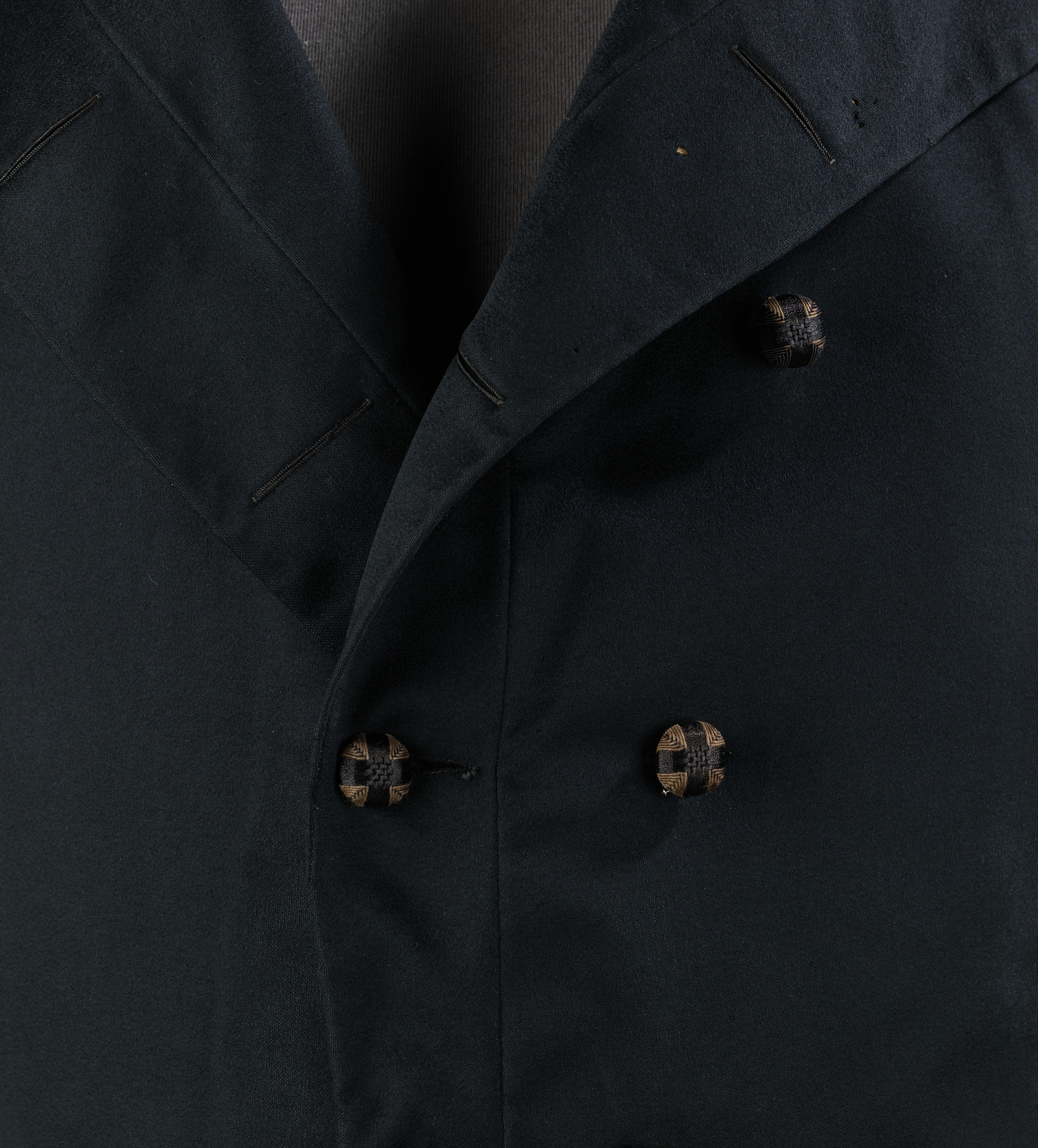
19th century men's suit jacket detail (American)

== Children's fashion ==
For most of the 19th century babies wore "long, white dresses with short sleeves" whilst toddlers and young children wore "short dresses with frilled drawers peeking out underneath".

As children grew into young adults the dress styles mimicked that of the elder generation, with the only difference being more simplistic styles and shorter lengths.

== Workwear ==
Introduced in the beginning of the century, proper work clothes and work uniforms were a sign of a new era. It started off with small businesses and factories creating a specific uniform for their company. Not too long later, government bodies such as the police, firefighters, and miners adopted the idea.

== See also ==
- 1795–1820 in Western fashion
- 1820s in Western fashion
- 1830s in Western fashion
- 1840s in Western fashion
- 1850s in Western fashion
- 1860s in Western fashion
- 1870s in Western fashion
- 1880s in Western fashion
- 1890s in Western fashion
