= Ruffle (sewing) =

Strip of fabric, lace, or ribbon gathered on one edge and applied as trimming

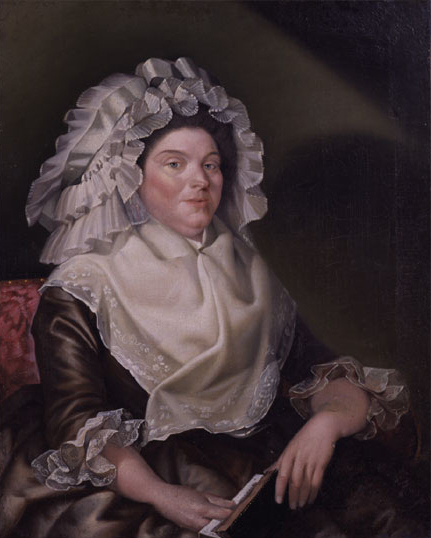
Portrait of a woman wearing a heavily ruffled cap, 1789

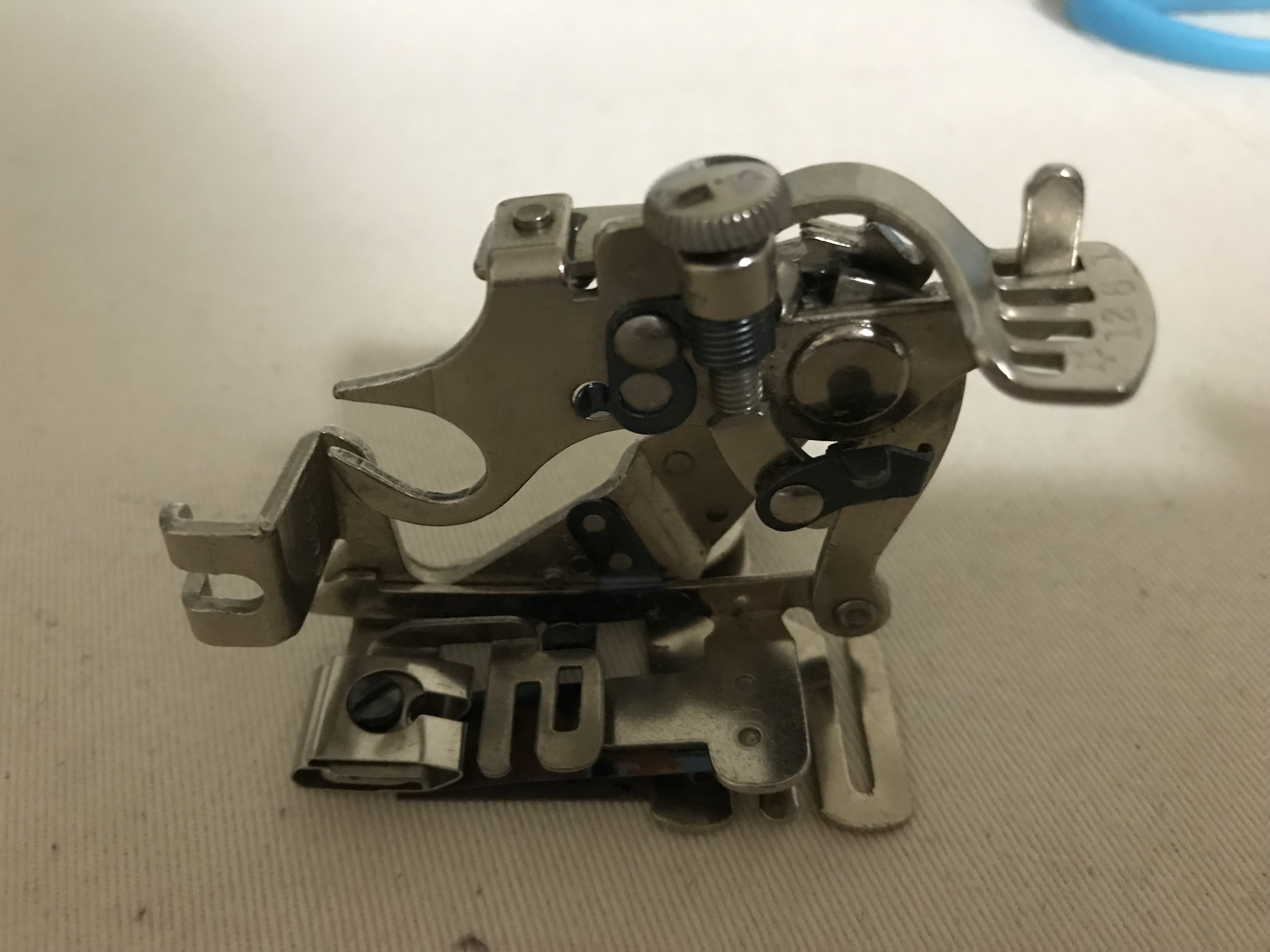
Mechanical ruffler by Singer, used on domestic sewing machines

In sewing and dressmaking, a ruffle, frill, or furbelow is a strip of fabric, lace or ribbon tightly gathered or pleated on one edge and applied to a garment, bedding, or other textile as a form of trimming.

Ruffles can be made from a single layer of fabric (which may need a hem) or from a doubled layer. Plain ruffles are usually cut on the straight grain.

Ruffles may be gathered by using a gathering stitch, or by passing the fabric through a mechanical ruffler (an attachment available for some sewing-machines).

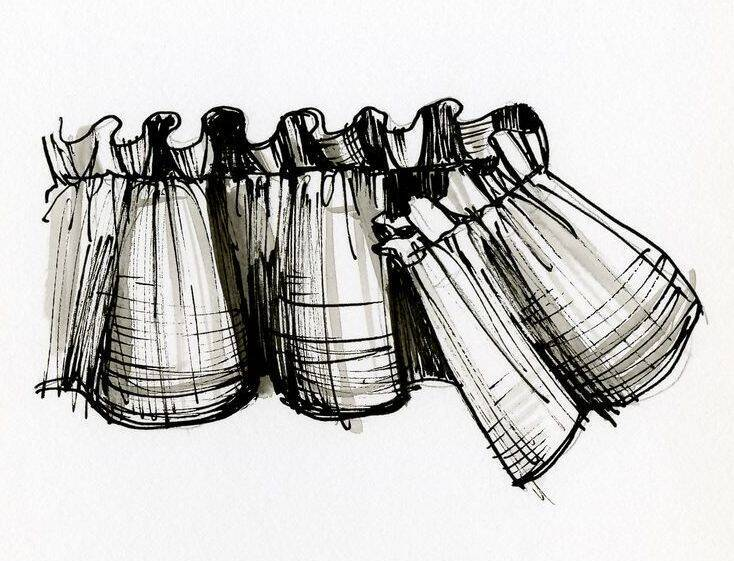
Sketch of a flounce

A flounce involves a particular type of fabric manipulation that creates a similar look but with less bulk. The term derives from earlier terms: frounce or fronce. A wavy effect is achieved without gathers or pleats by cutting a curved (or even circular) strip of fabric and applying the inner or shorter edge to the garment. The depth of the curve as well as the width of the fabric determines the depth of the flounce. A godet is a circle wedge that can be inserted into a flounce to further deepen the outer floating wave without adding additional bulk at the point of attachment to the body of the garment, such as at the hemline, collar or sleeve.

Ruffles appeared at the draw-string necklines of full chemises in the 15th century and evolved into the separately-constructed ruff of the 16th century. Ruffles and flounces remained a fashionable form of trim, off-and-on, into modern times. In the 21st century, ruffles have made a significant comeback as a trendy design-element in fashion, particularly in prom- and wedding-dresses. This resurgence can be attributed to a growing appreciation for romantic and feminine aesthetics, as ruffles add an enchanting flair to garments. Ruffles are versatile and can be incorporated into dresses of all styles, from elegant gowns to playful party-dresses, making them appealing to women of all ages. Many renowned fashion-brands have embraced this trend, showcasing ruffles as a key feature in their collections. High-end designers and fast-fashion labels alike produce chic items with ruffled details, highlighting their popularity in contemporary fashion. As a result, ruffles have become synonymous with elegance and celebration, allowing wearers to express their personal style while embracing this classic design element.

== See also ==
- Nun's veiling, a lightweight sheer woolen cloth; used in some flounces in the 19th century.

== General and cited references ==
- Arnold, Janet: Patterns of Fashion: the cut and construction of clothes for men and women 1560–1620, Macmillan, 1985. Revised edition 1986. (ISBN 0-8967-6083-9)
- Baumgarten, Linda: What Clothes Reveal: The Language of Clothing in Colonial and Federal America, Yale University Press, 2002. ISBN 0-300-09580-5
- Oxford English Dictionary
- Picken, Mary Brooks: The Fashion Dictionary, Funk and Wagnalls, 1957. (1973 edition, ISBN 0-308-10052-2)
- Smith, Alison: The Sewing Book, Dorling Kindersley Press, ISBN 978-1-4053-3555-3
- Tozer, Jane and Sarah Levitt, Fabric of Society: A Century of People and their Clothes 1770–1870, Laura Ashley Press, ISBN 0-9508913-0-4
