= Gather (knitting) =

Knitting technique

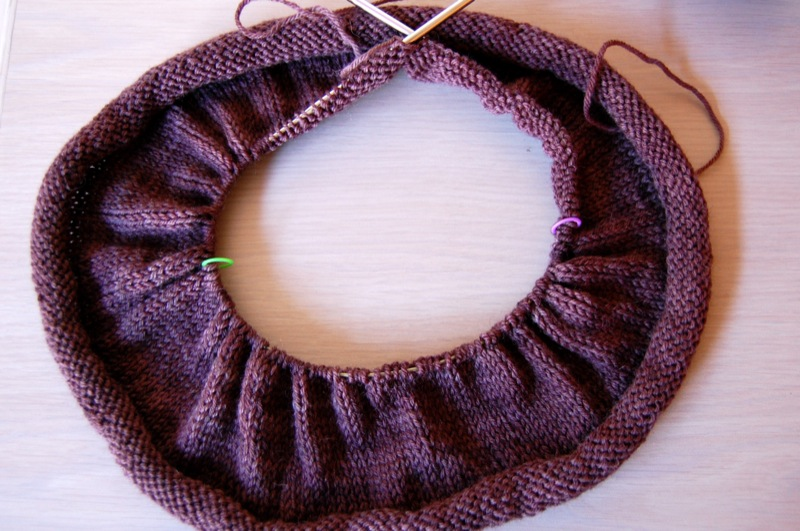
Gathers knit into a pullover sweater using stitch decreases.

In knitting, a gather draws stitches closer together within a row of knitting. Common methods include:

- In binding, a yarn loop is passed over 2 or more stitches in the same row (usually adjacent to the binding loop); also known as a pullover stitch.
- In clustering, the yarn is wound laterally around a set of stitches in the same row, possibly several times; also known as a wrap stitch.
- Smocking is a sewing or embroidery technique in which the tiny pleats are drawn together with thread or yarn. Before the development of elastic, smocking was used to create a stretchable, flexible fabric panel.

== Related techniques ==
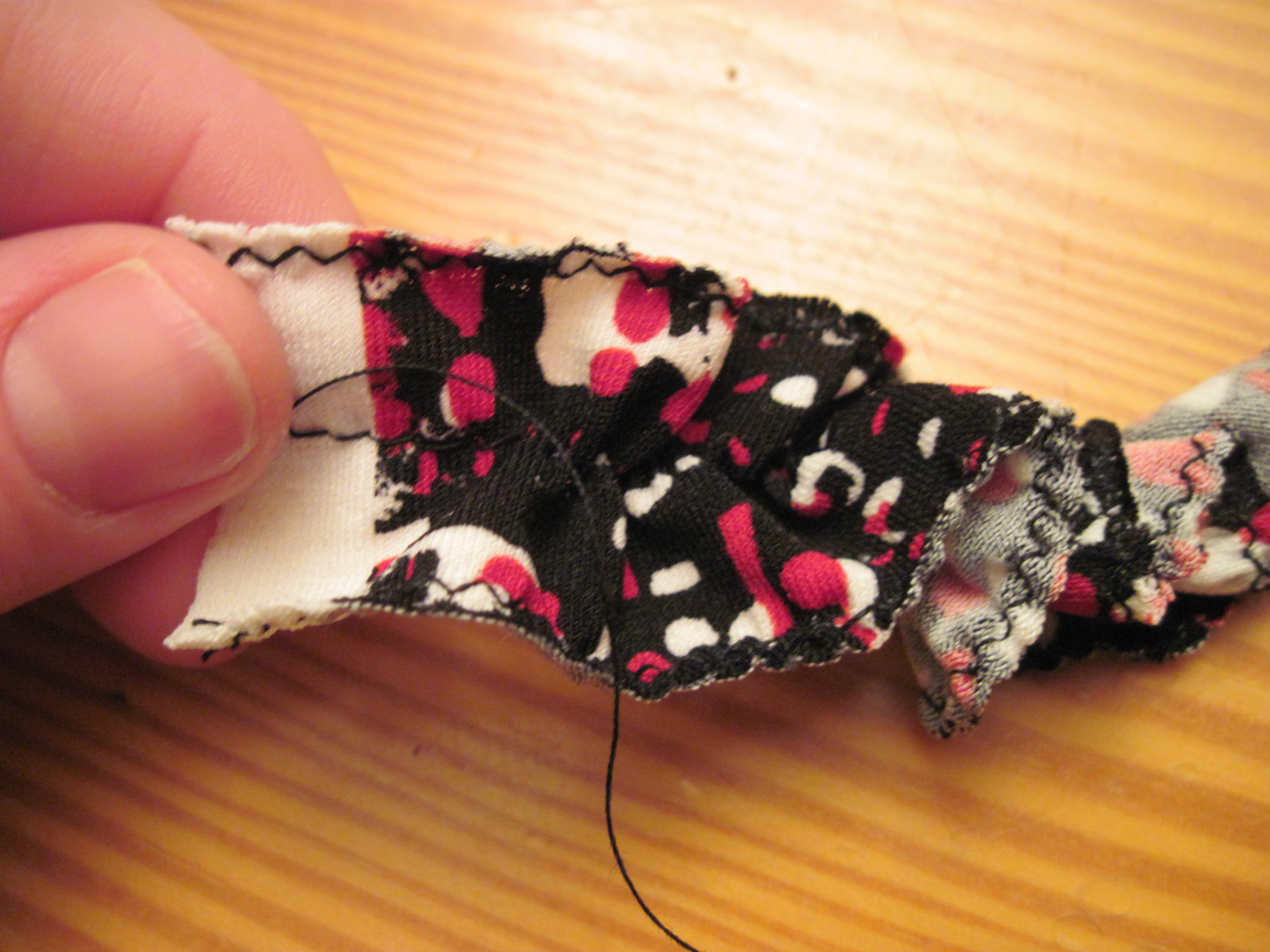
Ruching created by sewing stitches down the centre of a fabric strip, then pulling one end of the thread to gather the fabric.

In the sewing technique ruching (pronounced /ˈruːʃɪŋ/, ROO-shing also spelled rouching), a large number of increases are introduced in one row, which are then removed by decreases a few rows later. This produces many small vertical ripples or "ruches" in the fabric, effectively little pleats. The technique of shirring produces a similar effect by gathering the fabric into two parallel rows (not necessarily horizontal), usually achieved through smocking.
