= Clothing terminology =

Vocabulary used in the fashion business and clothing industry

Clothing terminology comprises the names of individual garments and classes of garments, as well as the specialized vocabularies of the trades that have designed, manufactured, marketed and sold clothing over hundreds of years.

Clothing terminology ranges from the arcane (watchet, a pale blue color name from the 16th century), and changes over time in response to fashion which in turn reflects social, artistic, and political trends.

== Categories ==
At its broadest, clothing terminology may be said to include names for:

- Classes of basic garments: shirt, coat, skirt, dress, suit, underwear, swimsuit
- Length, for skirts and dresses: micro-mini, mini, tea length, ballerina length, full length, midi, maxi; see also Wrap dress
- Contemporary and historical styles of garments: corset, frock coat, t-shirt, doublet
- Parts of garments: sleeve, collar, lapel
- Styles of these: juliette sleeve, Peter Pan collar
- Clothing details: pocket, french cuff, zipper
- Functional uses: base layer, insulation layer, outer shell
- Traditional garments: cheongsam, kilt, dirndl, fustanella
- Fashions and "anti-fashions": preppy, New Look, hip-hop, rational dress
- Fabrics: denim, wool, chiffon, velvet, satin, silk, cotton
- Fabric treatments: fabric painting, transfers, ikat, tie-dye, batik
- Fabric manipulation: pleat, tuck, gather, smocking
- Colors and dyes: madder red, indigo, isabella
- Sewing terms: cut, hem, armscye, lining
- Patternmaking terms: sloper, toile
- Methods of manufacture: haute couture, bespoke tailoring, ready-to-wear
- Retailers' terms:
  - Size ranges: Small, Medium, Large, XL (Extra Large), XXL (Double Extra Large), Junior, Misses, Petite, Plus Size, Big-and-Tall
  - Retail seasons: back-to-school, holiday, resort, seasonal
  - Departments: special occasion, sportswear, bridge fashion
  - Degrees of formality: formal wear, bridal, business casual
  - Market: high end, high street, ethical consumer, cut price

== Persistence ==
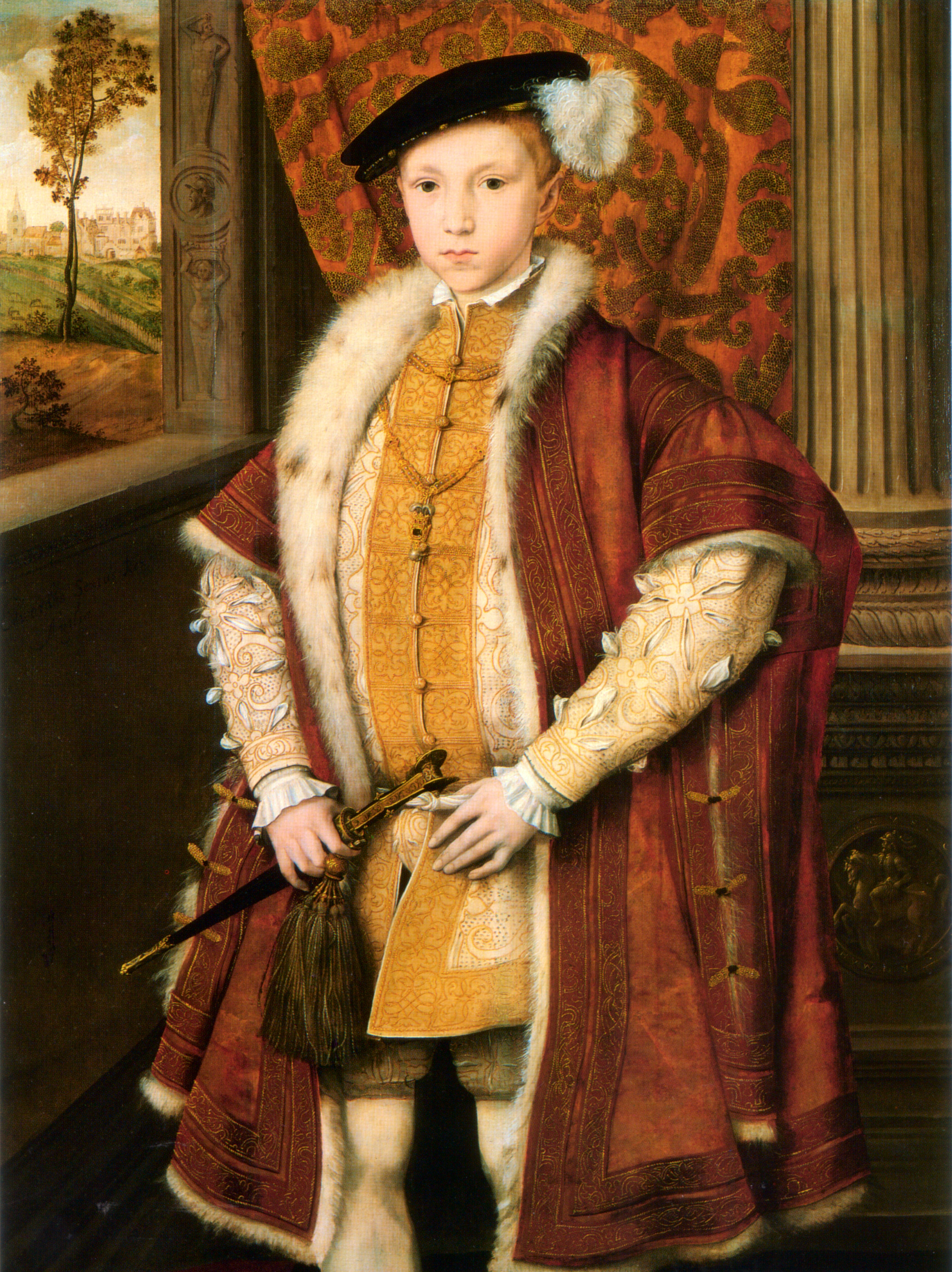
King Edward VI in a red fur-lined gown with split hanging sleeves, a men's fashion of the mid-16th century

Despite the constant introduction of new terms by fashion designers, clothing manufacturers, and marketers, the names for several basic garment classes in English are very stable over time. Gown, shirt/skirt, frock, and coat are all attested back to the early medieval period.

Gown (from Medieval Latin gunna) was a basic clothing term for hundreds of years, referring to a garment that hangs from the shoulders. In Medieval and Renaissance England gown referred to a loose outer garment worn by both men and women, sometimes short, more often ankle length, with sleeves. By the 18th century gown had become a standard category term for a women's dress, a meaning it retained until the mid-20th century. Only in the last few decades has gown lost this general meaning in favor of dress. Today the term gown is rare except in specialized cases: academic dress or cap and gown, evening gown, nightgown, hospital gown, and so on (see Gown).

Shirt and skirt are originally the same word, the former being the southern and the latter the northern pronunciation in early Middle English.

Coat remains a term for an overgarment, its essential meaning for the last thousand years (see Coat).

== New sources ==
Names for new styles or fashions in clothing are frequently the deliberate inventions of fashion designers or clothing manufacturers; these include Chanel's Little Black Dress (a term which has survived) and Lanvin's robe de style (which has not). Other terms are of more obscure origin.

=== Personal names ===
Clothing styles are frequently named after people—often with a military connection:

- The Jinnah Cap is a fur qaraqul hat named after the founder of Pakistan, Muhammad Ali Jinnah.
- The Garibaldi jacket or Garibaldi shirt were bright red woolen garments for women with black embroidery or braid and military details popular in the 1860s; they are named after the Italian revolutionary Giuseppe Garibaldi who visited England in 1863.
- The Eisenhower jacket or "Ike" jacket is a waist-length, military jacket of World War II origins. Called the "Jacket, Field, Wool, M-1944", it was commissioned by then General Dwight Eisenhower as a new field jacket for the US Forces in Northern Europe. The jacket was based on the British Army 'Battle Dress' jacket of the same era.
- The cardigan is a knitted jacket or button-front sweater created to keep British soldiers warm in Russian winters. It is named for James Brudenell, 7th Earl of Cardigan, who led the Charge of the Light Brigade in the Crimean War (1854).
- The Mao jacket is a very plain (often grey), high-collared, shirtlike jacket customarily worn by Mao Zedong and the people of China during his regime. Its drab design and uniformity was a reaction to pre-Revolution class distinctions of clothes, with elites dressing in elaborate silks, while poor laborers wore very rough clothes.
- The Nehru jacket is a uniform jacket without lapels or collars, popularized by Jawaharlal Nehru, the first Prime Minister of independent India.
- The Bloomer Costume was a type of women's clothing introduced in the Antebellum period, that changed the style from dresses to a more male-type style, which was devised by Amelia Bloomer.
- The Wellington boot was a cavalry boot devised by the Duke of Wellington, originally made from leather, but now normally rubber.
- The Stetson hat is named after the founder of the John B. Stetson Company.
- The Mackintosh is a waterproof coat made from rubberised fabric, named after its inventor Charles Macintosh.
- The Gandhi cap is a white colored sidecap made from khadi. It was popularised by Mahatma Gandhi during the Indian independence movement.

=== Place names ===
Another fertile source for clothing terms is place names, which usually reflect the origin (or supposed origin) of a fashion. Modern terms such as Bermuda shorts, Hawaiian shirts, and Fair Isle sweaters are the latest in a long line that stretches back to holland (linen), damask ("from Damascus"), polonaise ("in the fashion of Polish women"), basque, jersey (originally Jersey frock), Balaclava, Capri pants, mantua, and denim ("serge de Nîmes" after the city).

=== Costume historian's terms ===
Costume historians, with a "rearward-looking" view, require names for clothing styles that were not used (or needed) when the styles were actually worn. For example, the Van Dyke collar is so-called from its appearances in 17th century portraits by Anthony van Dyck, and the Watteau pleats of the robe á la française are called after their appearance in the portraits of Antoine Watteau.

Similarly, terms may be applied ahistorically to entire categories of garments, so that corset is applied to garments that were called stays or a pair of bodies until the introduction of the word corset in the late 18th century. And dress is now applied to any women's garment consisting of a bodice and skirt, although for most of its history dress simply meant clothing, or a complete outfit of clothing with its appropriate accessories.

=== Short forms ===
A notable trend at the turn of the 21st century is "cute" short forms: camisole becomes cami, hooded sweaters or sweatshirts become hoodies, and as of 2005, short or "shrunken" cardigans are cardies.

The much-older term shimmy for "slip" is most likely a false singular from chemise.
