= Virago (disambiguation) =

A virago is a strong, brave, or warlike woman.

Virago may also refer to:

== Media ==
- Virago Press, a British publishing company
- Virago (EP), a 1999 EP by Theatre of Tragedy
- "Virago", a song from the 2005 album Razorbliss by Flowing Tears
- Virago, a fictional Star Wars spacecraft
- Virago, a fictional crimefighter slain by the supervillain Onomatopoeia in the comic book Green Arrow
- Virago, an American production company in Denver in the 1970s

== Ships ==
- HMS Virago, four ships of the British Royal Navy, including:
  - HMS Virago (1842), a Driver-class wooden paddle sloop
  - HMS Virago (1895), a B-class torpedo boat destroyer
  - HMS Virago (R75), a World War II V-class destroyer

== Other uses ==
- Virago sleeve, a women's clothing fashion of the early 17th century
- Virago Sound, on the north coast of Graham Island, Queen Charlotte Islands, British Columbia, Canada
- Yamaha Virago, a series of motorcycles, produced from 1981 to 2007
- Virago (horse)
