= Bell sleeve =

Style of sleeves with flares toward the bottom

A bell sleeve can be either long or short and is usually set smoothly into the armscye (no pleating or shirring) and flares toward the bottom. Bell sleeves end anywhere from the elbow to the wrist. Flared sleeves ending at the upper bicep are similarly shaped, but are instead called butterfly sleeves. The effect is reminiscent of a bell in its shape. If the sleeve is relatively full in circumference and is gathered or pleated into both the armhole and at the bottom, it is called a Bishop's Sleeve.

== History ==
Bell sleeves were originally found on a garment called a chasuble, which was the dress of clergymen during medieval times. The religious association of these sleeves eventually dissipated at which point the bell sleeve became adapted by the upper class. In the 1500s, the rich began to stylize the bell sleeve by making them more dramatic in size and more elaborate in decor. The trend of this sleeve made its way from the elite of France to England, where this style really took off and made its impact. The movement of the fashion trend of this sleeve moving from the lower class to the upper class is now referenced as the upward-flow theory.

== Image gallery ==
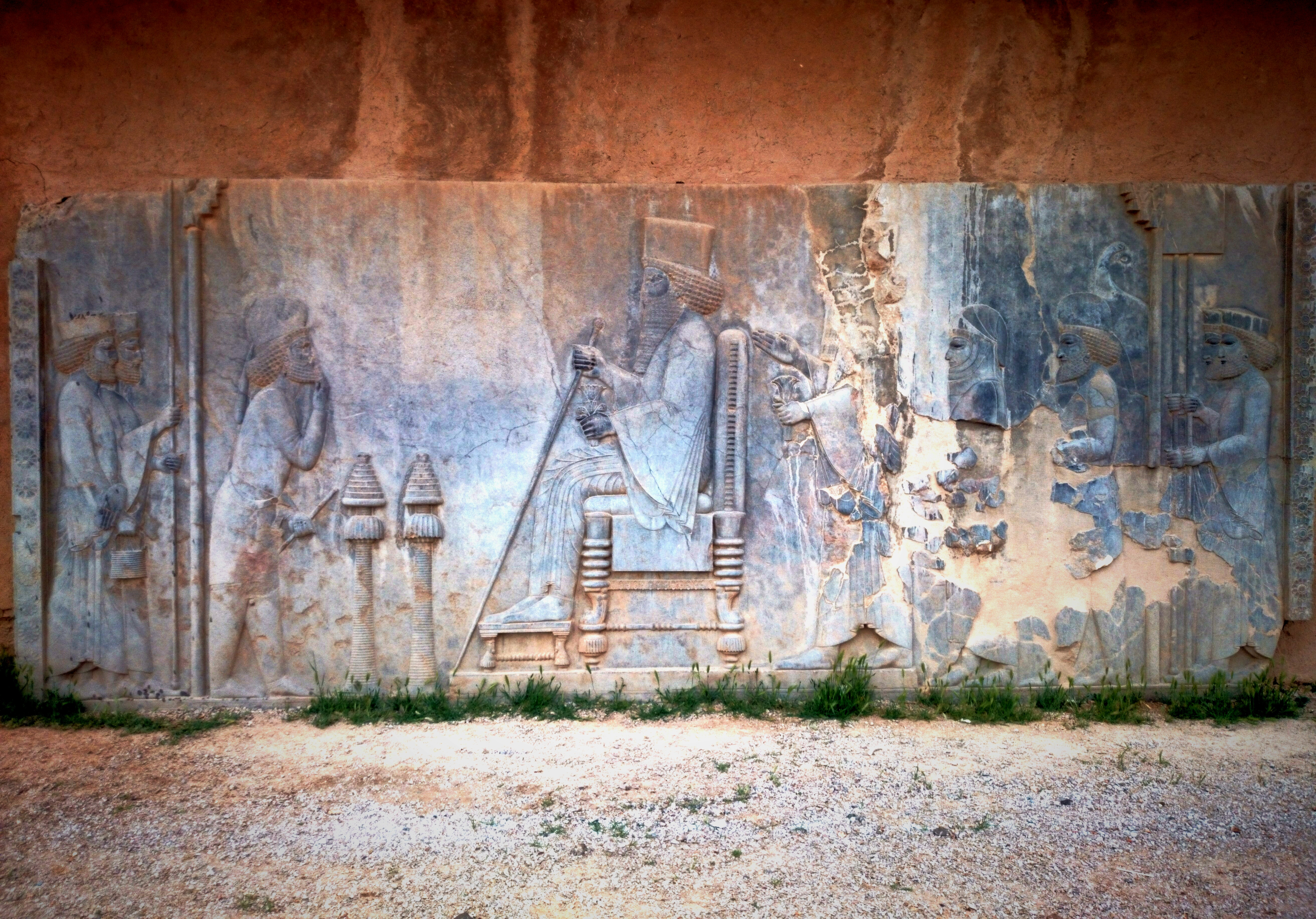
Clothing with bell sleeves from the Achaemenid king, Khashayar shah, 5th Century BC.

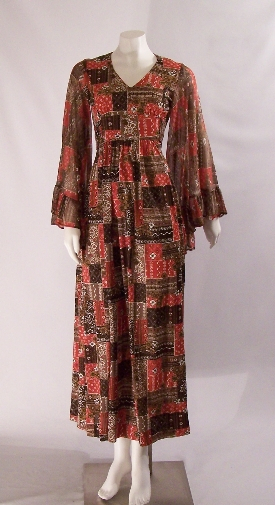
A vintage maxi dress from the 1970s featuring bell sleeves.

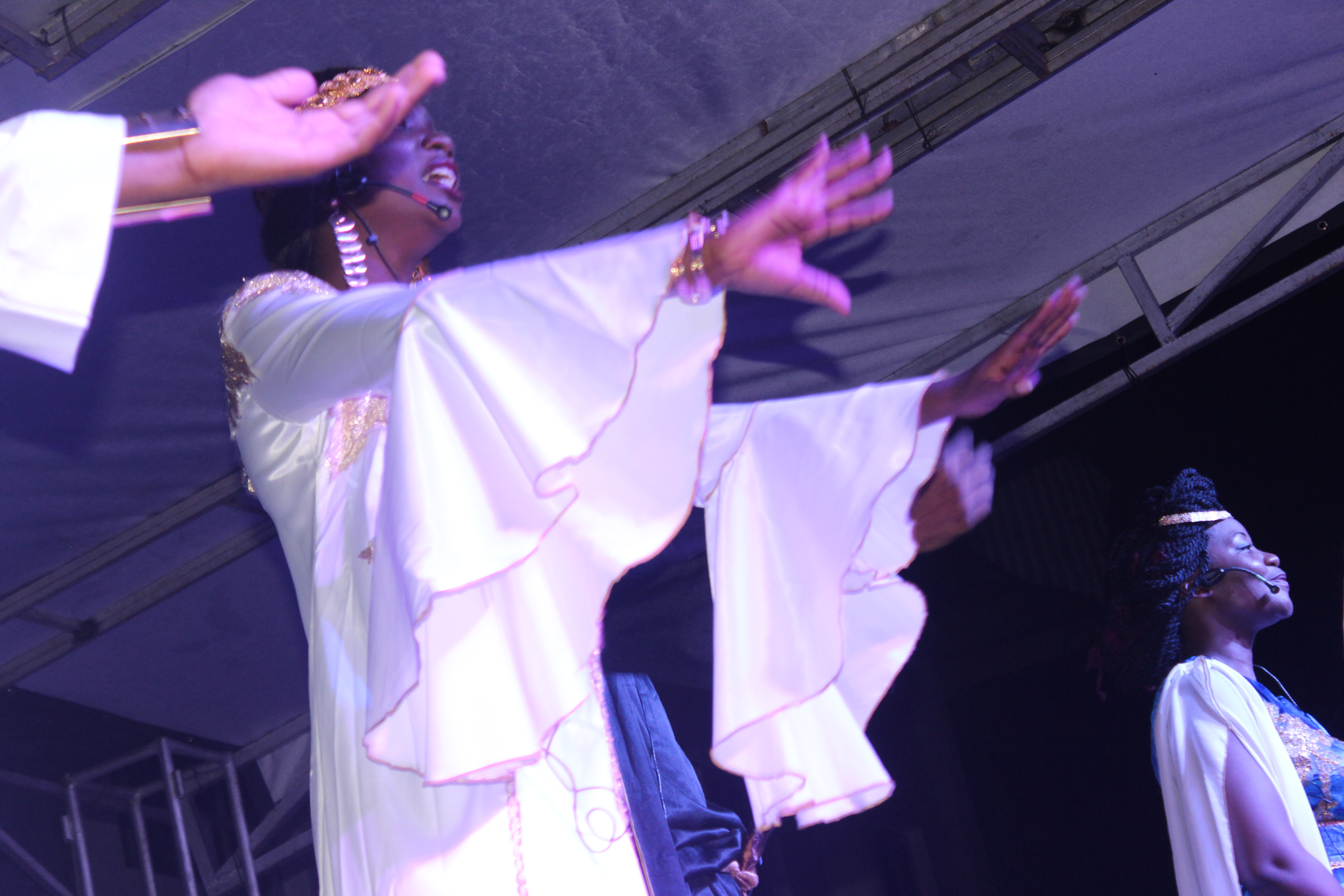
A performer from the Ivory Coast, wearing a dress with bell sleeves.

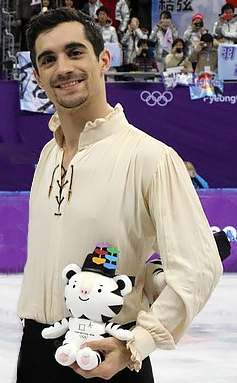
Figure skater Javier Fernandez wearing a shirt with Bishop's sleeves.

== See also ==
- Sleeve
- Bell-bottoms
