= Singer puzzle box =

Collection of accessories for a sewing machine

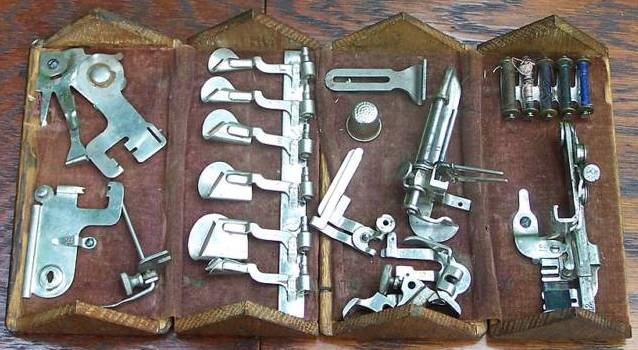
"Style No. 14" puzzle box

A Singer puzzle box is a collection of accessories for a sewing machine. Produced by the Singer Manufacturing Company during the 19th and 20th centuries, these neat and compact kits provide supplies and attachments for easing many common sewing tasks. At the time they were called 'Style' boxes, and were numbered consecutively from 1 ("Style No. 1") to 14 as newer versions evolved from older ones. They are now antiques, in museums and collections, although many extant sets are still in service.

The boxes include accessory attachments for hemming, braiding, underbraiding, tucking, shirring, binding, quilting, and ruffling, plus spare needles, bobbins, screws, and screwdrivers.

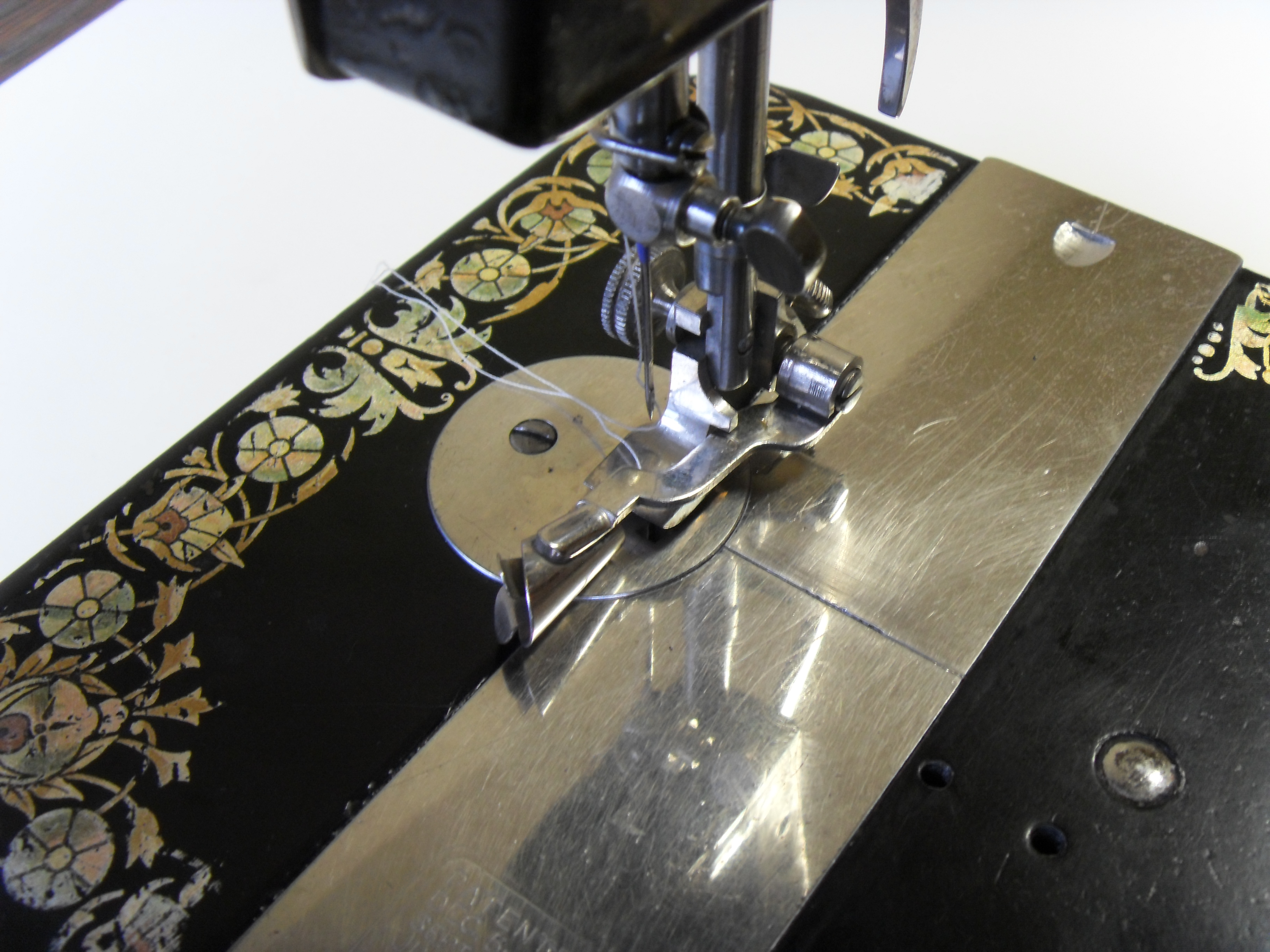
Binder foot

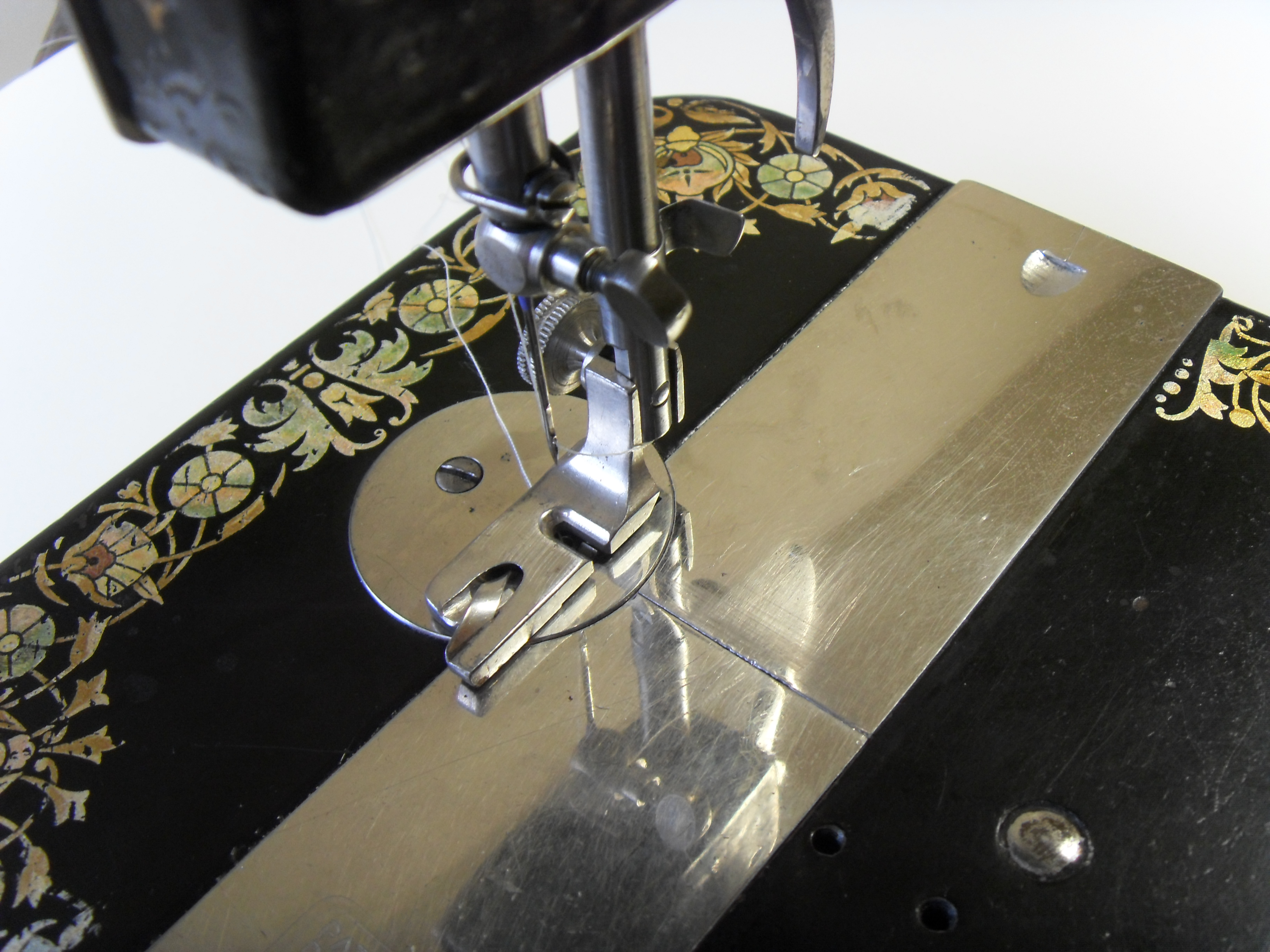
Braider foot

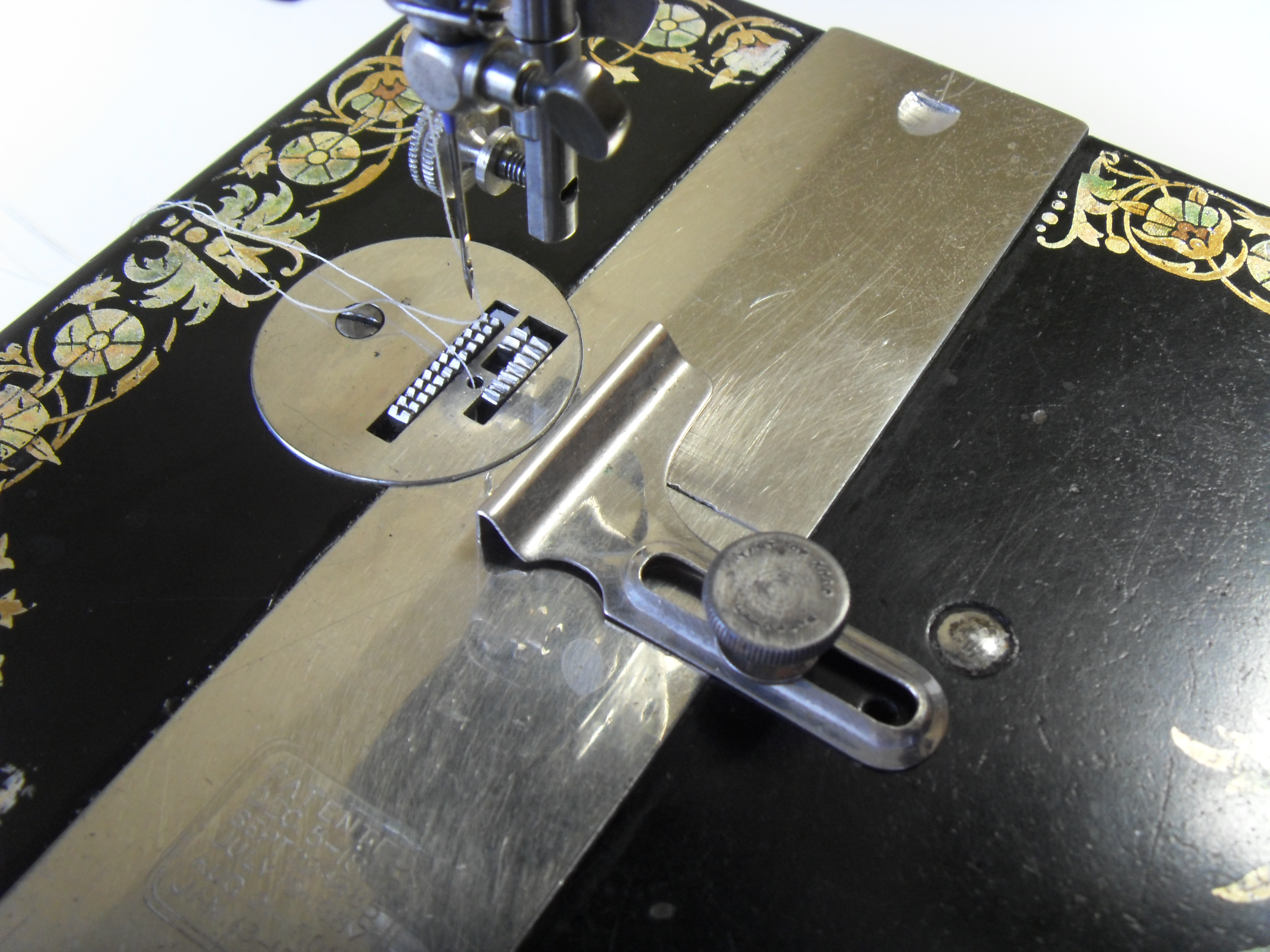
Fabric guide

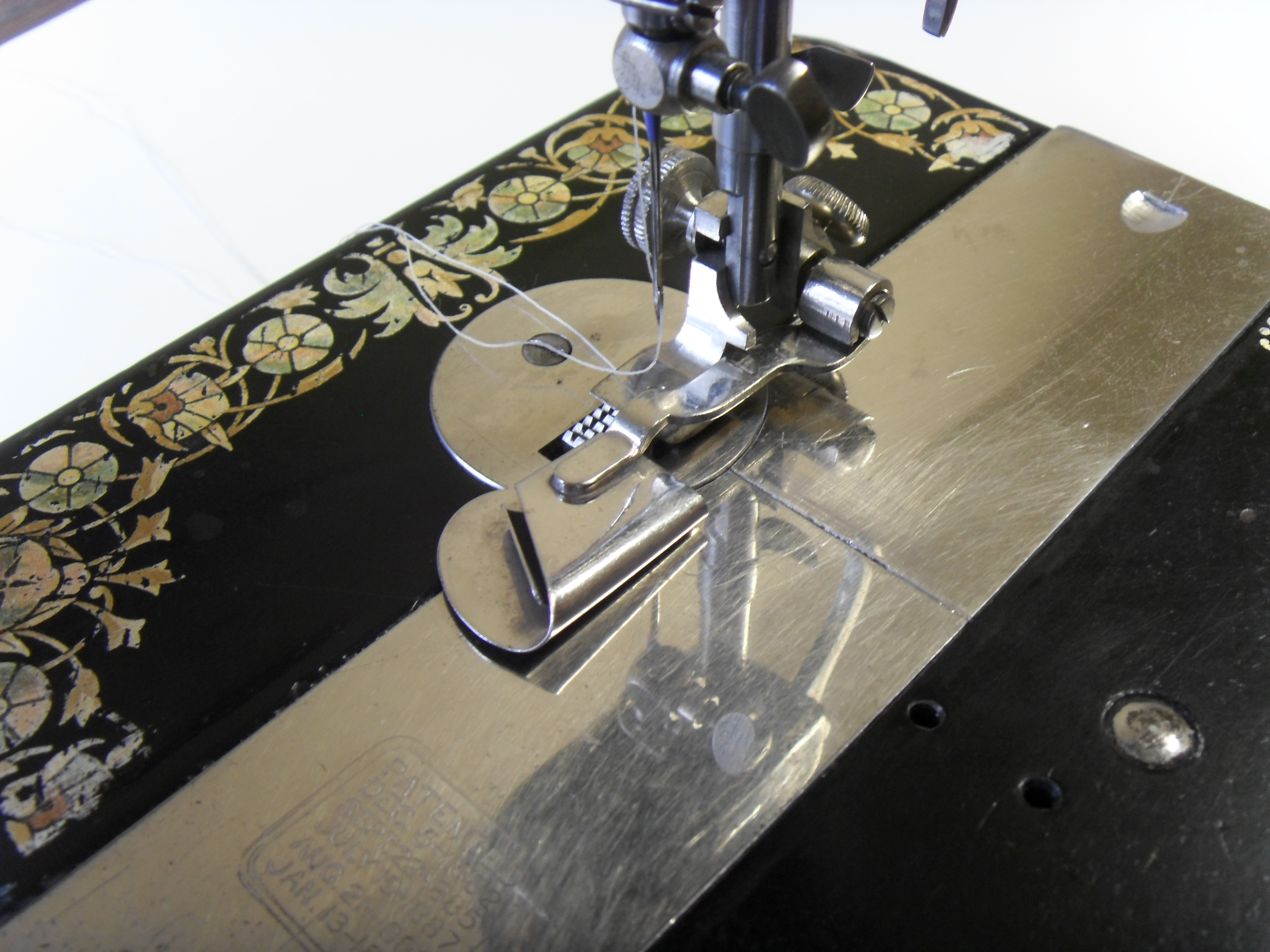
Hemmer foot (number 4)

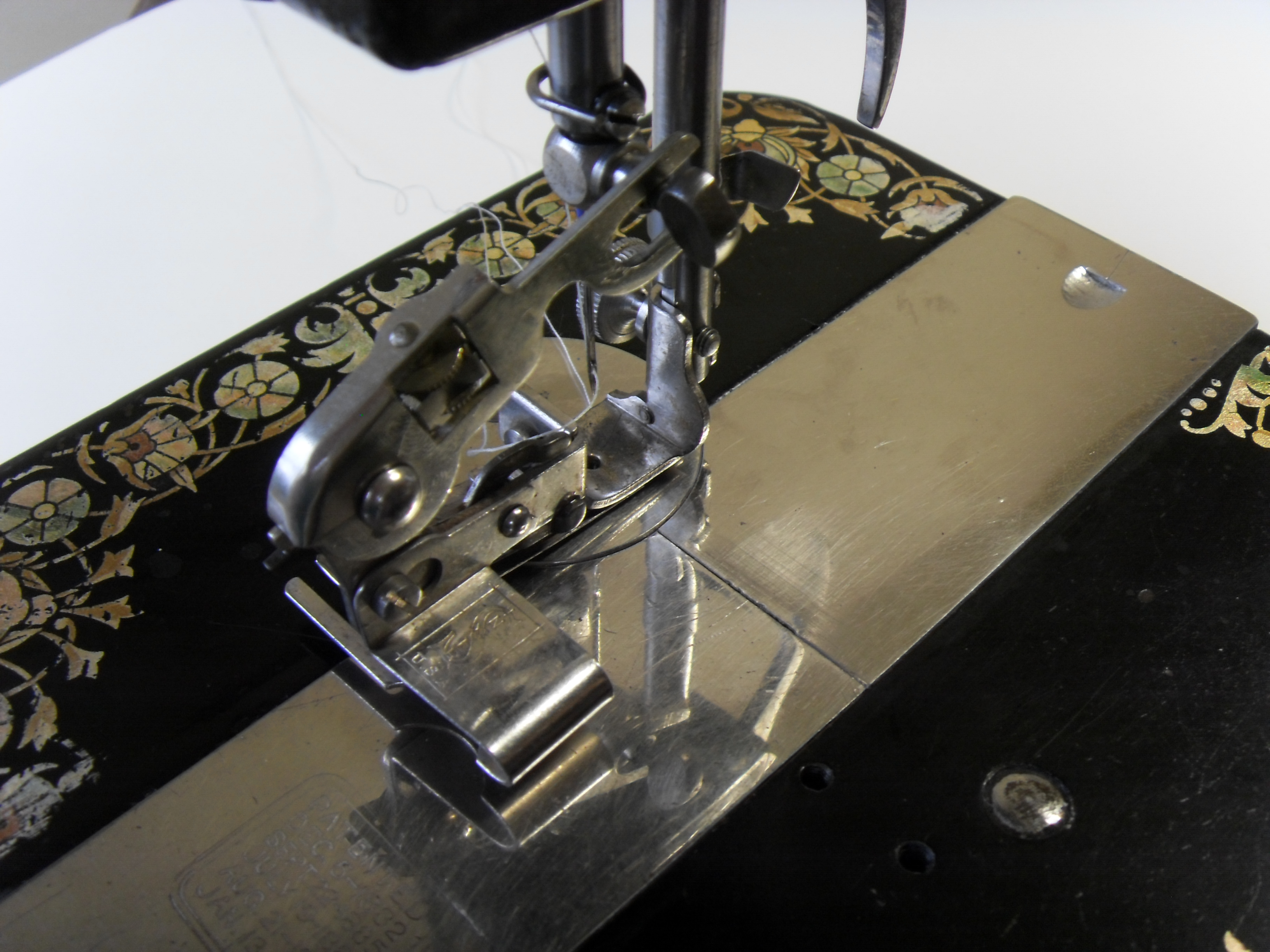
Ruffler

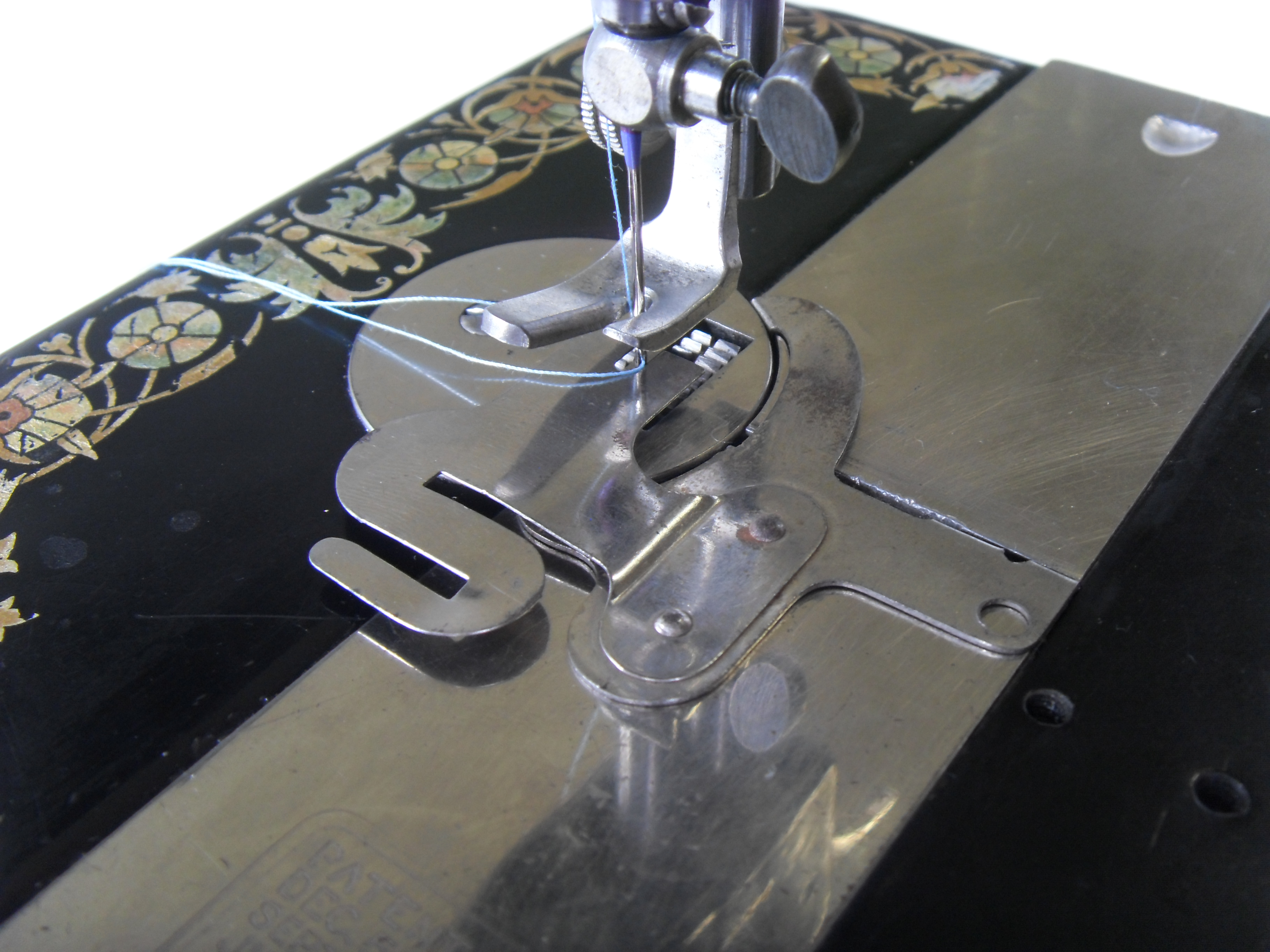
Shirring plate

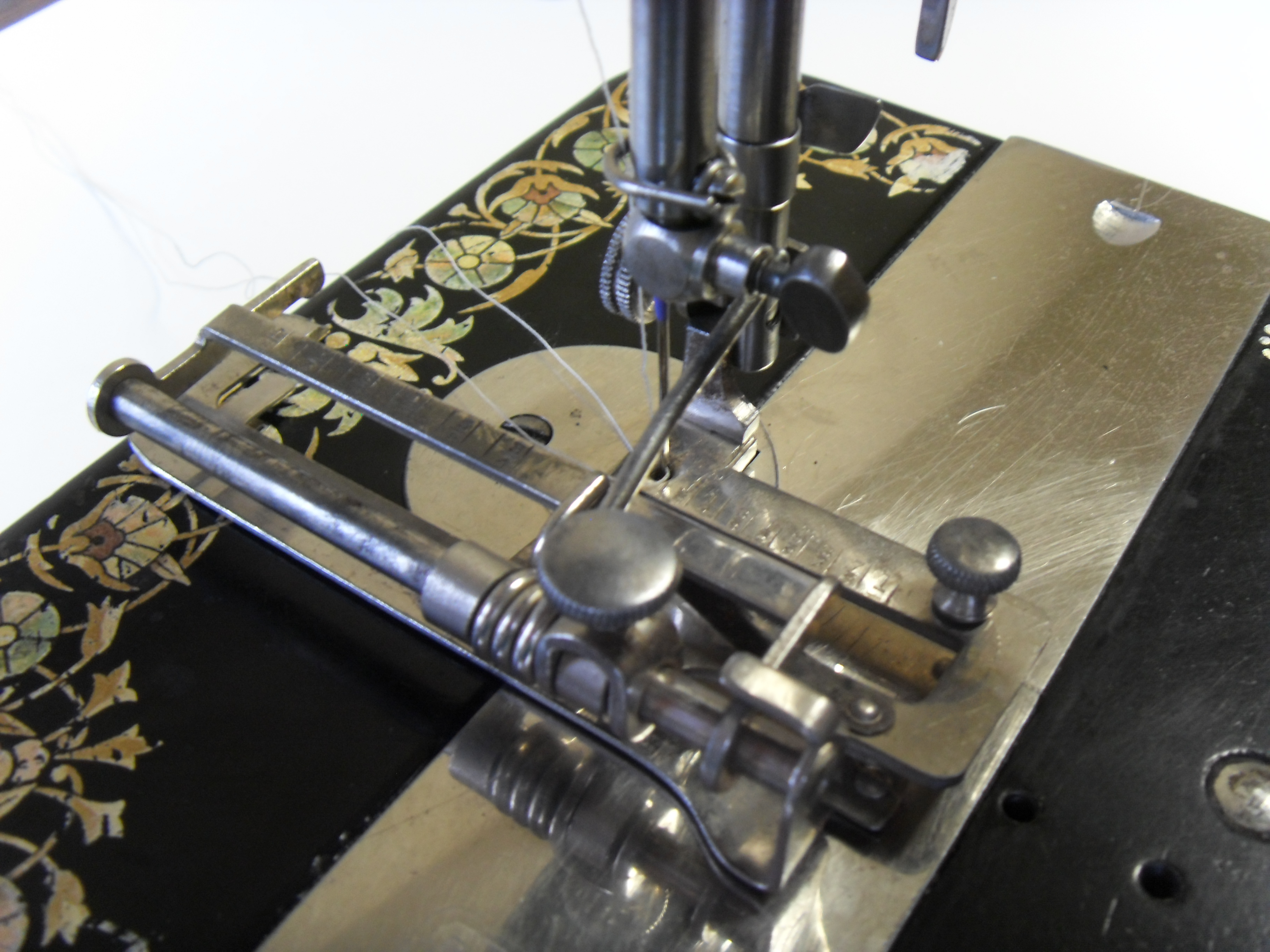
Tucker

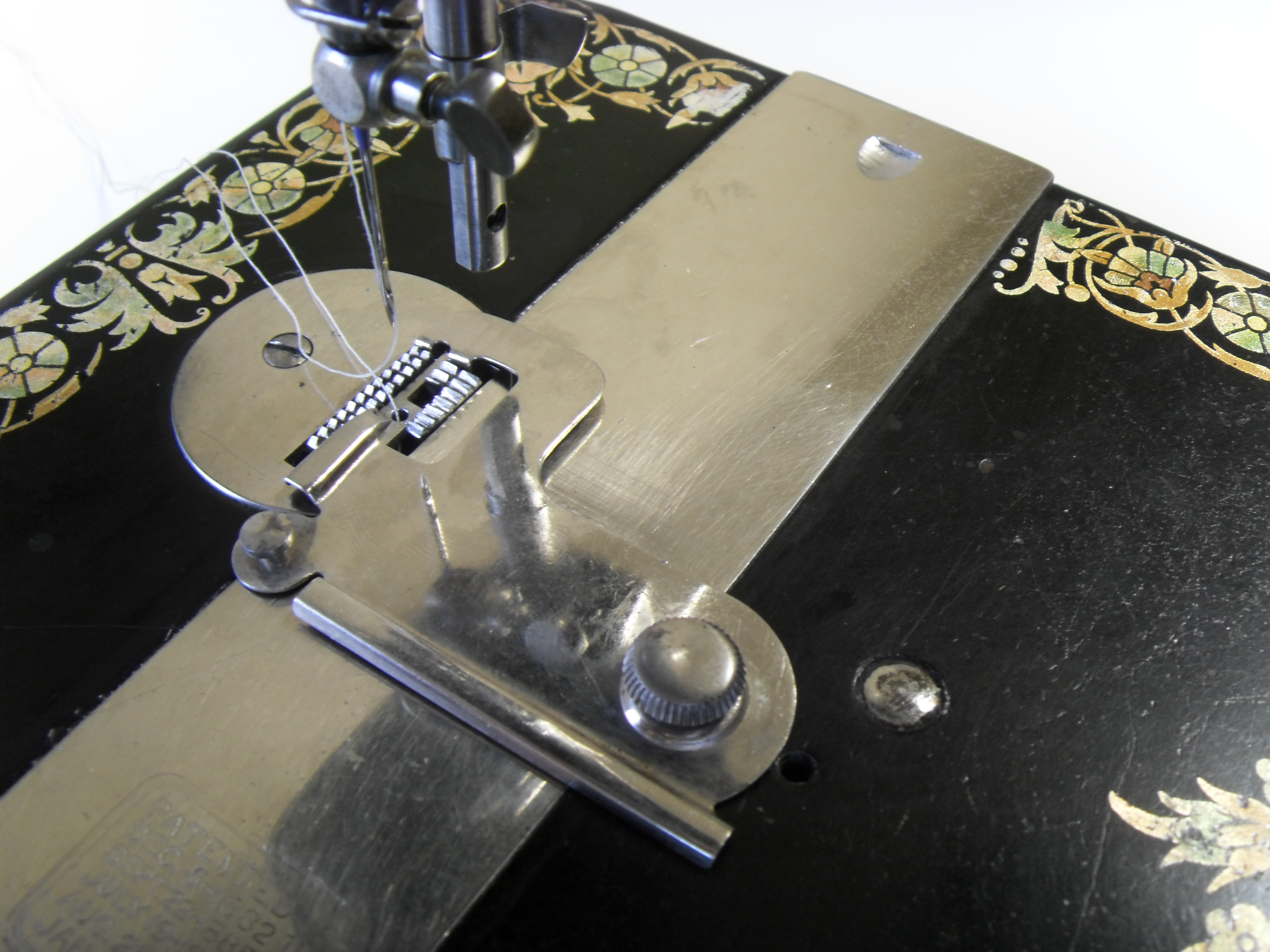
Underbraider

The accessories fit into a fold-out rectangular wooden box elegantly lined with velvet. Each accessory has its own particular niche in the box, such that they will all fit together into the small space of the folded-up box. The box was invented in 1888 by John M. Griest, a Singer employee who was awarded a US patent for the design.
