= Cut (clothing) =

Style or shape of a garment, and the way its structure hangs on the body

Cut in clothing, sewing and tailoring, is the style or shape of a garment as opposed to its fabric or trimmings.

The cut of a coat refers to the way the garment hangs on the body based on the shape of the fabric pieces used to construct it, the position of the fabric's grain line, and so on.

== See also ==
- Ease (sewing)
- Pattern (sewing)
- Clothing terminology
