= Ease (sewing) =

Amount of room a garment allows the wearer beyond the measurements of their body

In sewing and patternmaking, ease is the amount of room a garment allows the wearer beyond the measurements of their body. There are two types of ease, wearing ease and design ease. Wearing ease is the amount of room added so that one can engage in daily activities, such as sitting or moving. According to one source, wearing ease is 2 1/2" at the bust, 1" as the waist, and 3" at the hip. A second source notes that ready to wear ease is 2" at the bust, 1" at the waist, and 2" through the hips. Design, or fashion, ease is connected with a designer creating a particular look, and extends beyond wearing ease. The amount of ease allowance leads to specific categories: close-fitting, fitted, semi-fitted, loose-fitting, and very loose-fitting.

Clothing worn during the day tends to need more ease than evening garments, because of the range of activities that might take place. For evening garments, the activity determines how much ease will be needed.

Ease is most important for woven garments cut on the straight or crossgrain, because fabric in this orientation has little or no stretch. This is in contrast to woven garments cut on the bias and knit garments, both of which can stretch to accommodate movement.

The goal is for garments to fit smoothly, regardless of the amount of ease. The lengthwise grain of the fabric should be perpendicular to the floor, while the cross grain should be parallel to the floor.

A sloper pattern or block pattern is a simple pattern with very little or no ease made for the purpose of fitting the body accurately, from which more finished or stylized patterns may be developed.

== Adding ease ==
Several techniques can be used to add ease to a pattern. The simplest may be to add width to the pattern pieces, such as at the side seams. Pleats or gathers may also be used. Reducing the intake of darts will also add ease.

== Contouring ==
Contouring is the process of fitting a pattern to the body more nearly than the sloper, but it is not the same as removing ease. Contouring removes extra space within the measurements of the wearer. For example, a dress sloper will span the bust points, but a more fitted or 'contoured' bodice may dip toward the breastbone in between the breasts and fit each breast more closely, possibly even supporting each with boning. Contouring techniques can also be applied to other concave parts of the body which may be spanned by the sloper, such as the underside of the buttocks, or the knee area for pants.

== See also ==
- Cut
- Slim-fit pants
- Bell-bottoms
- Hip-huggers
- Phat pants
- Tube top
- Wide-leg jeans
