= HMS Virago =

Four ships of the Royal Navy have borne the name HMS Virago, after the term virago, to mean a strong, warlike woman:

- HMS Virago (1805) was a 12-gun gun-brig launched in 1805 and sold in 1816.
- HMS Virago (1842) was a wooden paddle sloop launched in 1842 and broken up in 1875.
- HMS Virago (1895) was a Quail-class torpedo boat destroyer launched in 1895, reclassified as a B-class destroyer in 1913 and sold in 1919.
- HMS Virago (R75) was a V-class destroyer launched in 1943. She was converted into a Type 15 frigate between 1951 and 1952, and was scrapped in 1965.
