= Gather (sewing) =

Sewing technique

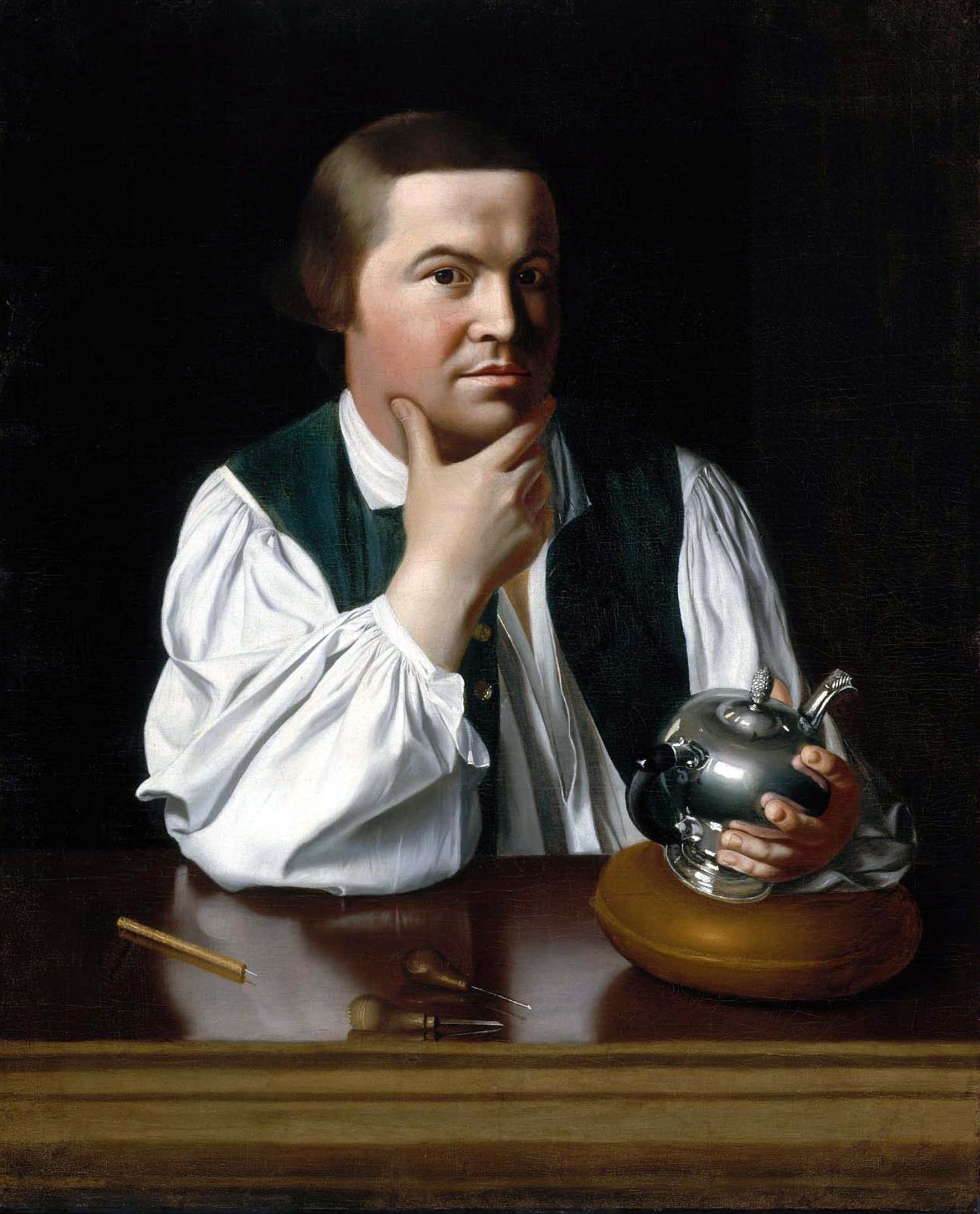
Paul Revere in a shirt gathered at shoulder and cuffs, 1776.

Gathering turns the edge of a piece of fabric into a bunch of small folds that are held together by a thread close to the edge. Gathering makes the fabric shorter where it is stitched. The whole of the fabric flares out into irregular, rolling folds beyond the gathered stitching. Gathering can be done by hand, with a machine, automatically, with elastic, or through channels.

Pleating and shirring are two different types of gather sewing.

In simple gathering, parallel rows of running stitches are sewn along one edge of the fabric to be gathered. The stitching threads are then pulled or "drawn up" so that the fabric forms small folds along the threads.

Gathering seams once involved tedious hand sewing of basting, which was time-consuming, especially with heavy fabric. However, finer gathers could be achieved. Now, a quick and easy way to make a gather is to use a wide zigzag stitch with a sewing machine. Both the upper and lower thread are pulled long and placed in front of the sewing machine. Then zigzagging is carefully sewn over the two threads without catching the threads in the process. Finally, the upper and lower threads are pulled to gather the fabric.

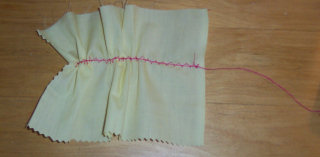
This photo shows a quick and easy method of machine gathering. This zigzag gathering technique is the strongest and most sturdy method of gathering.

== Types ==
- Pleating or plaiting is a type of gathering in which the folds are usually larger, made by hand and pinned in place, rather than drawn up on threads; however, very small pleats are often identical to evenly spaced gathers. Pleating is mainly used to make skirts, but can have other uses. (See main article Pleat.)
- Shirring or gauging is a decorative technique in which a panel of fabric is gathered with many rows of stitching across its entire length and then attached to a foundation or lining to hold the gathers in place. It is very commonly used to make larger pieces of clothing with some shape to them.

== Gallery ==
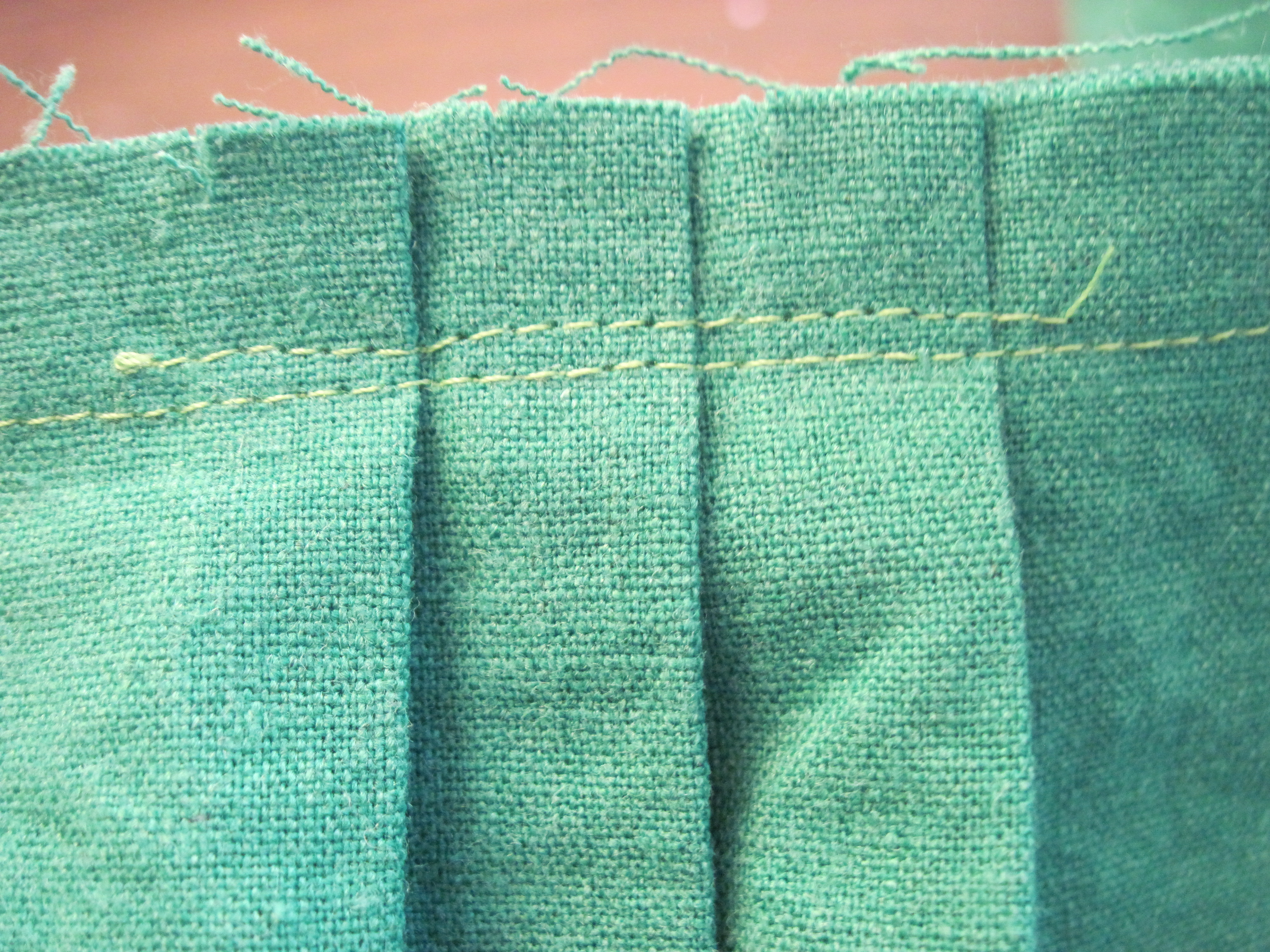
Pleated fabric

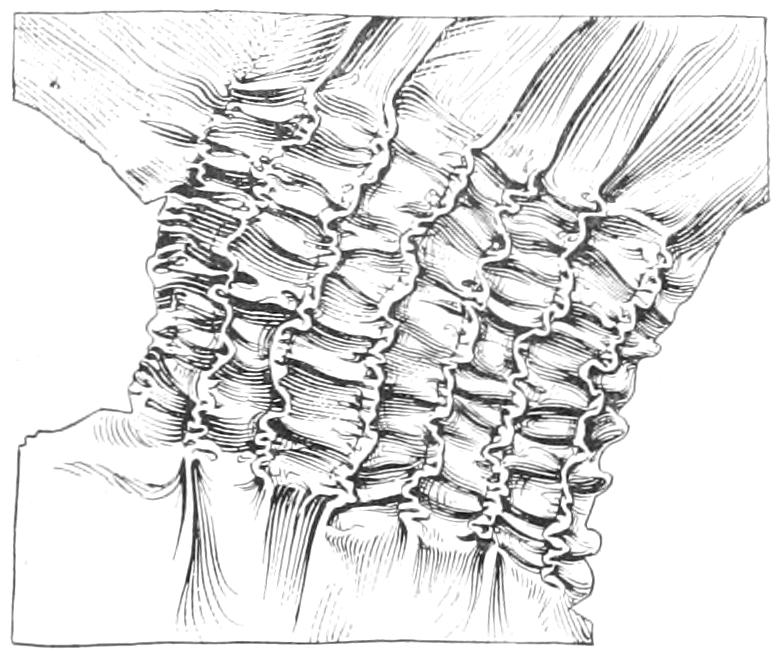
An illustration of shirred fabric.
