= Fabric treatment =

Processes that enhance fabric

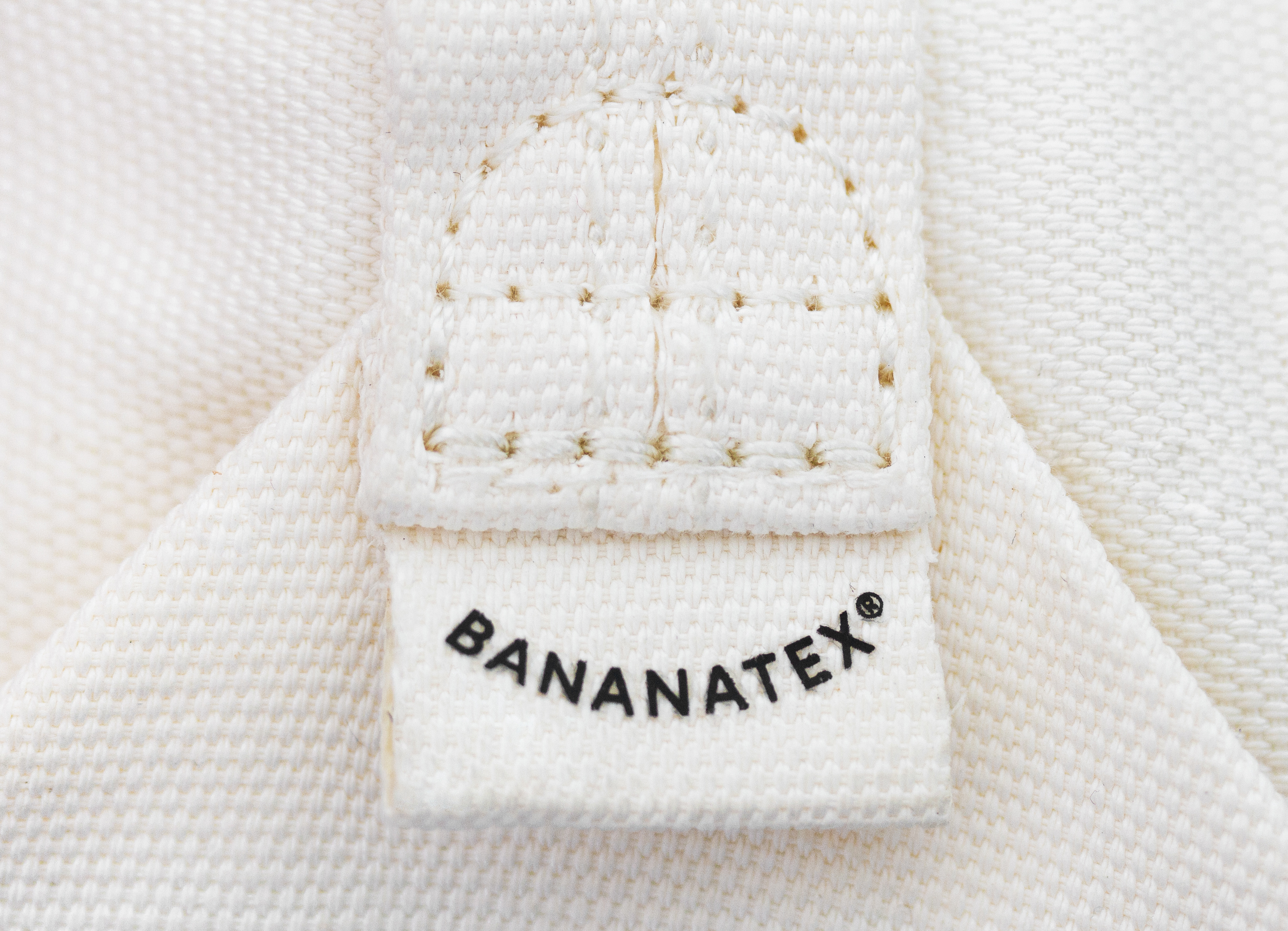
Fabric

Fabric treatments are processes that make fabric softer, or water resistant, or enhance dye penetration after they are woven. Fabric treatments get applied when the textile itself cannot add other properties. Treatments include, scrim, foam lamination, fabric protector or stain repellent, anti microbial and flame retardant.

Different materials and chemical processes are needed for different purposes of fabric treatments. Alongside the materials and chemical process, known as treatment agents, are the treatment devices that work with them t t.

The basic idea of fabric treatment is that making the fabric both softened and anti-static, which maintains clothes in a better condition.

== Materials ==
For linen, there are two ways to clean them, dry cleaned or machine washable depends on the garments. For machine washable linen, it is needed to be washed in cool water and used steam at a hot iron setting and iron from the inside out. It is needed to be air-dried.

For polyester, it is machine washable by using both cool water or warm water. Polyester is needed to be tumble dried and ironed by using low heat to otherwise it will melt or wrinkles marks will be on the fabric.

For silk, it needs to be washed by hand with cool warm water. Products without conditioning additives, such as wax and oil, mild baby shampoo are preferred. Silk cannot be tumble-dried. Iron can be used at a warm temperature. To dry out the silk, roll it in a towel and press the water out and hang it.

For acetate, hand washes it with cold water. It can be ironed with low heat temperature and a press cloth.

For cotton, it can be washed in either hot, warm, or cold water, depends on the colour of the fabric and the care instructions, in washing machines. It can be tumble-dried at a warm temperature.

For spandex, it can be washed by hands or machines, with cool or warm water. It cannot be dried at hot temperature and can only be ironed with a warm iron quickly.

For wool, it can be washed by hands or machines in cold water.

Products that contain disallow dimethyl ammonium chloride are sold in many countries for softening purposes. The products are used in matched with a technique. The technique is used in the rinsing cycle of the washing process. The ammonium salts is made up with alkyl, hydroxyalkyl, carbon atoms, benzyl group, water-soluble anoin. The anion that include, chloride, bromide, iodide, sulphate and methyl sulphate. The compound that uses for softening, contains tallow fatty acid, which reacts with dimethylamine to form dimethylamino propanol. The compound is esterified with hardened rapeseed oil fatty.

Outerwear fabrics consist hydrophobic synthetic fibers, which provide the purpose of protecting the materials from water and oil. Different degrees of resistance to abrasion, laundering and dry cleaning lead to various levels of the durability of the outerwear fabrics. Outerwear that is made completely of hydrophobic synthetic fiber are based on polyamides, such as nylon, and polyleneglycol terephthalate. Other materials that are made of 100% synthetic fibers, include upholstery and carpet fabrics. The purpose of using synthetic fibers is to make the product water durable and oil repellent.

== Devices ==
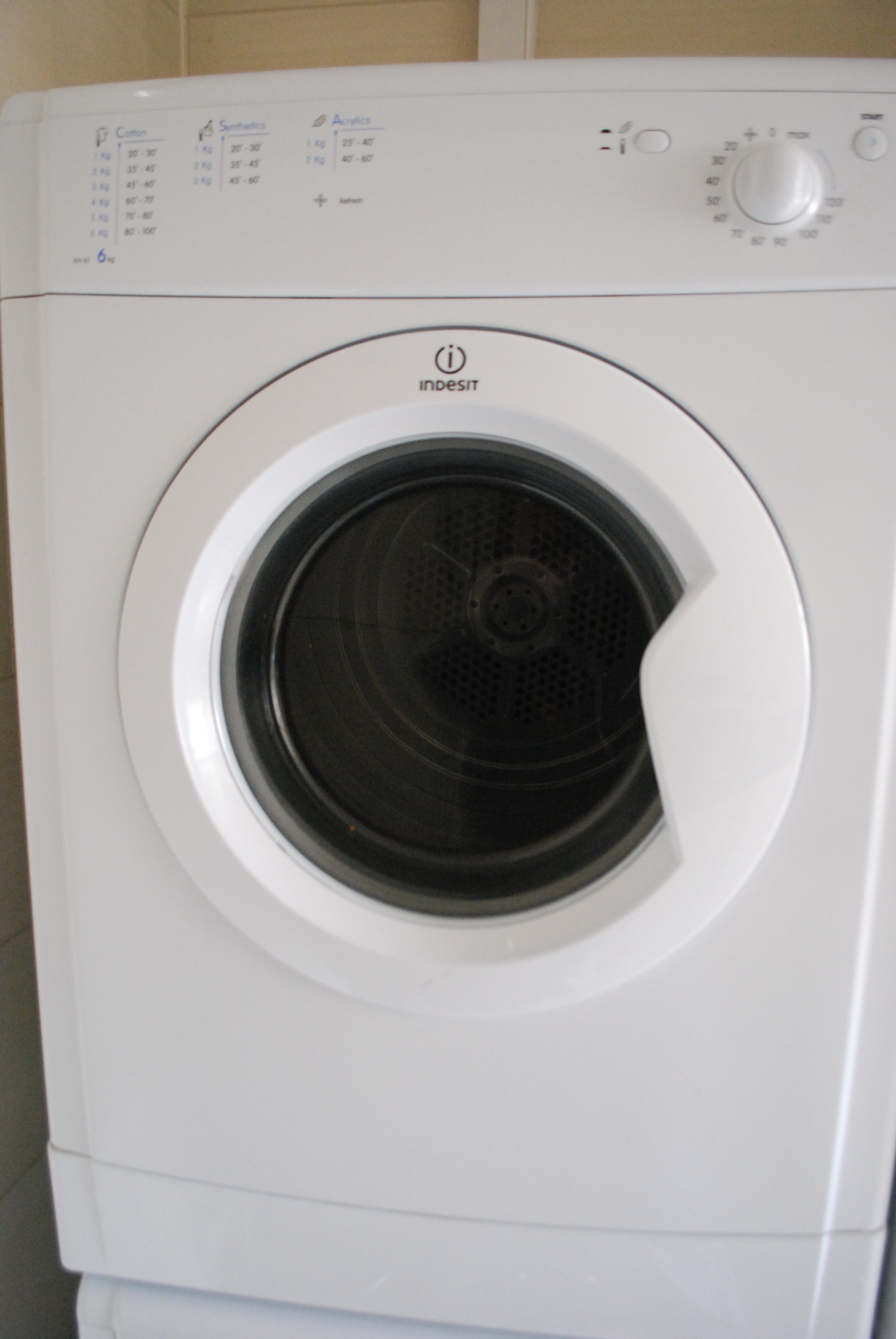
Tumble dryer

Clothing treatment device is used for avoiding distinctive smell re-soaping up to the fabrics. It contains a bag body for accommodating the fabrics, an ozone generator and a blowing fan for the flow of the air. The ozone generator and the blowing fan can be controlled by the control panel for appropriate performance.

The treatment tank is used for cloth treatment, such as washing in water, scouring and dyeing. A front chamber and a rear chamber are placed in the treatment tank, together with a cylindrical rotary. The cylindrical rotary can rotate in forward and reverse directions, which can apply the treatment to the fabric.

A tumble dryer is a machine that allows materials or chemical agents to soften the fabrics during the treatment process. A reservoir is comprised in the tumble dryer and that can be used for storing fabric treatment compositions. Then the fabric treatment composition will be exposed from the reservoir directly to the fabrics in the tumble dryer during the rumble drying cycle. Tumble dryers are reusable and attach a door. The co-mingling of the fabrics is separated from the substrates after the completion of the drying process. Stains will be on the fabrics when the fabrics are unevenly distributed, which is the disadvantage of using the tumble dryer. A reservoir for storing a fabric treatment composition is a device that the tumble dryer provides for different drying cycles.

The nebulizer system is used in fabric treatment devices. For general use for clothes cleaning, typical household washing machines and dryer are used. These devices can help to remove the water-soluble stains and light particulates. The nebulizer is installed inside the fabric treatment devices with a chamber. The chamber is separated into two sections, one stores all the particulates that removed and the other one is for the fluid removal system.

== Composition ==
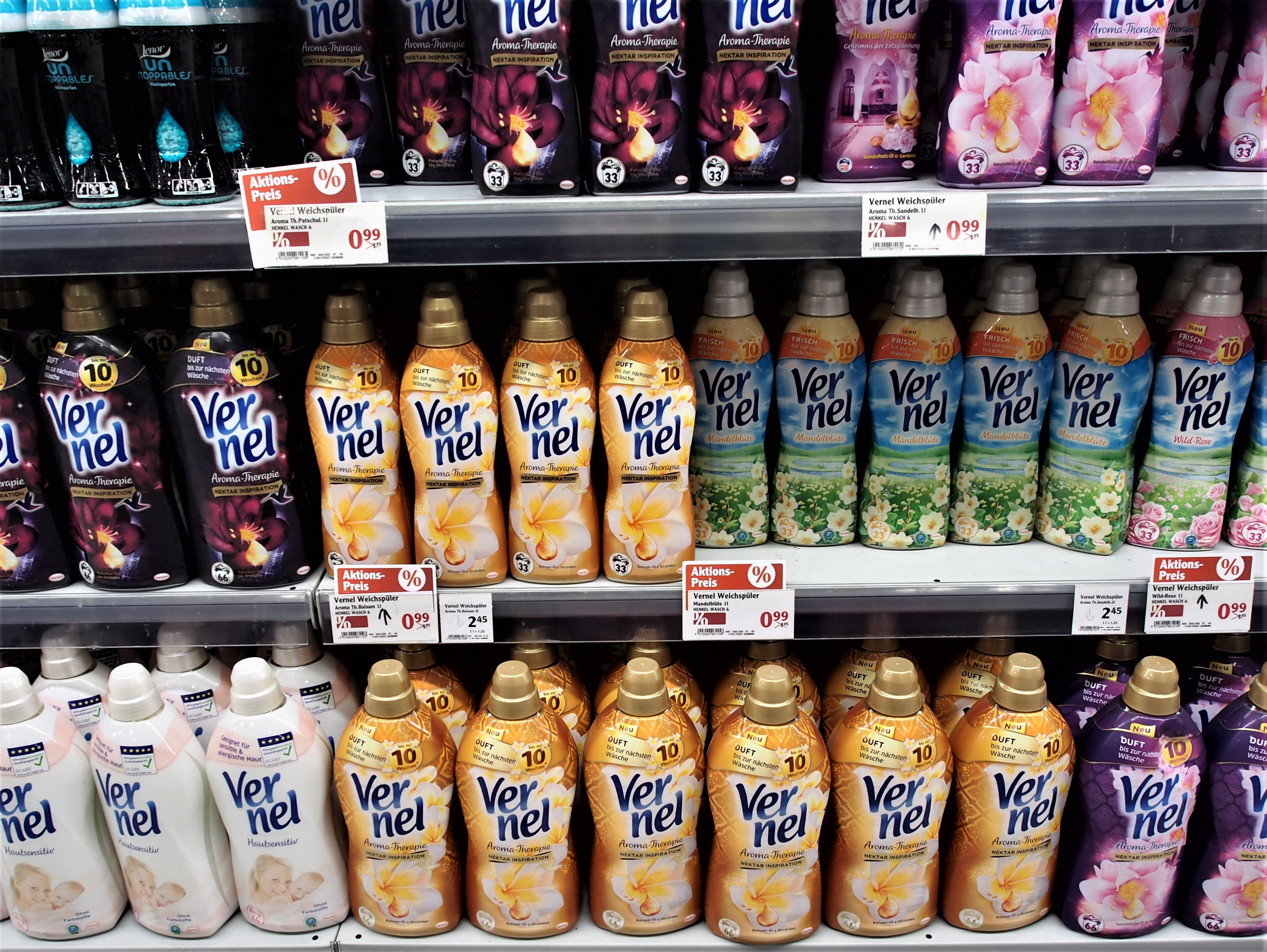
Softener

Cationic softener is a fabric softening composition, which include fatty alkyl sorbitan ester component. The fabric softening composition work effectively under the temperature at around 50 to 100 degree Celsius.

Permethrin is used to kill black flies, ticks, and mosquitoes by spraying it on the fabrics. This has no negative effects on human beings during proper usage and it lasts for 4 to 6 washings after spraying.

Texture improving composition includes dimethyl silicone or modified silicone emulsified with various emulsifiers, they are oil in water emulsions. It is used for improving fabrics' tactile qualities, cutting properties and sewability.

Silicone water repellents is used to yield fabrics. The purpose is to soften the fabrics and make them water repellent. The treated fabrics can be used to make clothes, raincoats and umbrellas.

Textile treatment agents can be used in woven and non-woven fabric to avoid thread breakage.

Soil release and water absorbency improving agents are used to enhance the soil-release properties and water absorbency of fabrics. These compositions can also improve the softness and smoothness of fabrics.

Optional softener composition components can be added in the combination of cationic or sorbitan ester softening compositions, that include perfumes, brightening agents, shrinkage controllers and spotting agents. Preferred liquid carriers include isopropyl alcohol or water mixtures, they are evaporative under room temperature. Methanol, ethanol, acetone, ethylene glycol, propylene glycol and alcohol ethoxylate nonionic surfactants are used as carriers for the softening compositions of the dryer dispensing. Anti-creasing agents, finishing agents, fumigants, lubricants, fungicides and sizing agents can be added in the softener composition. The additive optional composition components should be weighted between 0.01% to 10% of the total mix of softening composition.

The dispersing agent is effective in the release of the solvent and softening or treatment agent on the fabric articles. No visible dispersing agent residue will not be left on the fabric.

A fabric modifier or fabric treatment sheet can replace the fabric softening agent. Fabric modifier is made up of a selection of the group that consists of anti-creasing agents, anti-soil agents, anti-static agents, bacteriostatic agents, brightening agents, bodying agents, dyes, odor masking agents, fragrances, fiber emollients, finishing agents, germicides, lubricants, mildew or mothproofing agents, shrinkage controllers, sizing agents, a starch composition, a water repellent composition and a composition for conferring spot resistance.

== Formula ==
By using alkali, mix the synthetic detergent and sodium carbonate and heat it up to 50 to 60 degrees Celsius. Then wash the fabrics in plain warm water and rinse.

By using acid, mix the synthetic detergent and oxalic aside, and wash in plain warm water and rinse.

By using an organic solvent, apply toluene or industrial gasoline on the fabrics, then wash them.

The formulation of fabric treatment composition is that in a 1.5 litre beaker, 219.8 g in distilled water, 287.9 ml is polyethylene glycol, 100 ml is 2-ethanol and the mixture is heated to 85 degrees Celsius. 120 ml of sodium stearate is added during the heating process. Stir the mixture until all components are in solutions. 21 g of cocamide is added before 14 g of melted oleth-20 is added into the beaker. After 5 minutes, 143.4 g of quaternium-27 and 13.6 g of melted bentonite are added and dispersed, followed by 15 g of Korthix H. 15 g of fragrance can be added to the mixture and stir for 15 minutes.

The fabric treatment formulation is in a gelled or thickened liquid form. Four compulsory ingredients, that include, a dispersing agent, a liquid vehicle that consist of water, a fabric treatment agent, a surfactant.

The quaternary amines is used in the fabric treatment formulation of cationic softening or conditioning agents. The quaternary amines are used to condition the dried fabrics and to reduce static cling and lint.

Anti-creasing agents consist of corn starch and polyvinyl acetate.

Anti-soil agents consist of polyacrylic polyvinyl alcohol compositions.

Anti-static agents consist of nonionic and anionic surfactants, cationic amine surfactants and aluminium oxide and stearate.

Bacteriostatic agents consist of alkyl dimethyl benzyl ammonium chloride and dodecyl trimethyl ammonium chloride.

Bodying agents consists of carboxymethyl cellulose, hydroxyethyl cellulose, starch and polyvinyl acetate.

Germicides consist of halogenated salicylanilides, hexachlorophene, neomycin sulfate and benzalkonium quaternary compounds.

Lubricants consist of polyoxyethylene sorbitan monolaurate and methyl oleate.

Mildew or mothproofing agents consist of dialkyl quaternary ammonium salts, for example distearyl dimethyl ammonium chloride.

Shrinkage controllers consist of caustic soda, which is used in mercerising strength, water-soluble resinous condensates, and glyoxal and sizing agents.

== Stain release ==
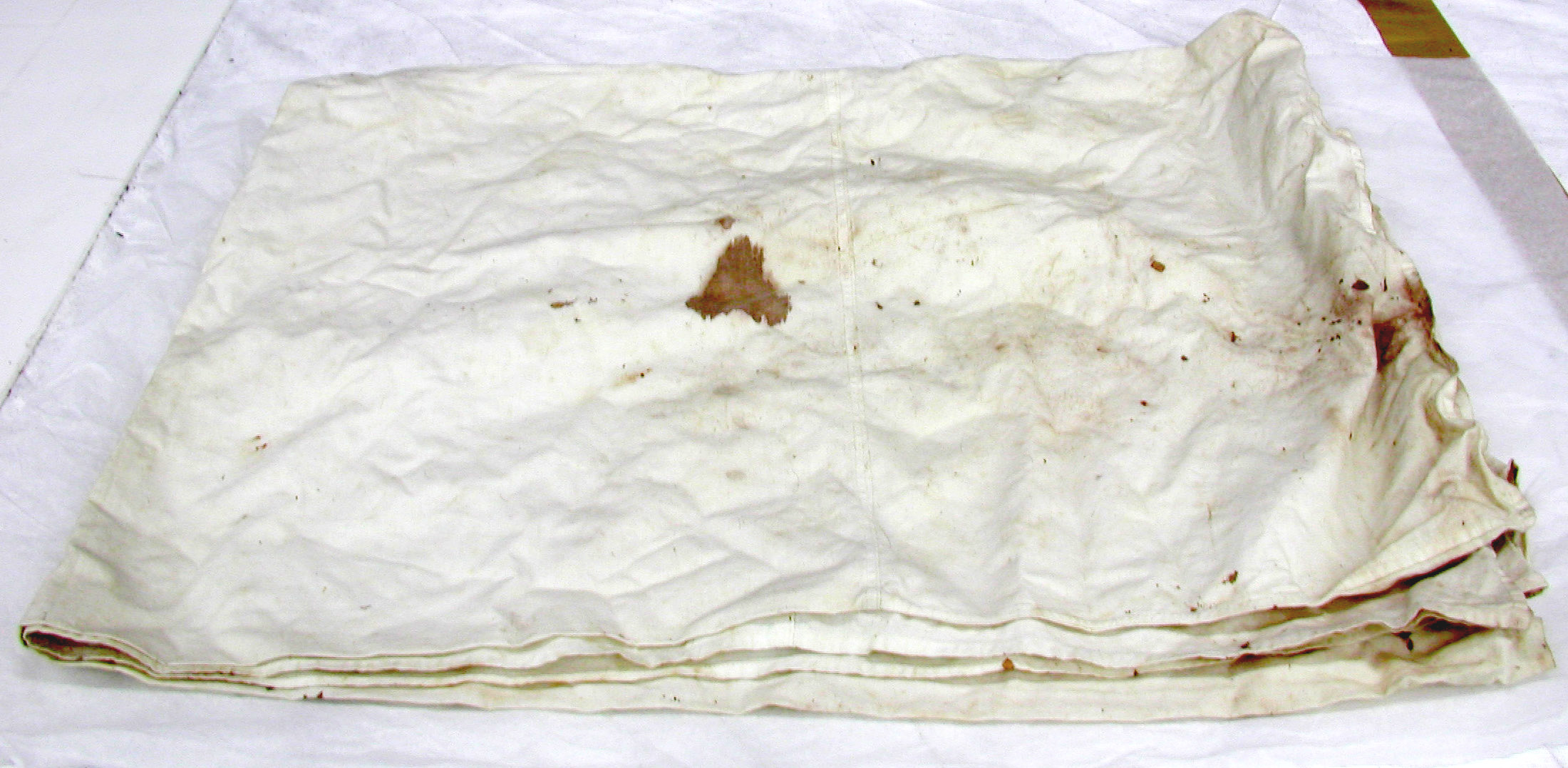
Stain on clothes

Fabric protection minimise the fiber wear, maintain fabric appearance by reducing fiber pilling, reduce colour loss, inhibiting the deposition of fugitive dyes onto the fabric during the washing process.

For a blood stain, soak the fabrics in cold water and wash it in the laundry if the stain is fresh. If the stains are dried, pretreat or soak in warm water with enzymes and wash it in the laundry.

For chocolate stain, pretreat or soak in warm water with enzymes or wash the stain with prewash stain remover then wash it in the laundry. Rewash the fabrics with bleach if the stain is still here after doing the previous steps.

For cosmetics in powder form, use brushes to brush off the powder and for the powder remains, pretreat with stain remover or liquid laundry detergent with hot water.

For grass stain, pretreat with stain remover or liquid laundry detergent with hot water or use the dilute white vinegar and flush with cold water.

For grease stain, soap the stain with the work liquid dish soap and a clean cloth. Then wash it with hot water.

For Ink stain, wash the stain with stain remover and wash it in the laundry. Apply alcohol on the stain surrounded area before using the solvent to the stain. Then wash it in the laundry and rinse it. Or apply a mixture of glycerin, white dishwashing detergent, water, and white vinegar to the stain. Then last for 30 minutes before rinsing it.

For juice stain, soak the fabrics in cold water for 30 minutes before applying white vinegar to the stain. After 30 minutes, wash it with bleach.

For lipstick and oil-based cosmetics, use mineral oil to blot the stain and last for 15 minutes, then sponge with the mixture of ammonia and water. Rinse it.

For nail polish, put some polish remover to the back of the stain and repeat this step until the stain lifts. Wash it in the laundry and rinse it.

For a red wine stain, apply the mixture of salt and stretch on the stain, and pour boiling water on it. Use the diluted white vinegar to remove the stain, if the stain remains. Wash it in the laundry with cold water.

For sauce stain, use the dilute white vinegar to remove the stain, then flush the stain with cold water. Prewash the fabrics with stain remover before washing them in the laundry with cold water.
