= Sleeve =

Part of clothing that covers the arms

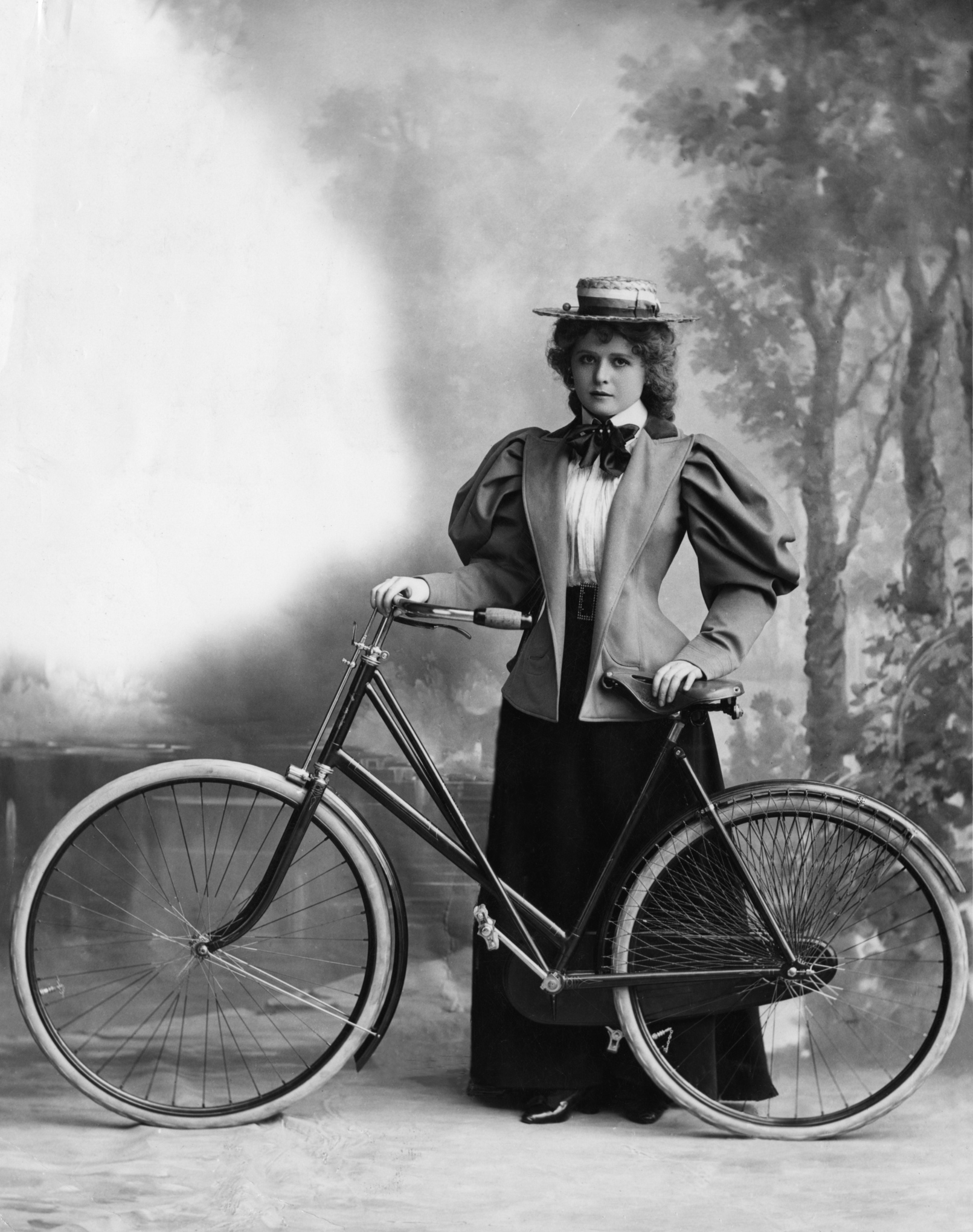
Actress Mabel Love in an outfit with leg-o'-mutton (gigot) sleeves in the 1890s

A sleeve (Old English: slīef, a word allied to slip, cf. Dutch sloof) is the part of a garment that covers the arm, or through which the arm passes or slips.

The sleeve is a characteristic of fashion seen in almost every country and time period, across a myriad of styles of dress. Styles vary from close-fitting to the arm, to relatively unfitted and wide sleeves, some with extremely wide cuffs. Long, hanging sleeves have been used variously as a type of pocket, from which the phrase "to have up one's sleeve" (to have something concealed ready to produce) comes. There are many other proverbial and metaphorical expressions associated with the sleeve, such as "to wear one's heart upon one's sleeve", and "to laugh in one's sleeve".

Early Western medieval sleeves were cut straight, and underarm triangle-shaped gussets were used to provide ease of movement. In the 14th century, the rounded sleeve cap was invented, allowing a more fitted sleeve to be inserted, with ease around the sleeve head and a wider cut at the back allowing for wider movement. Throughout the 19th century and particularly during the Victorian era in Western culture, the sleeves on women's dress at times became extremely wide, rounded or otherwise gathered and 'puffy', necessitating the need for sleeve supports worn inside a garment to support the shape of the sleeve. Various early styles of Western sleeve are still found in types of academic dress.

Sleeve length varies in modern times from barely over the shoulder (cap sleeve) to floor-length (as seen in the Japanese furisode). Most contemporary shirt sleeves end somewhere between the mid-upper arm and the wrist.

== History ==
=== Middle Ages ===
The medieval sleeve or set-in sleeve was unlike modern techniques. The seam for this type of sleeve was usually placed at the back of the arm, and fitted under the arm.

== Types of sleeves ==
Often the names applied to sleeves in historical costume are modern.

Type	Brief description	Image
1/4-length sleeve or quarter-length sleeve	A sleeve that extends from the shoulder to midway down the biceps and triceps area.	
3/4-length sleeve or three-quarter length sleeve	A sleeve that extends from the shoulder to a length midway between the elbow and the wrist. It was common in the United States in the 1950s and again in the 21st century.	
Angel sleeve	A long wide sleeve that usually hangs loose from the shoulder	
Batwing sleeve	A long sleeve with a deep armhole, tapering toward the wrist. Also known as a magyar sleeve.	
Bell sleeve	A long sleeve fitted from the shoulder to elbow and gently flared from elbow onward	
Bishop sleeve	A long sleeve, fuller at the bottom than the top, and gathered into a cuff	
Butterfly sleeve	Usually found on Filipiniana, the national costume for women of the Philippines, and dresses or formal blouses that start at the shoulder and get wider toward the end of the sleeve but usually do not go longer than 4–5 inches. The difference between a butterfly sleeve and a bell sleeve is that butterfly sleeves usually do not go completely around the full arm.	
Cap sleeve	A very short sleeve covering only the shoulder, not extending below armpit level, usually worn by women	
Cold shoulder sleeve	A long sleeve that is disconnected past the stitching on top of the shoulder, but not underneath, where the armpit is. The top of the biceps is exposed.	
Dolman sleeve	A long sleeve that is very wide at the top and narrow at the wrist	
Fitted point sleeve	A sleeve that is long and narrow and ends in a point resting against the back of the hand	
Gigot or leg-o'-mutton sleeve	A sleeve that is extremely wide over the upper arm and narrow from the elbow to the wrist; compare with juliet sleeves	
Hanging sleeve	A sleeve that opens down the side or front, or at the elbow, to allow the arm to pass through (14th, 15th, 16th, 17th centuries) Further information: Maunch	
Juliet sleeve	A long, tight sleeve with a puff at the top, inspired by fashions of the Italian Renaissance and named after Shakespeare's tragic heroine; popular from the Empire period through the 1820s in fashion, again in the late 1960s under the influence of Zeffirelli's film Romeo and Juliet; compare with gigot/leg-o'-mutton sleeves	
Kimono sleeve	A sleeve cut in one with the bodice in a wide sloping shape, similar to that on traditional Chinese robes (not Japanese kimono, whose sleeves are sewn separately)	
Lantern sleeve	Full, gathered sleeve where the top part of the sleeve is plain and the cuff balloons out halfway between wrist and elbow	
Long sleeve	Sleeve covering the entire arm from shoulder to wrist	
Pagoda sleeve	A wide, bell-shaped sleeve popular in the 1860s, worn over an engageante, or false undersleeve	
Paned sleeve	A sleeve made in panes, or panels, allowing a lining or shirt-sleeve to show through (16th and 17th centuries)	
petal or tulip sleeve	A sleeve that has one curved overlapping seam, resembling the petals of a tulip.	
Poet sleeve	A long sleeve fitted from shoulder to elbow and then flared (somewhat dramatically) from elbow to wrist (or sometimes mid-hand), often featuring ruffles on the cuffs	
Puffed or puff sleeve	A short, ¾ length or full sleeve that is gathered at the top and bottom, now most often seen on wedding and children's clothing	
Raglan sleeve	A sleeve that extends to the neckline allowing easier movement	
Set-in sleeve	A sleeve sewn into an armhole (armscye) – also known as a drop sleeve	
Short sleeve	A sleeve that is elbow-length or shorter	
Two-piece sleeve	A sleeve cut in two pieces, inner and outer, to allow the sleeve to take a slight L shape to accommodate the natural bend at the elbow without wrinkling; used in tailored garments	
Virago sleeve	A full "paned" or "pansied" sleeve gathered into two puffs by a ribbon or fabric band above the elbow, worn in the 1620s and 1630s	
Wizard's sleeve	A sleeve that extends from the shoulder to wrist expanding in a conical shape, draping openly off the wrist	

== See also ==
- Sleeveless shirt
