= Virago sleeve =

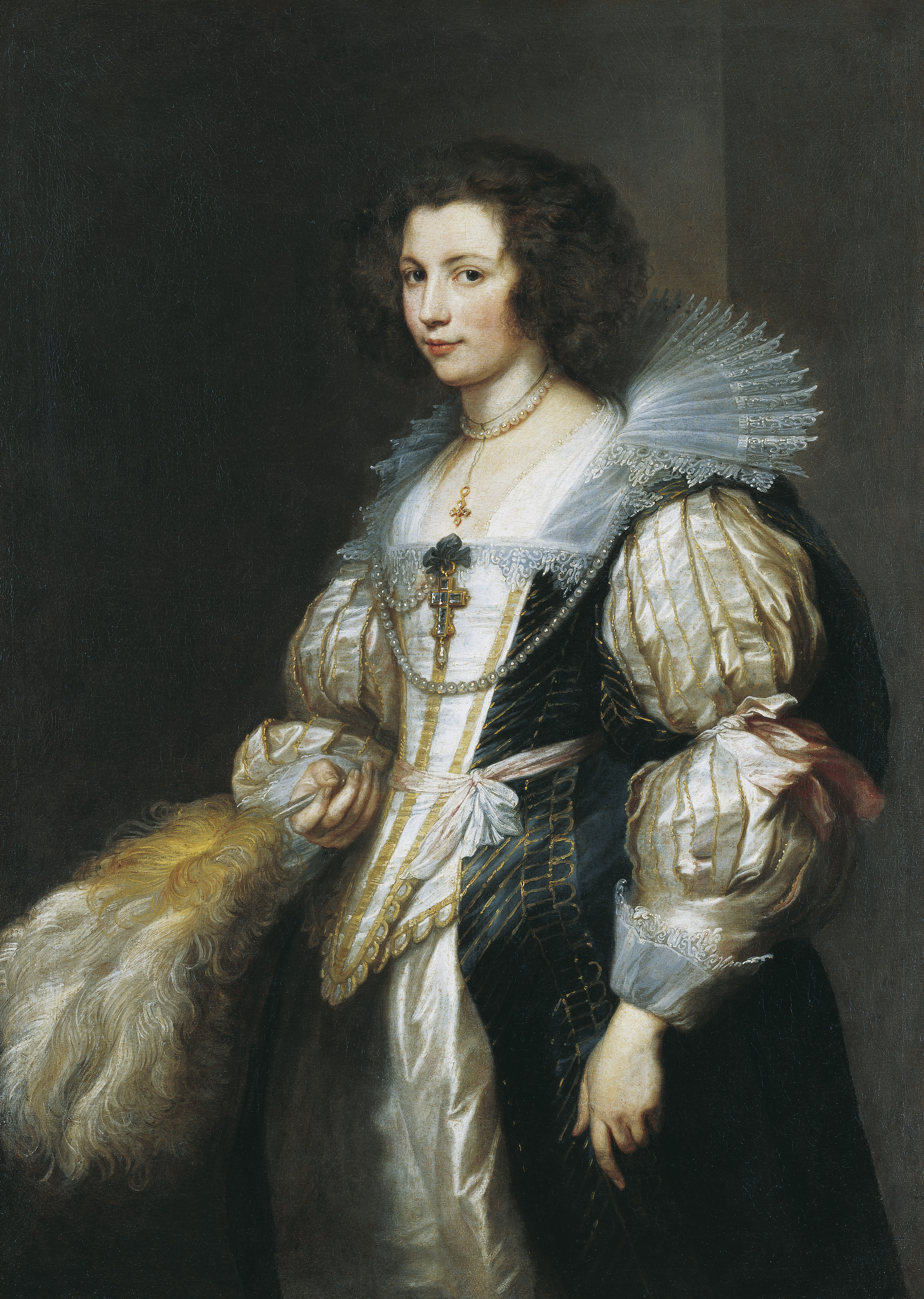
Portrait of Marie-Louise de Tassis by Van Dyck. White satin gown with virago sleeves tied with pink ribbon, worn under a black short-sleeved gown, c.1630.

A virago sleeve is a women's item of clothing fashionable in the 1620s–1630s. It is a full "paned" or "pansied" sleeve (that is, made of strips of fabric) gathered into two puffs by a ribbon or fabric band above the elbow.

== See also ==
- Sleeve
- 1600–1650 in fashion
- Virago
