= False singular =

Form of back-formation

In English grammar, a false singular occurs when a singular noun ending in a s or z sound is understood as a plural from which a new singular is constructed. The false singular is a form of back-formation.

Some false singulars become standard English. For example, pea was originally a false singular from pease pl. peasen. The old word remains in the phrase pease porridge.

The non-standard historical forms Chinee and Portuguee are also false singulars, from Chinese and Portuguese.
