= Shirring =

Gathering fabric with multiple rows of stitching

Shirring is a decorative sewing technique that involves stitching together many rows of gathered fabric. Shirring reduces the size of the original fabric while adding texture to the resulting decorative fabric.

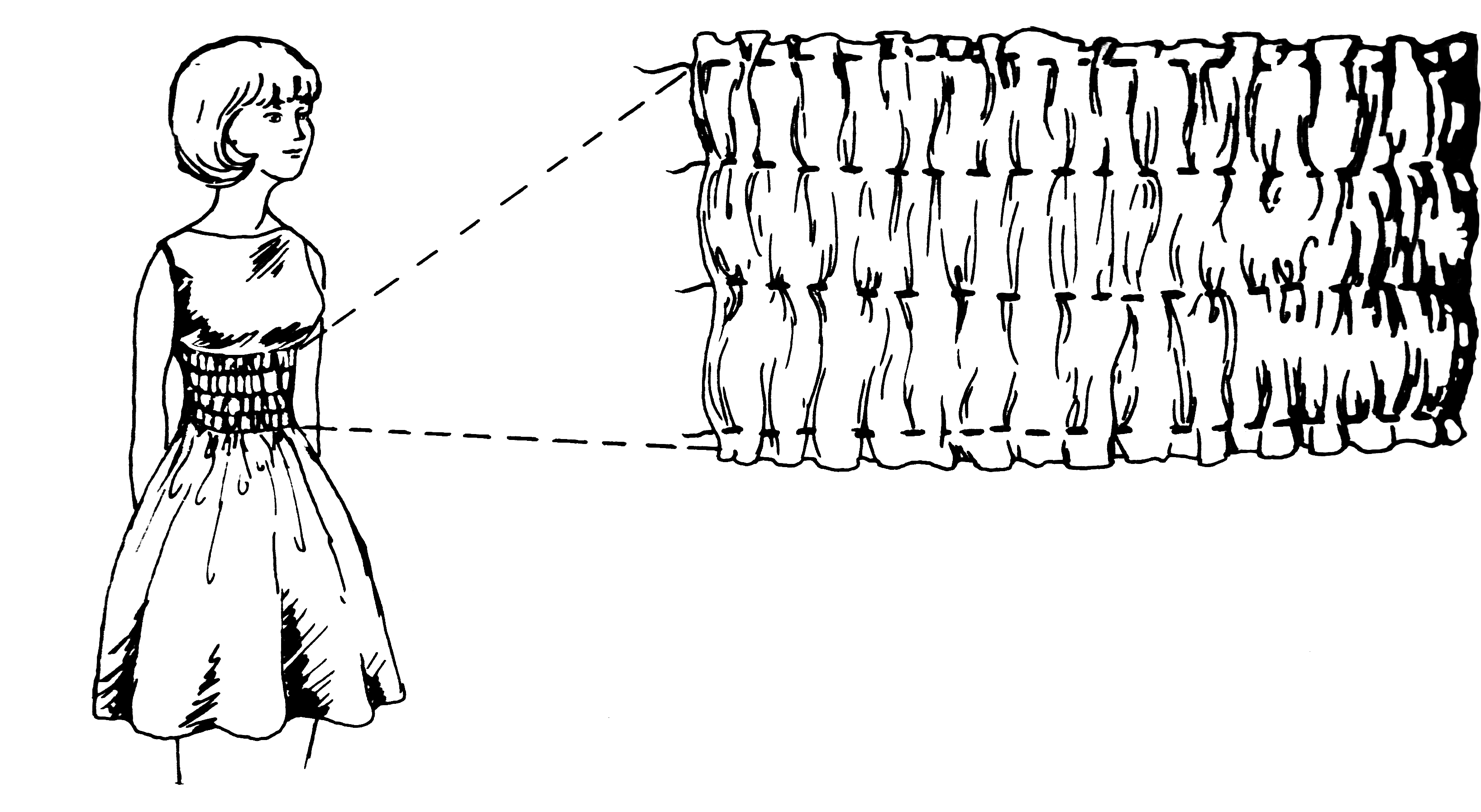
A close up of the shirr on the blouse

In sewing, shirring is two or more rows of gathers that are used to decorate parts of garments, usually the sleeves, bodice or yoke. The term is also sometimes used to refer to the pleats seen in stage curtains.

In the construction of digital 3D clothing shirring can be accomplished by applying a displacement map or normal map when rendering the digital clothing models in a render engine.

== See also ==
- Gather (sewing)
- Godet (sewing)
- Pleat
