= Virago =

Woman with masculine characteristics

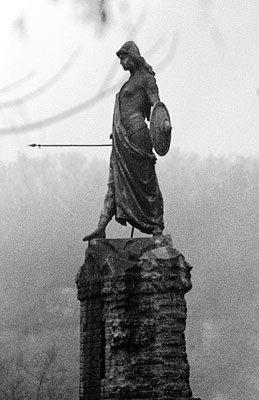
Bronze of a young female warrior in Lombard costume. Francesco Porzio, Monumento alla difesa di Casale, 1897

A virago is a woman who demonstrates abundant masculine virtues. The word comes from the Latin word virāgō (genitive virāginis) meaning "vigorous maiden" from vir meaning "man" or "man-like" (cf. virile and virtue) to which the suffix -āgō is added, a suffix that creates a new noun of the third declension with feminine grammatical gender. Historically, this was often positive and reflected heroism and exemplary qualities of masculinity. However, it could also be pejorative, indicating a woman who is masculine to the exclusion of traditional feminine virtues.

Modern use of the word virago generally takes the disparaging sense. Thus virago joined pejoratives such as termagant, mannish, amazonian and shrew to describe women who acted aggressively or like men. The word virago has almost always had an association with cultural gender transgression. There are recorded instances of viragos (such as Joan of Arc) fighting battles, wearing men's clothing, or receiving the tonsure.

== History ==
Historically, the concept of a virago reaches back into antiquity where Hellenistic philosophy asserted that elite and exceptionally heroic men had virtus (Greek: ἀνδρεία, romanized: andreia). Virtus (once again linked to vir, the brave man abiding by society's highest values and ethics as opposed to homo, human being) defined the traits of excellence for a man in ancient Rome (and Greece), including valor and heroism, but also morality and physical strength. Women and non-elite or unheroic men (slaves, servants, craftsmen, merchants) were considered a lesser category, and believed to be less excellent in Roman morality. A woman, however, if exceptional enough could earn the title virago. In doing so, she surpassed the expectations for what was believed possible for her gender, and embodied masculine-like aggression and/or excellence. Ovid, in his Metamorphoses (1st century CE), refers to the goddess Athena as flava [yellow-haired] virago. Virago, then, was a title of respect and admiration. In Christianity, a nun or holy woman who had become equal in divinity to male monks through practiced celibacy, exemplary religious practice and devotion, and intact virginity, was considered to have surpassed the limitations of her femaleness and was called virago. Latin writer Firmicus Maternus in the 4th century CE describes virago as women who take on a man's character and desire intercourse with women like men.

Standard modern dictionaries define virago as either, in order of definition, (1) a "loud overbearing woman"; a "shrew". or (2) a woman of "great stature, strength, and courage" Thus virago continues to be associated with both the naming of a woman who has either (1) a domineering, abrasive and spiteful manner, or (2) has risen above cultural and gender stereotypes to embody a virile heroism; for example, the British Royal Navy christened at least four warships Virago.

== Vulgate Bible ==
The Vulgate Bible, translated by Jerome and others in the 4th century AD, was an early Latin translation of the Hebrew Bible Old Testament. In Genesis 2:23, Jerome uses the words Vir for man and Virago for "woman" attempting to reproduce a pun on "male" and "female" (ish and ishah) that existed in the Hebrew text.

The Vulgate reads:

Dixitque Adam hoc nunc os ex ossibus meis et caro de carne mea haec vocabitur virago quoniam de viro sumpta est.
"And Adam said: This now is bone of my bones, and flesh of my flesh; she shall be called woman, because she was taken out of man."

The Middle English poem Cursor Mundi retains the Latin name for the woman in its otherwise Middle English account of the creation:

Quen sco was broght be-for adam, Virago he gaf her to nam; þar for hight sco virago, ffor maked of the man was sco. (lines 631–34)
"When she was brought before Adam, Virago was the name he gave to her; Therefore she is called Virago, For she was made out of the man."

== See also ==
- Amazons
- Shield-maiden
- Tomboy
- Woman warrior
- Virago sleeve

== Bibliography ==
- Ernst Breisach, Caterina Sforza; A Renaissance virago, Chicago [usw.]: University Press 1967
- Elizabeth D. Carney,"Olympias and the Image of the Virago" in: Phoenix, Vol. 47, No. 1 (Spring, 1993), pp. 29–55
- Morris, Richard. Cursor Mundi: A Northumbrian Poem of the XIV Century. London: Oxford UP, 1874. Republished 1961.
- Barbara Newman. From virile woman to womanChrist: studies in medieval religion and literature. University of Pennsylvania Press (January 1, 1995)
- Jane Tibbetts Schulenburg. Forgetful of their sex: female sanctity and society, ca. 500-1100. University Of Chicago Press (January 1, 2001)
- Yenna Wu, The Chinese virago : a literary theme, Cambridge, Mass. [u.a.] : Harvard Univ. Press, 1995.
- Schleiner, Winfried. ""Divina Virago": Queen Elizabeth as an Amazon." Studies in Philology 75, no. 2 (1978): 163–80. Accessed June 28, 2020. www.jstor.org/stable/4173965.
