= Armscye =

Armhole on a garment to which a sleeve is attached

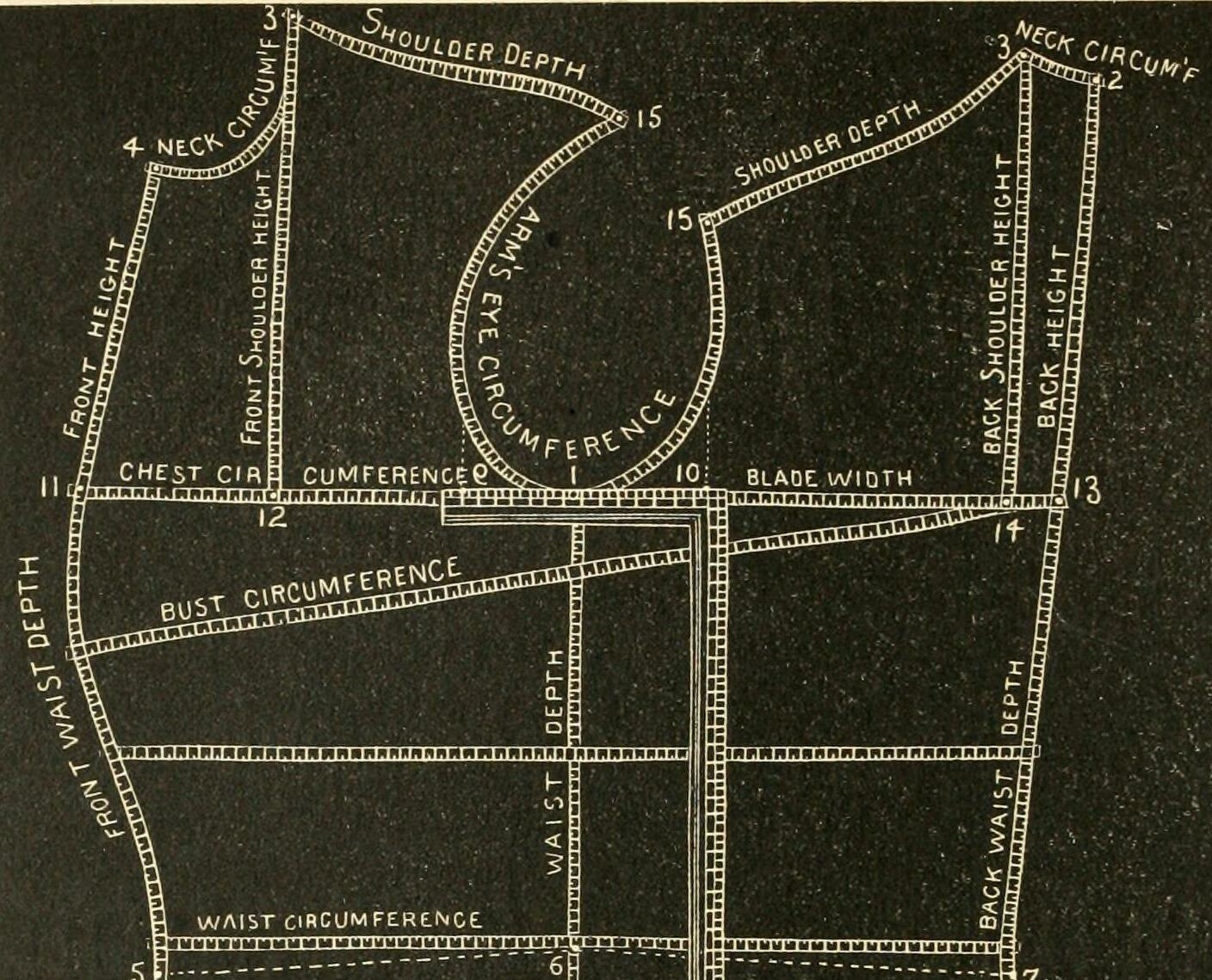
Sewing pattern featuring an Armscye

In sewing, the armscye is the armhole, the fabric edge to which the sleeve is sewn. The length of the armscye is the total length of this edge; the width is the distance across the hole at the widest point.

== Etymology ==
Multiple theories for the etymology of "armscye" have been proposed.

The scholarly etymology has the origin as "arm" + "scye." The first documented use of "scye" in print is by Jamieson (1825) Suppl.: "sey," a Scots and Ulster dialect word (written also scy, sci, si, sie, sy in glossaries) meaning ‘the opening of a gown, etc., into which the sleeve is inserted; the part of the dress between the armpit and the chest (of obscure etymology, and sometimes confused with "scythe" due to similarly curved shapes).

A more fanciful folk etymology is as follows. Because the expression "arm's eye" was used in some older sewing texts (e.g. "Gynametry," published in 1887) it is conjectured that in poor prints the apostrophe and the crossbar of the lower case "e" were indistinct, and the neologism "armscye" was created by readers who concatenated the orphaned fragments "arm" and "s" with the corrupt "cye". According to this undocumented theory, until the beginning of the 20th century writers favoured the original term or at least a more logical variation (e.g. "armeye" in The Perfect Dressmaking System, published in 1914), but as self-proclaimed experts copied each other, the term "armscye" eventually became widely enough used by home sewers to gain general acceptance.

The latter theory is clearly contradicted by evidence (discussed above) that the term "scye" was already in use at least as early as 1825. Therefore, the erroneous folk analysis was not in the direction from "arm's eye" to "armcye", but rather from the original "armcye" to "arm's eye" (which made more sense to modern English speakers, with a later adjustment more recently back to the correct "armscye").

== See also ==
- Dolman
