= Pick =

Pick may refer to:

== Places ==
- Pick City, North Dakota, a town in the United States
- Pick Lake (Cochrane District, Ontario), a lake in Canada
- Pick Lake (Thunder Bay District), a lake in Canada
- Pick Mere, a lake in Pickmere, England

== People with the name ==
- Pick (surname), a list of people with this name
- nickname of Percy Charles Pickard (1915–1944), British Royal Air Force pilot
- Pick Temple (1911–1991), American folk singer and children's television star
- Pick Withers (born 1948), drummer for the English rock band Dire Straits

== Arts, entertainment, and media ==
- Plectrum or pick, a device for strumming a stringed instrument

- Guitar pick, specific to guitars and similar instruments

- The Picks, a vocal quartet which backed Buddy Holly and the Crickets in 1957
- Pick (TV channel), a British television channel
- "The Pick", an episode of the television show Seinfeld
- Odds and evens or pick, a hand game
- Pick (film), short drama film, directed by Alicia K. Harris

== Science, mathematics and technology ==
- Pick operating system, a computer operating system
- Pick's disease, a neurodegenerative disease
- Pick's theorem in geometry
- Sertoli cell nodule, also known as Pick's adenoma, a medical disorder

== Sports ==
- Pick, slang term for an interception
  - Pick-six, a gridiron football term for turning an interception into a touchdown
- Draft (sports) pick, the right to choose a player, or the player chosen
- Screen (sports), also called a pick, a blocking move used against a defender

== Tools and weapons ==
- Afro pick, a type of comb for kinky, coiled hair
- Hook and pick, a hand tool for removing seals, especially gaskets. Typically awl shaped and bent at the tip for more leverage.
- Horseman's pick, a weapon used by medieval cavalry units in Europe
- Ice pick
- Lockpick (disambiguation), a tool used for lock picking
- Pickaxe, a hand tool
- Toothpick

== Other uses ==
- Pick (hieroglyph), an ancient Egyptian symbol representing the tool
- Party of Independent Candidates of Kenya (or PICK), a political party in Kenya
- Pick stitch, in sewing
- Pick Szeged, a Hungarian meat company

== See also ==
- Pix (disambiguation)
- Pique (disambiguation)
- Pic (disambiguation)
