= Pick Lake =

Pick Lake may refer to:

- Pick Lake (Cochrane District, Ontario), Canada
- Pick Lake (Thunder Bay District, Ontario)

== See also ==
- Toothpick Lake, Ontario, Canada
