= Choose =

Choose may refer to:

- Choice, the act of judging the merits of multiple options and selecting one of them for action
- Combination, a mathematical function describing the number of possible selections of subsets ("seven choose two")
- Morra, a hand game sometimes referred to as Choose
- Choose (film), a crime horror film directed by Marcus Graves
- "Choose" (Color Me Badd song), from the 1993 album Time and Chance
- "Choose", song by David Guetta featuring Ne-Yo and Kelly Rowland from One Love, 2009
- "Choose", song by Stone Sour from the album Stone Sour
- ""Choose" (Why Don't We song), from the 2018 album 8 Letters
- "Choose", song performed by Matt Monro for the United Kingdom in the Eurovision Song Contest 1964

== See also ==
- Pick (disambiguation)
