= Hem =

Garment finishing method

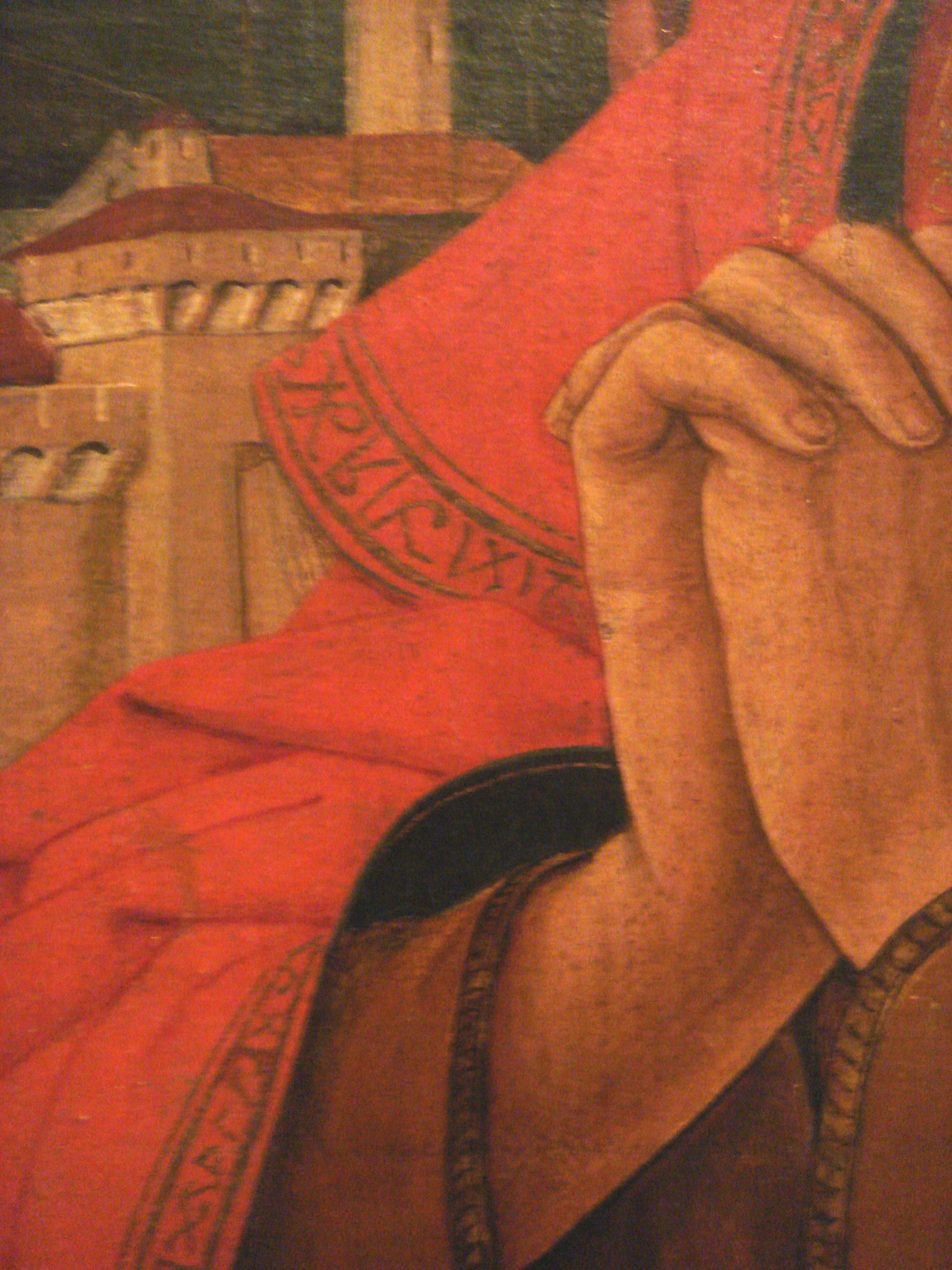
Hem detail with inscriptions (Saint-John in Crucifixion, Vicino da Ferrara, 1469–70)

In sewing, a hem is a garment finishing method in which the edge of a piece of cloth is folded and sewn to prevent unravelling of the fabric and adjust the length of the piece in garments, such as at the end of the sleeve or the bottom of the garment.

== Methods ==
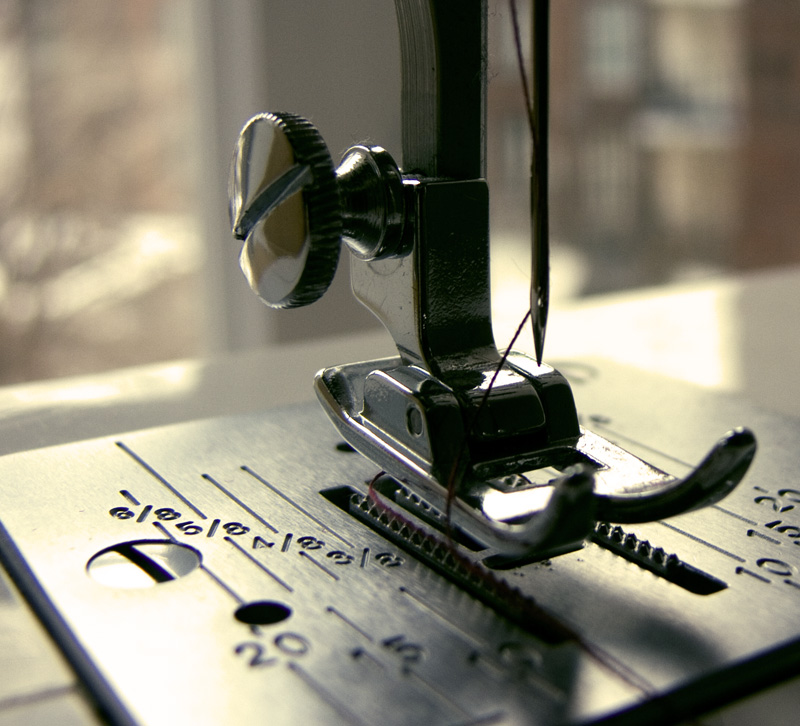
A presser foot on a home sewing machine includes measurement markings on the plate beneath the foot for easier hemming. Shown are measurements in fractions of an inch (above) and in millimetres (below).

There are many different styles of hems of varying complexities. The most common hem folds up a cut edge, folds it up again, and then sew it down. The style of hemming thus completely encloses the cut edge in cloth, so that it cannot unravel. Other hem styles use fewer folds. One of the simplest hems encloses the edge of cloth with a stitch without any folds at all, using a method called an overcast stitch, although an overcast stitch may be used to finish a folded "plain hem" as well.

There are even hems that do not call for sewing, instead using iron-on materials, netting, plastic clips, or other fasteners. These threadless hems are not common, and are often used only on a temporary basis.

The hem may be sewn down with a line of invisible stitches or blind stitch, or sewn down by a sewing machine. The term hem is also extended to other cloth treatments that prevent unraveling. Hems can be serged (see serger), hand rolled and then sewn down with tiny stitches (still seen as a high-class finish to handkerchiefs), pinked with pinking shears, piped, covered with binding (this is known as a Hong Kong finish), or made with many other inventive treatments.

Most haute couture hems are sewn by hand. Decorative embroidery embellishment is sometimes referred to as a hem-stitch design.

== Types of hems and hem stitches ==
A variety of hem types exist because there are so many different fabric types and garment styles. Common types of hems include:

- Double-folded hem
- Overlocked and folded hem
- Rolled hem
- Bias tape hem
- Blind hem

Hems of different depths (which includes the seam allowance) may have a particular style to achieve, which requires more or less fabric depending upon the style. A handkerchief-style edge requires a hem allowance of 0.6 centimetres (0.24 in). A typical skirt or pant hem may be 5–7.6 cm (2.0–3.0 in). The hem's depth affects the way the fabric of the finished fabric will drape. Heavier fabric requires a relatively shorter hem. An interface fabric sewn to the fabric in the hem has a useful function in some hem styles. A bias strip is sometimes used as a hem interface. This adds fullness to the finished garment and reduce wrinkling.

The hem stitches that are commonly used for hand-sewn hems include: pick stitch; catch stitch (also called a herringbone stitch); slip stitch; and blind stitch.

Sewing machines can make a stitch that appears nearly invisible by using a blind-stitch setting and a blind stitch foot. Blind-stitches are commonly used to finish hems of applique designs on fabric. Modern sewing machines designed for home use can make many decorative or functional stitches, so the number of possible hem treatments is large. These home-use machines can also sew a reasonable facsimile of a hem-stitch, though the stitches will usually be larger and more visible.

Clothing factories and professional tailors use a "blind hemmer", or hemming machine, which sews an invisible stitch quickly and accurately. A blind hemmer sews a chain stitch, using a bent needle, which can be set precisely enough to actually sew through one and a half thicknesses of the hemmed fabric. A rolled hem presser foot on a sewing machine enables quick and easy hemming even by home sewers.

Heavy material with deep hems may be hemmed with what is called a dressmaker's hem—an extra line of loose running stitch is added in the middle of the hem, so that all the weight of the cloth does not hang from one line of stitching.

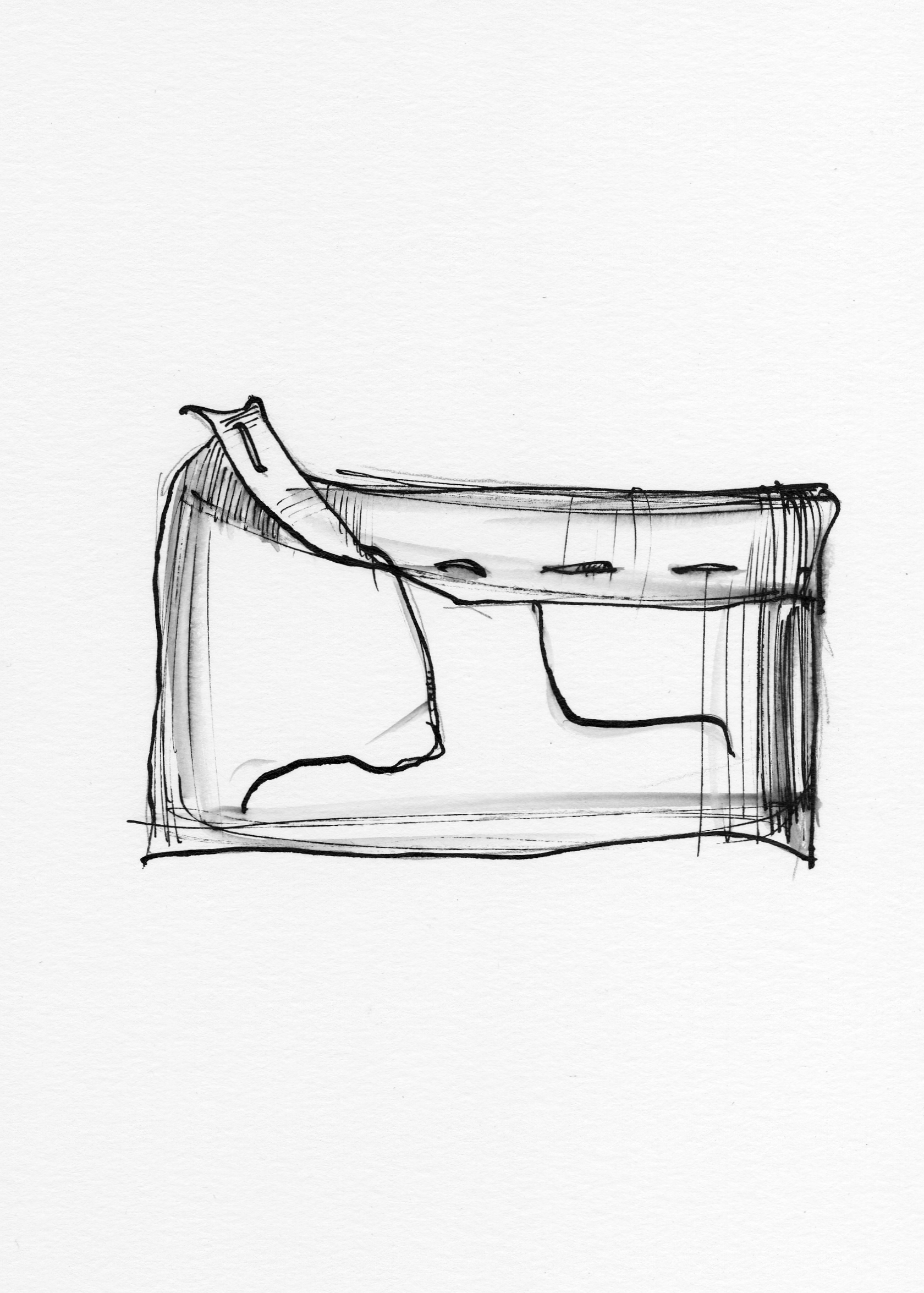
Sketch of a hem, showing folded top edge and thread

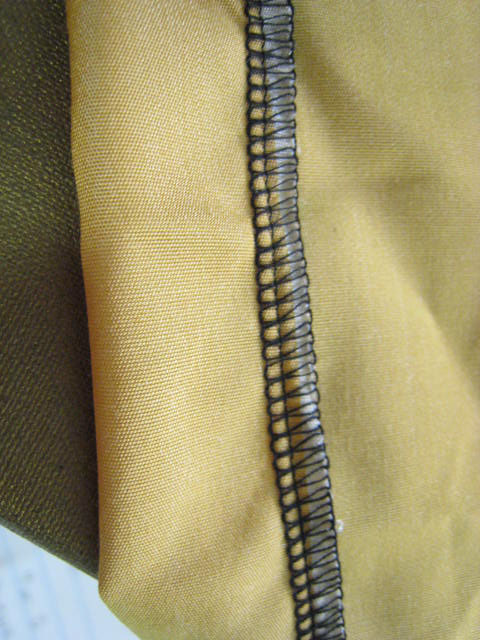
A five-thread overlock hem made with a serger machine, on the inside of the garment. On the outside, it appears as a blind stitch.

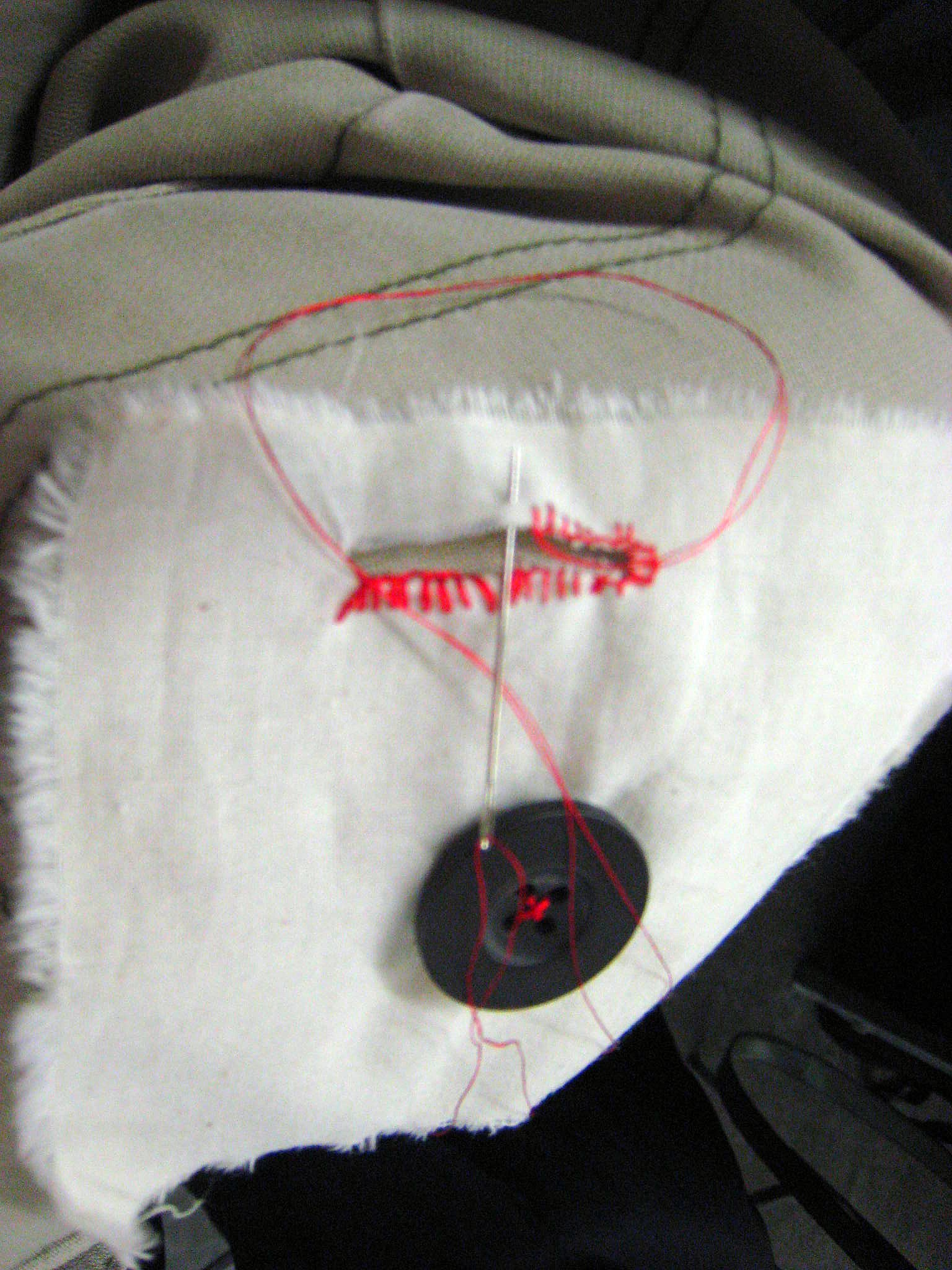
A buttonhole stitch hems the opening around a button hole.

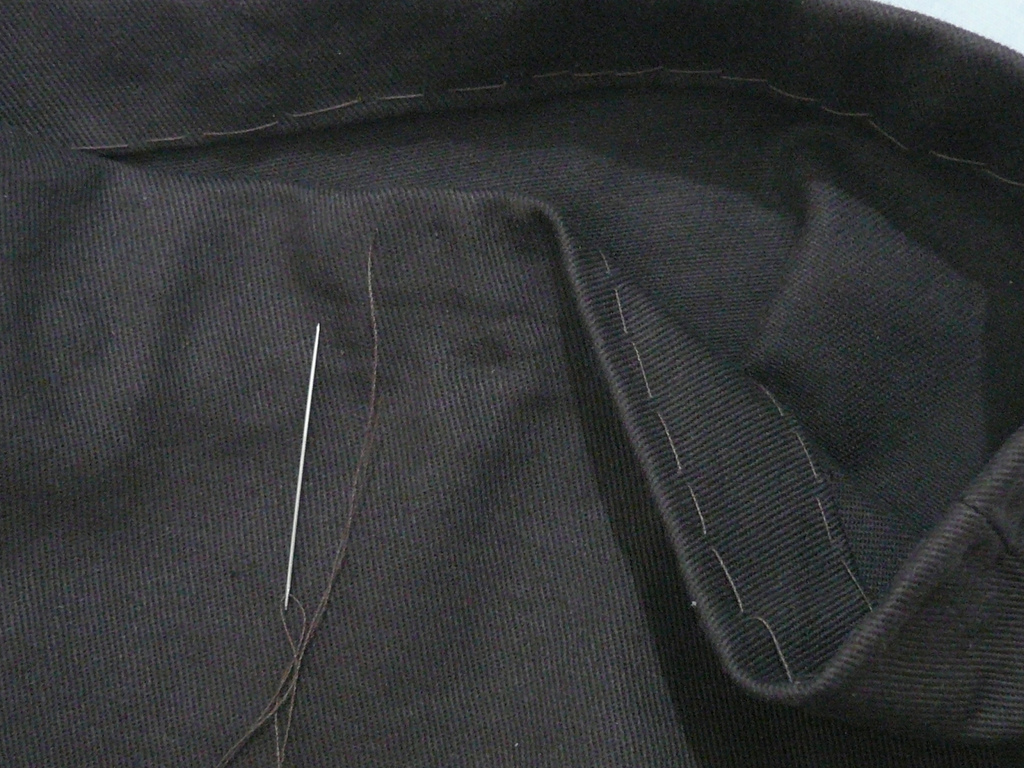
A pick stitch hem made with thread that matches the fabric, to appear invisible on the outside of the garment

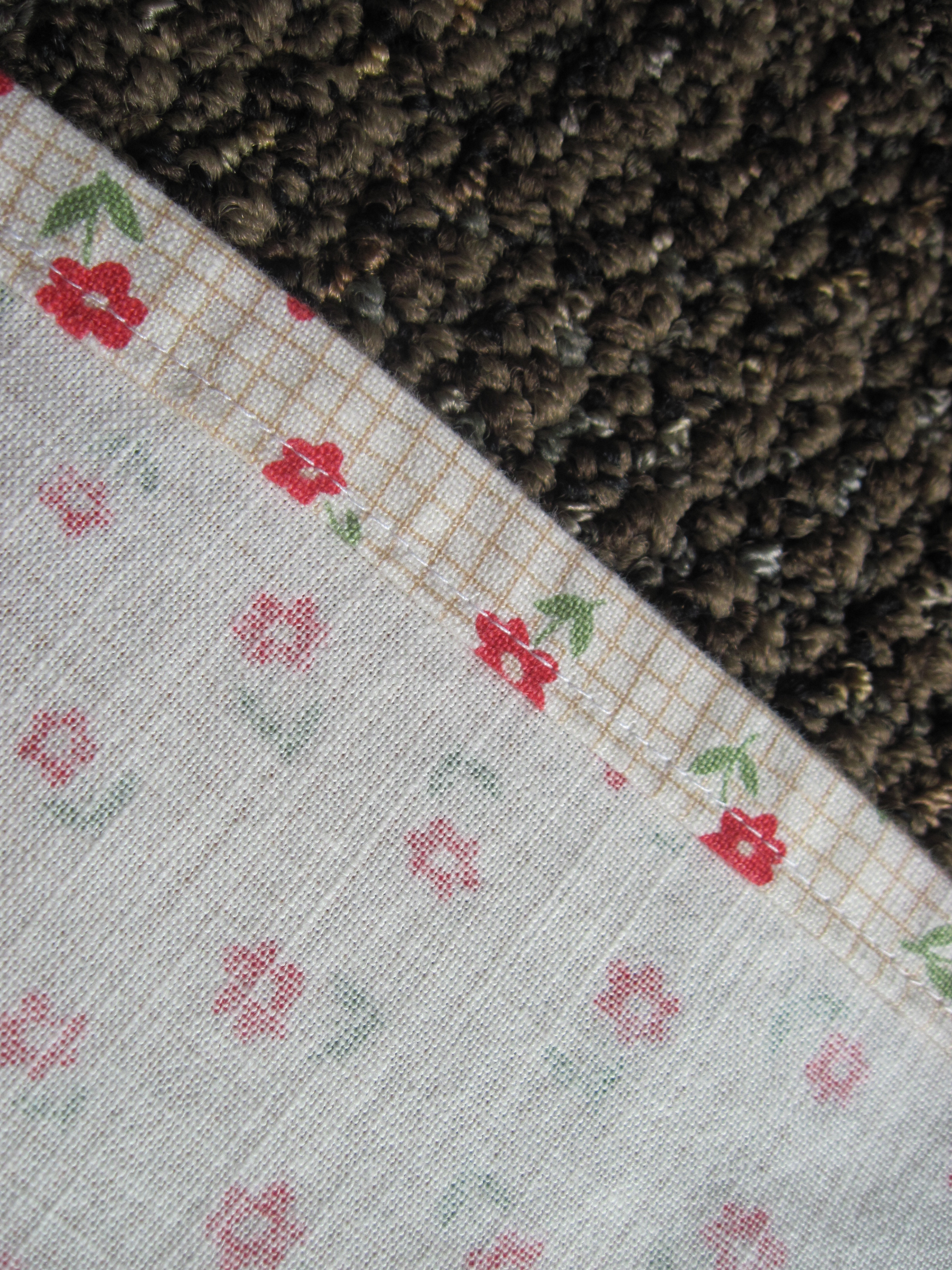
A plain hem, folded once and sewn with a running stitch

== Hem repair ==
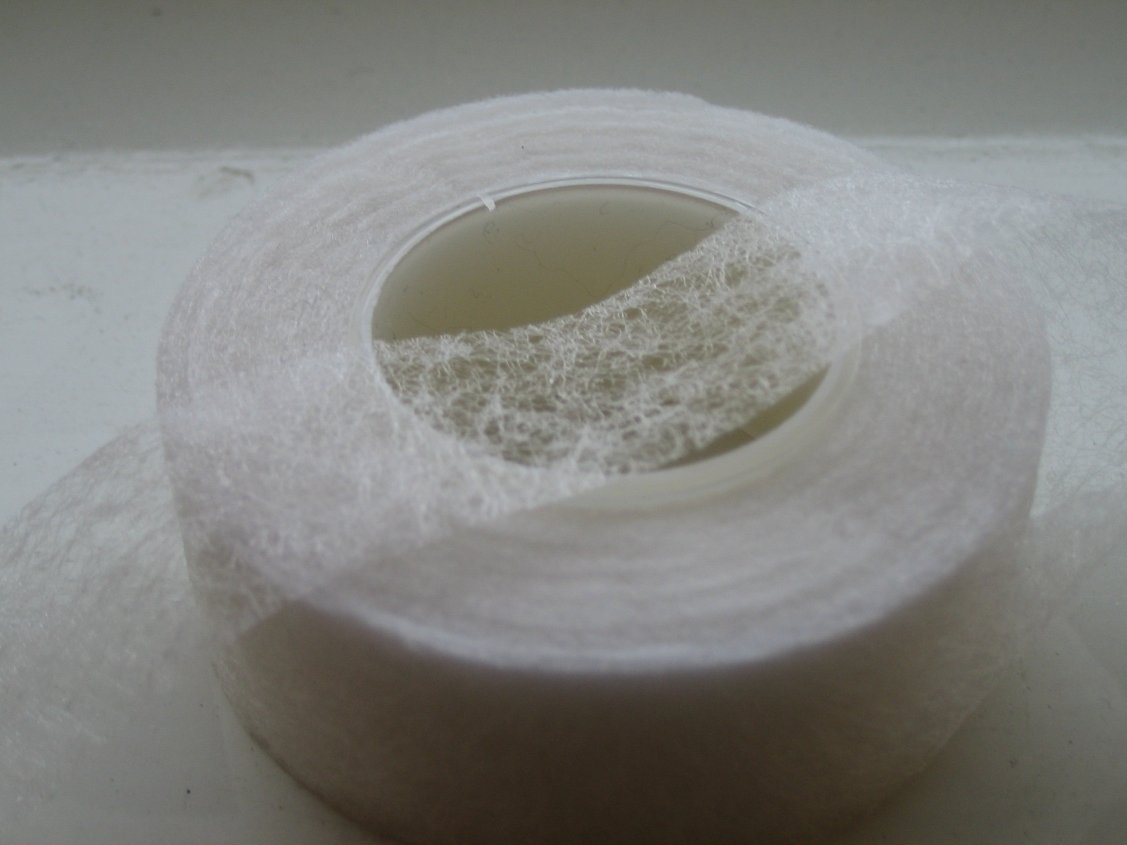
Hem repair tape

Hem repair tape is a type of non-woven fusible interfacing available as a continuous, thin length. It is designed for use as an alternative solution to sewing or fixing a hem. To affect a fix, the hem repair tape is laid around the inside of the hem. It is then ironed on a high heat; the heat causes the tape to bond the two surfaces together.

== See also ==
- Hemline
- Lettuce hem
