= Textile stabilization =

Conservation method

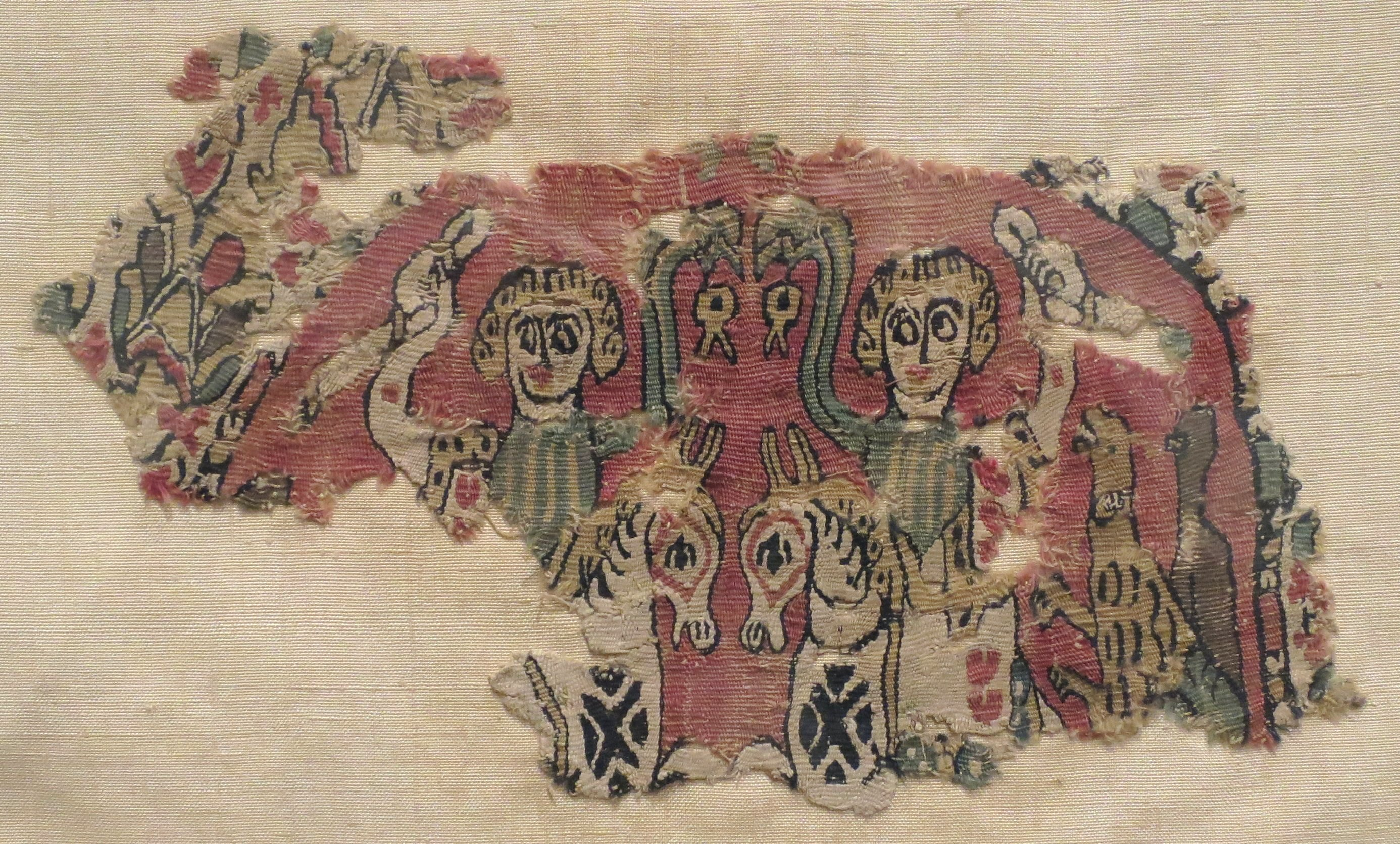
Coptic tunic tapestry fragment displaying characteristic physical deterioration that is treated through stabilization techniques.

Textile stabilization is a conservation method for fiber and yarn-based cloth intended to mitigate damage, prevent degradation and preserve structural integrity. Stabilization is part of a broad set of techniques in the field of conservation and restoration of textiles typically undertaken by a specialist or textile conservator. Appropriate treatment is determined through risk assessment and close examination of a textile's characteristics and the nature of the damage. Organic and synthetic fibers become weak due to age, handling, and environmental exposure and display physical deterioration such as fraying, planar distortion, loss, and change in surface character. Treatment involves reinforcing tensile strength and reintegration of parts for aesthetic, functional, and historic preservation. Methods can include stitching, darning, reweaving, and the attachment of supports through overlays and underlays. Hand-sewing follows the mantra of “gently does it” using fine needles, supple yarns, and a light touch. Heavily damaged and fragile fabrics often require stabilization through adhesive consolidation, though this is less common. It is essential that conservators consider physical and chemical compatibility along with future treatability in choosing a stabilization technique.

== Deterioration of textiles ==
=== Types of fibers ===
The fibers that make up textiles impact the types and rate of deterioration. There are four fiber types.

- Plant: Stems, leaves, seeds
- Animal: hair, wool, silk
- Synthetic: rayon, cellulose acetate, triacetate, natural rubber, nylon, polyester, polyurethanes
- Metal: gold, silver, copper alloys

Decisions about appropriate textile stabilization are most effective when the fibers are identified. The primary method of determining a fiber type is through polarized light microscopy. Simple compound microscopes, solubility, and chemical tests can also be employed. The Museum of Fine Arts Boston created a Conservation & Art Materials Encyclopedia Online that includes a fiber reference image library that can aid in fiber identification.

=== Agents of deterioration ===
Textiles deteriorate naturally as the fibers age. Managing the rate of deterioration is the goal when caring for textiles. External forces can increase the amount of deterioration in fabrics. In addition to aging, the following agents contribute to decay.

- Light and temperature impact the speed of deterioration, especially in combination with other agents of decay. Exposure of any length to light causes fading. Light both visible and UV can bleach and dry textiles as well as fade color. It is recommended that light is kept at 50 lux for textiles while on display. The length of exposure to light is determined by the type of textile and the object's current condition.
- Physical agents of decay include the natural breakdown of biological material, which causes fabrics to become more brittle as they age. Humidity is a factor that impacts textile fibers. Loss of moisture decreases the elasticity and increases brittleness. An environment that is too humid encourages pest activity and the growth of mold. Pests affect the physical makeup of textiles by eating fibers, and this destabilizes the fabrics. Pest activity can also discolor materials. Mold weakens and stains textiles.
- Chemical deterioration of textiles is caused by a variety of interactions. For example, the interaction of fibres with metals, pollutants, adhesives and other even other fibers can cause deterioration. Oxidation of metal threads or adornments can discolor and tarnish textiles due to the chemical reaction between the oxygen in the air and the fibers. Pollution impacts textiles. Pollution can come from the environment or the actual textile manufacturing process. These pollutants include pollen, mold, skin cells, ash, dirt and metal dust. Sources can include the museum exhibit and storage materials and air coming in from outside the museum. Materials used in storage may chemically react with the natural off-gassing that occurs as textiles decay.

== Methods ==
=== Localized and overall support ===
Fabric may be used to provide support for the garment by stabilizing weak sections or by creating a backing or lining for the piece. Darning may be utilized on coarsely-woven fabrics with localized areas of damage.

==== Fabric properties ====
- Should not cause damage through friction with the original fabric
- Be of similar or lighter weight than the original fabric.
- Match the original fabric with consideration of the loss of color or sheen
- Be of a tight enough weave to exclude dust if being used as a barrier

=== Overlay ===
Translucent or sheer fabrics are used to stabilize the textile without altering its appearance. This is typically done using nylon netting, silk crepeline, or polyester Tetex. Overlay is generally applied to textiles too fragile to withstand localized stitching methods. Overlay materials may be stitched to a more stable backing fabric.

== Materials and technique ==
Many variables impact decisions about thread weight, stitching method, and stitch length. Some of these variables include "the size of the loss, desired aesthetic and type of stitching thread." The conservator must weigh the impact of the stitching on the textile. Another consideration is the spacing of the stitches. Higher density stitching is more robust but less elastic and creates more holes in the fabric. Low-density stitching is weaker, is more flexible, and produces fewer holes. Conservation stitching must balance the needs of the textile in question with the impact the process of stitching will have on the object. A best practice is to plan out the intended stitches and utilize any existing stitching holes in the textile. It is essential that all methods of stabilizing the textile be appropriately documented.

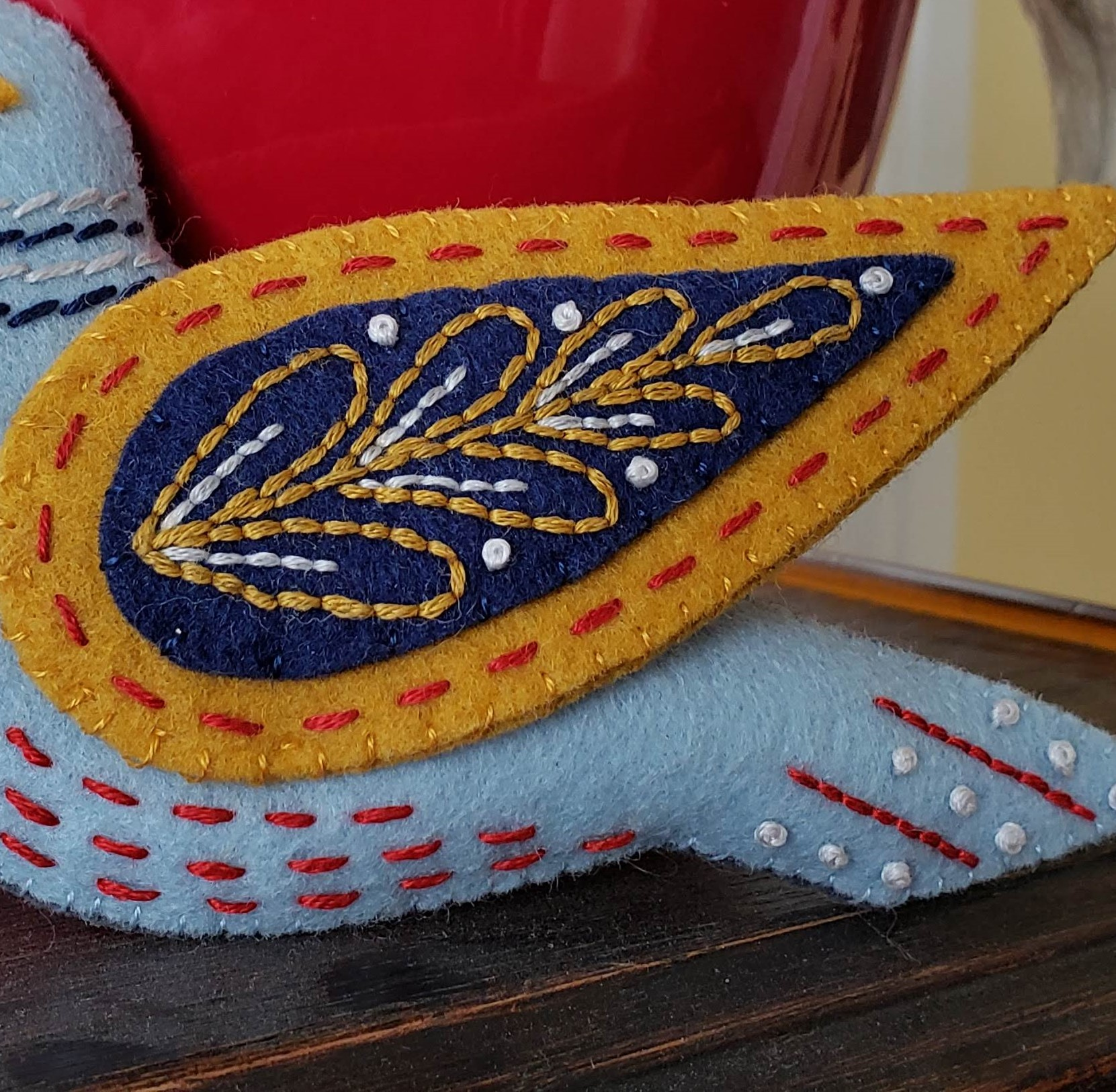
Embellishment of a bird wing with Running Stitch Embroidery.

- Stitching methods: There are many methods of stitching used in textile conservation. A great resource with videos on each method can be found on the CCI video "Stitches Used in Textile Conservation."
- Whip stitch is employed to join two fabrics. If the stabilizing fabric is not wide enough to cover the entire loss area, the whip stitch can join two pieces of stabilizer or any two fabrics.selvages.
- Straight stitch attaches a stabilizing fabric to large textiles and evenly distributes the weight hold large textiles to a new backing fabric while distributing the weight of the textile evenly. The stitch is small, nearly invisible on the top of the textile with a longer stitch length on the back.
- Herringbone stitch secures the edges of a textile to a backing fabric. This stitch is also a flexible way to join more than one layer of fabric. Herrigbone stitch is similar to a cross stitch with interlocking stitches.
- Slip-stitch is used to secure a backing fabric and is nearly invisible on the right side of the fabric.
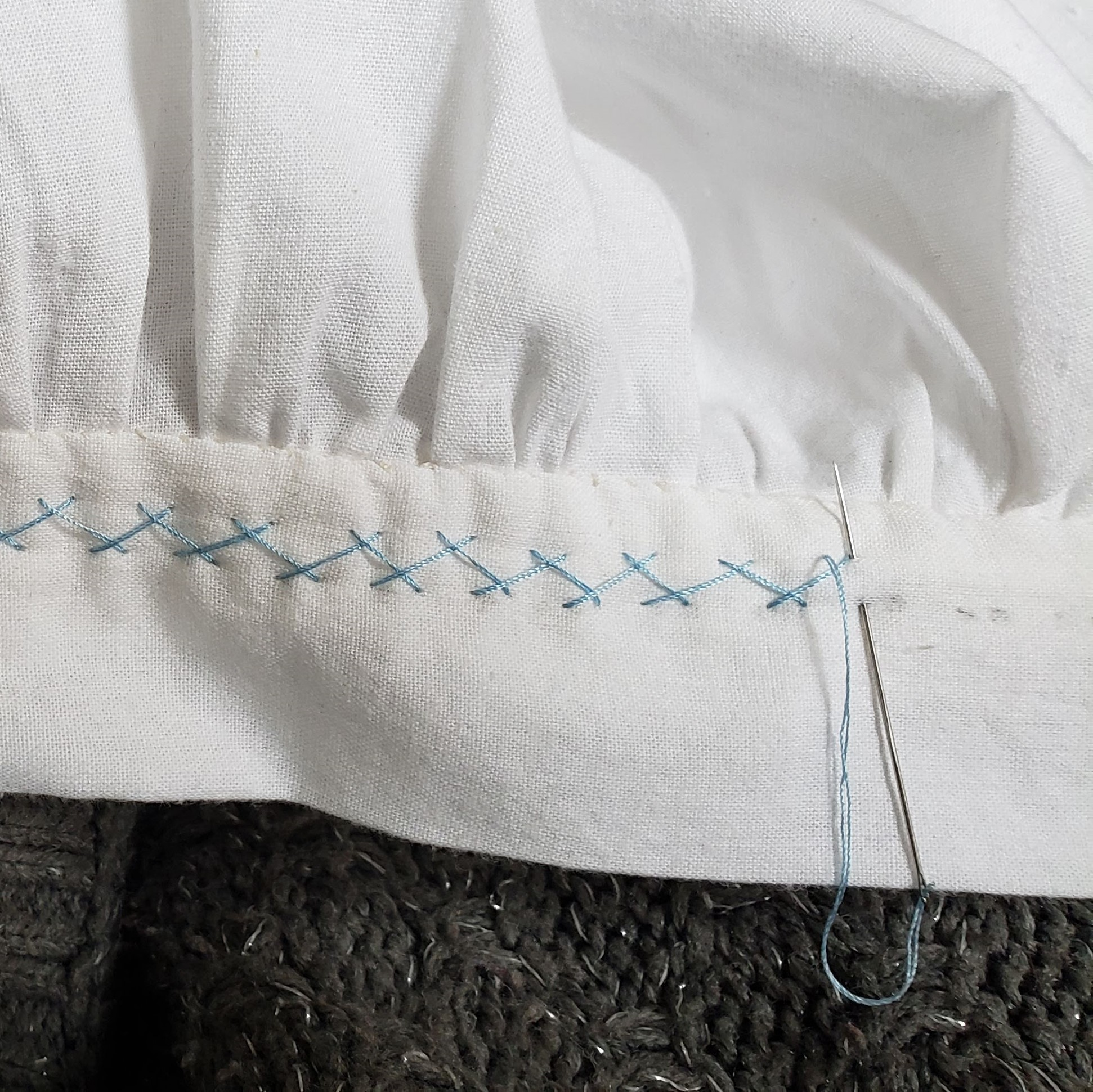
- Herringbone embroidery embellishment on waistband.
  Couching is the most commonly used stitching method in textile stabilization. Torn, frayed, or weak areas can be secured to a support fabric with couching. Generally, a 5mm stitch spacing will give stability and be quicker to stitch than a closer spacing.
- Darning stitch is used to cover areas of loss and prevent further degradation.
- Laid couching is a long straight stitch, held in place with short perpendicular stitches.
- Brick couching is a short stitch placed over one or several threads and sewn in a brick-work like pattern.
- Thread types cotton thread is the most commonly used thread for stabilizing textiles. Fine polyester is also acceptable.

== Damage analysis ==
Conservation science plays a large role in damage analysis of textiles offering the opportunity to investigate the properties of textile materials less invasively.

- Organoleptic examination or sensory analysis is the most basic form of investigation for textiles. This can include visible damage as well as smells that indicate pollutants, humidity, and decomposition of organic materials.
- Sampling should be used minimally to help with the inspection of fibers. Sampling requires the extraction of a small amount of the material.
- Inspection of fibers can include Fourier transform infrared (FTIR), Raman, and attenuated total reflectance (ATR) spectroscopy, “When sampling a work of art is deemed appropriate, scientists routinely use scanning electron microscopy–energy dispersive spectroscopy (SEM-EDS), X-ray diffraction (XRD), and Fourier transform infrared spectroscopy (FTIR).”
- (ATR): attenuated total reflectance is a sampling technique used in conjunction with infrared spectroscopy which enables samples to be examined directly in the solid or liquid state without further preparation. This process is ideal for optically dense materials.
- (FTIR): Fourier transform infrared spectroscopy is a technique used to obtain an infrared spectrum of absorption or emission of a solid, liquid or gas. An FTIR spectrometer simultaneously collects high-resolution spectral data over a wide spectral range. This process requires computer processing to convert raw data into usable results related to wavelengths that indicate how materials absorb or emit infrared light.
- (SEM-EDS): scanning electron microscopy–energy dispersive spectroscopy is used for directly studying the surfaces of solid objects, that utilizes a beam of focused electrons of relatively low energy as an electron probe that is scanned in a regular manner over the specimen. The electron source and electromagnetic lenses that generate and focus the beam are similar to those described for the transmission electron microscope (TEM). The action of the electron beam stimulates the emission of high-energy backscattered electrons and low-energy secondary electrons from the surface of the specimen. data from this process can be used to create 3D renderings of materials.
- (XRD): X-ray diffraction is a phenomenon in which the atoms of a crystal, by virtue of their uniform spacing, cause an interference pattern of the waves present in an incident beam of X rays. The atomic planes of the crystal act on the X rays in exactly the same manner as does a uniformly ruled grating on a beam of light. X-ray signals can be used to map estimate the concentration of elements in the sample.
- Microscopic Examination offers the ability to see the damage that is invisible to the naked eye, as well as aid in identifying specific materials. The identification of fibers “may not only adduce the origin of an artifact, for example, but can also serve as a predictor of behavior and so is essential in allowing an informed decision on conservation protocol.
- Vibrational spectroscopy covers a range of techniques, including conventional Fourier transform infrared (FTIR), Raman, and attenuated total reflectance (ATR) spectroscopy. These methods have been variously employed for the study of textile fibers, not only to identify the fibers themselves and their state of deterioration but also to confirm processing and dye treatment. Stabilization treatments for archaeological textiles have been laid out in field guides and reports with general guidelines but they seldom specify fiber type when discussing stabilization treatments. Tarleton & Ordoñez state “Some of these treatments utilize materials such as surfactants, lubricants, or consolidants.”

== Stabilization techniques ==
The choice of physical intervention has become less popular in the past few decades as preventative conservation techniques have gained popularity. These shifts have made storage techniques including removal from display popular alternatives to conservation stitching and removal of damaged parts of the textile. Stabilization treatments aim to prevent additional deterioration of objects to assure that they are useful for future study and analysis. Stabilization treatments for archaeological textiles have been laid out in field guides and reports with general guidelines but they seldom specify fiber type when discussing stabilization treatments. Tarleton & Ordoñez state “Some of these treatments utilize materials such as surfactants, lubricants, or consolidants.”

Removal of an object from the display may be necessary due to the fragile and complex nature of textiles. Continued exposure to light, humidity fluctuations, and pollutants. Because many textiles are hung when they are displayed removal from the exhibition can mitigate wear and tear caused by gravity and hanging methods. This approach may be temporary in the case of the need for physical intervention but may also be a long-term decision for purpose of future study and preservation.

The correct "choice of appropriate fabric color/texture is critical if the textile ground is translucent or if the fabric is expected to compensate for future losses.”

Overview:

- Localized loss including holes, wear, and tear require stabilization.
- Implementing localized supports such as patches or fills.
- Stitching can also strengthen damaged areas.
- Shear fabric overlays are also useful in combination with lower layers of supporting fabrics.
- Choice of stitching versus overlay should be considered in relation to the overall condition and material of the fabric.

=== Stabilization that provides partial support or protection ===
Structural weakness and damage must be supported in textiles, especially areas such as the top of tapestries and the shoulders of garments

=== Backing fabrics ===
In these cases, a backing fabric can be used. Backing fabrics must be durable and able to withstand tensioned in order to offer support, but not so heavy that it causes strain on the original textile. The fabric should extend beyond the damaged areas in combination with appropriate stitching in weak areas when used in combination with local repairs and visual compensation techniques.

=== Overlays ===
Significant structural weaknesses or damaged areas that do not support the textile such as bottom borders of tapestries or hems have different requirements. Borders or edges that are smaller can be wrapped to the back with a sheer overlay fabric to create a binding or facing. Partial or full backing secured with stitching is appropriate in other areas. Protection of exposed floats of the stabilization stitching, may require full-sized secondary linings.

=== Full backing ===
Single-layer flat textiles with overall damage often require A full backing: Backing fabrics must be strong and capable of holding tension for proper support. They must be placed carefully to provide appropriate attachment as well. A full backing can be combined with patch or darning and/or with localized visual compensation techniques. Severely weakened textiles may need support from an archival-quality panel or board or fabric-covered stretcher or strainer may also be implemented.

=== Multilayer approaches ===
In the case of Multi-layer flat textiles where one or more layer(s) remains sturdy an overlay fabric can be used to secure the damaged layer(s) to an undamaged layer when the weakened layer(s) are separated from the sturdy layer(s), a full backing sewn or adhesive should be used to reattach it. Disassembly is avoided as it requires the removal of original stitching.

=== Cleaning ===
• surface (suction cleaning by vacuum)

• wet (cleaning with water or water plus detergent)

• dry (cleaning with organic solvents)

• spotting (treating of localized stains with wet or dry-cleaning solvents)

Wet, dry, and spotting treatments should always be conducted by professionals.

Vacuum maintenance of materials in open exhibit, textiles being returned to storage, and newly accessioned textiles before they are displayed or stored is best practice.

Aqueous cleaning of archaeological textiles achieves "relaxation of folds and removal of surface dirt without causing further weakening of the object.”

=== Drying ===
Drying a textile involves evaporating the free water, resulting in a dry fabric to which no additional chemicals have been introduced

The removal of the moisture from textiles has can be accomplished by either air-drying or freeze-drying the objects. The rate of evaporation during the air-drying process varies but can be controlled by altering the level of humidity, temperature, and air movement textile while during the treatment.

=== Three dimensional artifacts ===
Three-dimensional artifacts that have been damaged often require Full backings, but are difficult to apply to three-dimensional textiles. Tailoring techniques such as darts, gathering, similar to original construction techniques can be employed to create shaped backings or supports Occasionally, disassembly is permitted for three-dimensional materials. Shaped forms are also sometimes used as supports. When textiles are used in three-dimensional structures such as covered boxes and upholstered furniture are damaged an overlay can be stitched into lower layers. A less invasive treatment option is passive support.

Conditions for use of passive supports:

- no major structural damages (tears or holes)

- The ground fabric must be intact.

- Ideally the textile on its original strainer.

- Requires protection against puncture.

- Supplementary supports help in limit damages as a result of vibration, shock, and flexing.

- The fabric requires additional protection because it is sagging on the strainer.

- In the event that the textile has never been removed from its original strainer.

The below techniques must be modified to accommodate original lacing:

A padded insert provides passive protection. A padded, fabric-covered insert should be created specifically for the object to fill the strainer. Polyester felt or batting can be utilized for a precise fit. A rigid backing (archival-quality rag board of appropriate thickness/rigidity), should be affixed to the insert by thread ties, sewing, or adhesives is used to keep the padded insert secure. A secondary strainer stretched with sheer fabric is another option for passive protection, which fits inside the original strainer. Materials such as Tetex® (Stabiltex®), permits viewing of the back. The secondary strainer must be flush and fixed with the textile and must not move inside the original strainer. Secondary strainers require awareness of the properties of the textiles and original mounting materials.

Challenges: “Textile conservators are often required to treat complex feathered objects found in textile collections. Traditional cleaning methods are not always suitable for every situation and alternative methods may therefore be necessary, particularly for localized soil removal.”

=== Storage ===
In the event that an object is removed from an exhibition, for treatment, or transportation careful examination of the state of the textile is required for best practice conservation records, accession records, and curatorial notes. The various materials and techniques discussed above should be employed, as well as careful consideration of humidity, light, and pollution that may be a threat during transport and handling.

=== Ethics ===
When considering any of these methods of treatment ethical concerns should also be factored into the assessment. Textiles may have historical and cultural significance that conflict with their status as a museum object. In these cases, it is important to connect with the appropriate experts to create a plan that respects any cultural heritage boundaries while honoring a commitment to preserve and display objects in alignment with an institution's mission statement.

== Fabric supports ==
=== Choosing a support ===
Compatibility of support fabrics is crucial when selecting a support material. Because textiles vary so greatly careful research is necessary when making these choices. There are alternative options to fabric supports that are also important to consider. Composition, processing, structure, rigidity, and weight are all factors to consider when determining the appropriateness of a paper-based or non-textile material as a support for stabilization. The physical and chemical compatibility of textiles and long-term stability should also be evaluated for materials that will be stored in close proximity to textile artifacts.

=== Fabric types ===
==== Nylon netting ====
The open structure of nylon net makes it the most commonly used sheer overlay fabric. One of its most notable attributes is that it does not unravel or fray. Nylon is susceptible to light-catalyzed degradation, thus the lifespan of the nylon may contradict its purpose if the artifact is being exhibited.

Textile Conservators may use either heat set or bobbinet netting, both of which do not fray but are susceptible to degradation and reactions from light. Netting may be used together with a backing fabric.

==== Heat set ====
Heat-set nylon net has a stiff and abrasive hand feel, and is offered in a wide variety of colors. Heat setting is a term used in the textile industry to describe a thermal process usually taking place in either a steam atmosphere or a dry heat environment.

==== Bobbinet ====
Bobbinet-constructed nylon net has a better hand and drape than heat-set nylon net or polyester Tetex® (Stabiltex®), but, is only offered in white, off-white, and black. However, it is often and easily dyed. Bobbinet tulle fabrics have long been used for high-quality exclusive curtains, bridalwear, haute couture fashion, lingerie, embroidery, where it is used as a base cloth for the actual embroidery, and as base nets for high-quality wigs. Use has also extended into technical applications where the material's properties are more important than its appearance.

==== Silk crepeline ====
Silk crepeline is less sheer than nylon netting and is also susceptible to reactions to light, but may be used as an overlay technique as well as for patching specific areas and can be easily dyed. Because it can fray, the edges need to be hemmed, which can create less sheer areas.

==== Polyester Tetex (Stabiltex) ====
The least sheer overlay material, Tetex also has a sheen and is available in a selected range of colors which are not easily dyed. The material does not require hemming but is the most difficult to drape over fabrics. It is most often chosen for its long-term stability.

== Consolidation ==
=== Adhesive consolidation ===
Fragile and brittle fabrics, or those that would be damaged by needle and thread repairs, can be consolidated using adhesive techniques. Consolidation is less common than stitching methods. Lack of extensive research into the long-term stability of synthetic adhesives and their compatibility with natural fibers has contributed to polarized debate over the appropriateness of adhesive consolidation. The complexity of treatments and limited expertise with theory and practice and often prevent conservators from choosing this option. Among the variables to be considered are the concentration and number of coats of adhesive, substrates, and application and reactivation methods. Evaluation of past consolidation failures and successes, and interdisciplinary collaboration among professionals, have led to a more refined and informed practice. Despite the challenges, skillfully applied adhesive supports are a viable alternative to stitching.

=== Reversibility ===
Minimal intervention, reversibility, and future treatability are core principles of contemporary conservation. Adhesive treatments that have failed or exceeded their lifespan may need to be removed, which may compromise or further damage delicate textiles. Because affixed supports can affect a fabric's drape or hand, and reversibility is not assured, conservators should evaluate alternative methods before proceeding with treatment. Despite these factors, adhesive consolidation is often the only option for severely damaged textiles. As with all types of treatment, conservators need to find a balance between intervention and potential loss of the artifact, a decision that requires a thoughtful weighing of risks and assessment of the post-treatment consequences. Some alternatives to adhesive consolidation include crepeline encapsulation, pressure mounts, and customized non-vertical display systems.

=== Choosing an adhesive ===
Adhesives are selected based on archival properties and compatibility with textiles and treatment goals. The following criteria are evaluated: age-test performance, flexibility, bond strength, heat sealing temperature, pH, solubility, color stability, volatile emissions, and glass transition temperature (Tg). Display and storage orientation and conditions are also factored in because adhesives with high glass transition temperatures can tend to creep when applied to hanging textiles.

Adhesives fall into four categories:

==== Thermoplastic adhesives ====
These represent the most widespread class of textile adhesives, favored for their low toxicity and ease of application. Products such as Mowilith^{®} DMC2, Vinamul^{®} 3252, Vinnapas^{®} EP1 are used with fragmented silks and friable cellulosics like cotton. Beva^{®} 371 is typically used with painted textiles due to its solubility in white spirits (mineral spirits), which don't damage the painted surface. Lascaux 360HV is favored for highly degraded materials because of its low activation temperature.

==== Modified cellulose adhesives ====
These water-compatible adhesives are appropriate for treatments requiring a light bond. Klucel G, carboxymethyl cellulose, and methylcellulose are the most common.

==== Starch-based adhesives ====
Starch pastes can be applied with cold lining techniques, which are preferred over heat and pressure-based methods when dealing with degraded or fragile fibers. Carbohydrate-based adhesives are often made from wheat starch and arrowroot/sodium alginate. They are frequently used with Japanese scrolls and panels due to material compatibility and coherence with traditional techniques.

==== Protein-based adhesives ====
Protein-based adhesives are less prevalent and typically used to consolidate painted textiles or multi-media objects, of which fabric is one component. They include isinglass, gelatin, and animal glues.

=== Treatment process ===
Preliminary testing, preferably on a like textile, is essential to establish a conservation strategy that effectively stabilizes the object through minimal intervention. Treatment starts with the selection of a compatible adhesive and support substrate. The material options are the same as those used for stitching methods. Silk crepeline is popular because it is more pliable than polyester crepeline (Stabiltex), but paper can also be a suitable support depending on the object. Substrata can be dyed to match the color of the textile being consolidated. Surface preparation involves adhesive application by brush, roller, sponge, or spraying in a fume-extraction booth. The prepared substrate is then placed adhesive side down over the textile and covered with absorbent blotting paper that is pinned or weighted. Methods of affixing the adhesive support to the textile artifact include spatula or flat iron, vacuum hot table, vacuum cold-lining, solvent activation, and direct wet or semi-dry application. For instance, cellulose and starch-coated paper can be activated with steam vapor and applied to the textile through vacuum cold-lining creating a bond with the underlying material.

== Documentation ==
Documentation is fundamental to conservation practice and should occur before, during, and after textile stabilization treatments. Examination and recording provide clarity on an object's structure and condition and serve as the basis for future care and scholarship. Documentation includes a general description of the object prior to treatment, followed by a systematic examination of the area(s) to be stabilized. All of the materials and methods used in treatment should be identified along with a step-by-step description of the work done, accompanied by diagrams and color photographs of the process. It is recommended that brand name products used in treatment include a description of the chemical composition for future reference. Specific areas of damage can be documented through tracings on sheets of Mylar to identify localized interventions. Information learned through physical and visual analysis and details on the treatment process from start to finish culminate in a final report.
