= Pix =

Pix or PIX may refer to:

== Abbreviations ==
- Pictures
- "Pix", abbreviation used by Variety magazine for the phrase motion pictures

== Television ==
- Short for KPIX-TV, television channel 5, San Francisco
- Sony Pix, an English movie channel in India
- Short for WPIX, television channel 11, New York City

== Technology ==
- Pix (payment system), a Brazilian electronic payment system
- Cisco PIX, an IP firewall and network address translation (NAT) appliance
- Kid Pix, a bitmap drawing program aimed at children
- Microsoft Pix, a camera phone app for iOS from Microsoft
- PIX (Microsoft), a performance analysis tool for DirectX from Microsoft

== Media ==
- Moon Pix, the fourth album by American singer-songwriter Cat Power
- Pix (magazine), an Australian magazine published from 1938 to 1972
- Sunday Pix, a Christian comic book published weekly

== People ==
- Mary Pix (1666–1709), English novelist and playwright
- Noel Pix (born 1977), a German rock and house musician

== Other uses ==
- Glass Eye Pix, an independent film studio based in New York City
- Pix Brook, a stream that flows through Letchworth Garden City in Hertfordshire, England
- Pix Capri Theatre, a theater on the historic US Highway 51 in Jackson, Mississippi

== See also ==
- PICS (disambiguation)
- Pyx (disambiguation)
