= Lockpick (disambiguation) =

A lockpick is a tool used in lockpicking.

Lockpick may also refer to:

- Earwig Lockpicker, a fictional character in the Kender fantasy race
- Remo Lockpick, another fictional Kender character, uncle to Tasslehoff Burrfoot
- Lockpick Pornography, a 2005 novella by Joey Comeau
- LockPick Entertainment, developer/publisher of the video game Dreamlords
- The Lockpicker, a 2016 Canadian drama film

== See also ==
- Pick (disambiguation)
