= Pyx (disambiguation) =

Pyx or PYX may refer to:

- PyX (vector graphics language), vector graphics library
- The Pyx, a 1973 Canadian film
- Pyx, a host container
- Trial of the Pyx, a UK quality assurance procedure for newly minted coins
- Pyx Lax, a Greek rock band
- Pyxis, a constellation, abbreviated as Pyx
- PYX, IATA airport code for Pattaya Airpark in Thailand, in List of airports by IATA code: P
- .pyx, a file extension used to write Python code in C using Cython
