= Pick (surname) =

Pick is a surname of multiple origins. People with this surname include:

- Albert Pick (1922–2015), German numismatist
- Arnold Pick (1851–1924), Jewish Czech neurologist and psychiatrist
- Frank Pick (1878–1941), British transport administrator
- Georg Alexander Pick (1859–1942), Austrian mathematician
- Heinrich Pick (1882–1947), German politician
- Lewis A. Pick (1890–1956), United States Army lieutenant general and Chief of Engineers
- Ludwig Pick (1868–1944), German pathologist
- Lupu Pick (1886–1931), German actor, film director, producer and screenwriter
- Nancy Pick, American nonfiction author
- Samuel Perkins Pick (1858–1919), English architect
- Svika Pick (1949-2022), Israeli singer, songwriter, composer, and television personality
- Thomas Pickering Pick (1841–1919), British surgeon and author
