= Pick stitch =

Sewing stitch

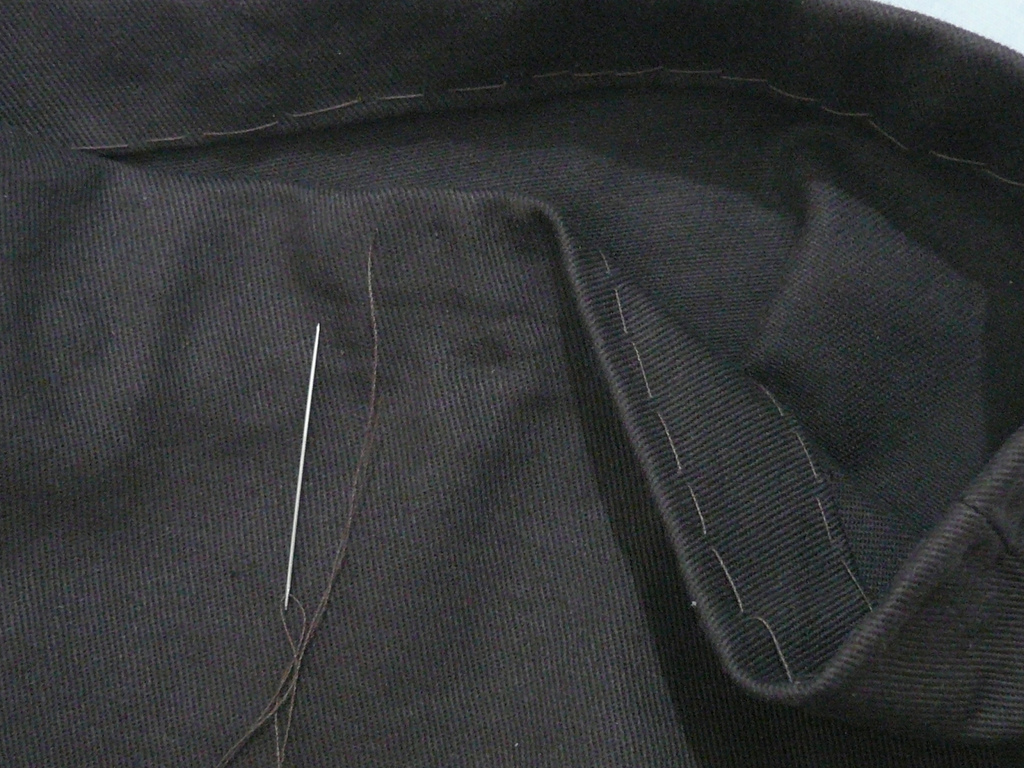
A pick stitched hem using thread that closely matches the colour of the fabric, appearing almost invisible on the outside of the garment.

A pick stitch in sewing is a simple running stitch that catches only a few threads of the fabric, showing very little of the thread on the right side (outer side) of the garment. It is also sometimes known as "stab stitch".

A pick stitch can be made from either the inside of the garment or the outside, depending upon how much thread is meant to show on the outside of the garment. A pick stitch is commonly used for making hems, although it is also used with contrasting thread to create a decorative finish on some garments. It has decorative uses in embroidery. It is exceedingly useful for inserting zips and is strong. Many home-sewers and new dressmakers find this much easier than inserting zips by sewing machine.

A pick stitch along the outside of a lapel is a hallmark of a "high-end, hand-made" men's suit or blazer. A finely made pick stitch is difficult to accomplish but can be achieved with practice.
