= Toothpick Lake =

Lake in Ontario, Canada

- Location within Ontario
- Location: Kenora District, Ontario
- Coordinates: 50°06′52″N 94°07′36″W
- Primary inflows: Wonderland Creek
- Primary outflows: Unnamed creek to Grassy Narrows Lake on the English River
- Basin countries: Canada
- Max. length: 8 km (5.0 mi)
- Max. width: 1.1 km (0.68 mi)
- Surface elevation: 322 m (1,056 ft)

Toothpick Lake is a lake in Kenora District, Ontario, Canada. It is about 8 kilometres (5.0 mi) long and 1.1 kilometres (0.7 mi) wide, and lies at an elevation of 322 metres (1,056 ft) about 5.6 kilometres (3.5 mi) southwest of the community of Grassy Narrows. The primary inflow is Wonderland Creek, and the primary outflow is an unnamed creek to Grassy Narrows Lake on the English River.

== See also ==
- List of lakes in Ontario
