= Blind stitch =

Hand or machine stitch type

Creating of a blind stitch in two steps (cross section and top view).

A blind stitch in sewing is a method of joining two pieces of fabric so that the stitch thread is invisible (or nearly invisible) during the normal use of the finished product. Blind stitching uses a folded edge of the fabric to hide the stitches; therefore, this type of stitch can be used to create a blind hem or to join two folded edges together.

Blind hem stitches are completely hidden when the garment is viewed from the outside, and almost completely hidden on the inside as well. The sewer catches only a few threads of the fabric each time the needle is pulled through the fabric, which means that the majority of the stitching is hidden inside the hem.

Blind stitching is useful when joining two folded edges together, as the thread is only visible when the folded material is pulled away. This technique allows the sewer to invisibly attach pockets, facings and trimmings to a garment.

A slip stitch or catch stitch can be used to create the blind stitch, except that they are worked inside the hem, 1/8 to 1/4 inch (3.2 to 6.4 mm) away from the edge of the hem fabric.

A sewing machine can also create a blind hem. In this case, a specialty presser foot is needed and the sewer must select the stitch pattern dedicated to blind hems. A zigzag stitch technique may be used with a sewing machine to create a blind stitch.

== Gallery ==
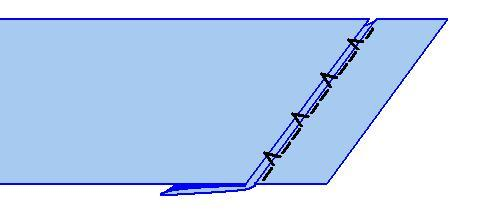
Blind stitch variant of the zigzag stitch

Production steps of a blind stitch: 1. Fold (inside) 2. iron flat, 3. sew, 4. flatten, 5. turn around (outside)

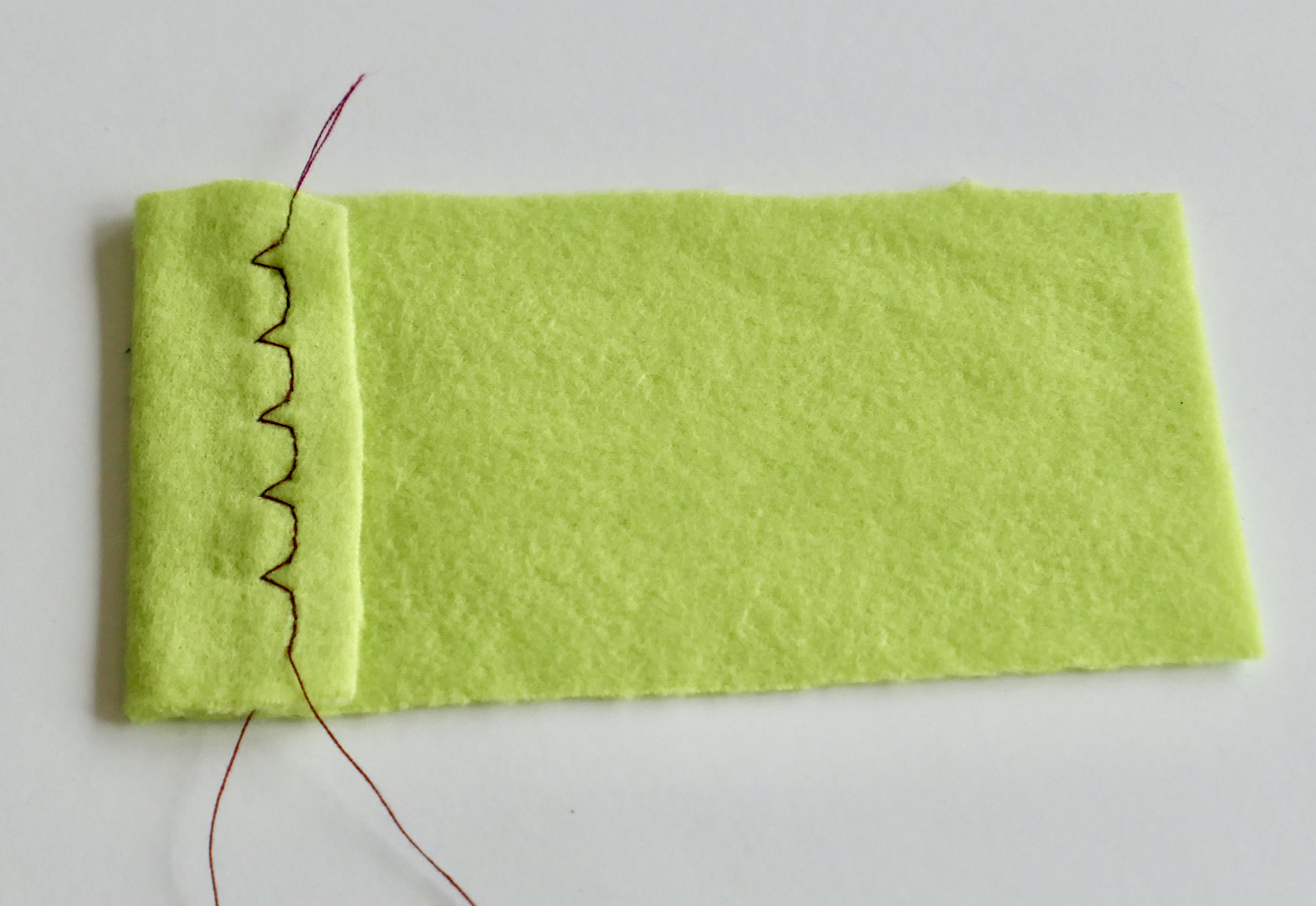
Inside with zigzag

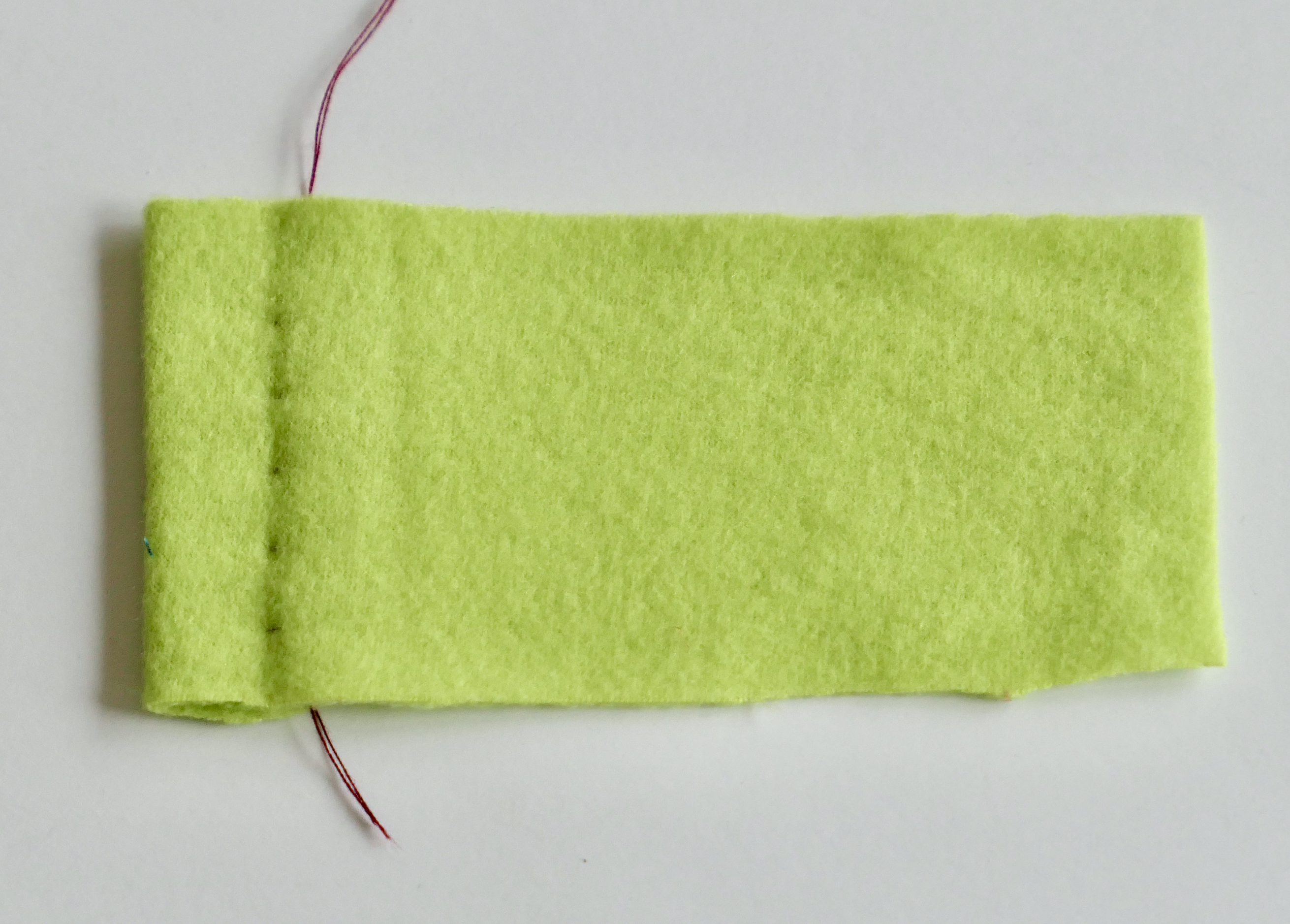
Outside with invisible seam

When sewing relatively thick material, a blind stitch that hits very close to the fold will enter and exit on the same side of the material, without puncturing the other side; this type of stitching can be used to make waterproof seams in neoprene and kamiks.
