= Pick Lake (Cochrane District, Ontario) =

Lake in Cochrane District, Ontario, Canada

- Location within Ontario
- Location: Timmins, Cochrane District, Ontario
- Coordinates: 48°41′16″N 81°01′47″W
- Lake type: Endorheic
- Basin countries: Canada
- Max. length: .5 km (0.31 mi)
- Max. width: .2 km (0.12 mi)
- Surface elevation: 312 m (1,024 ft)

Pick Lake is a small endorheic lake in Timmins, Cochrane District, Ontario, Canada. It is about 500 metres (1,640 ft) long and 200 metres (656 ft) wide, and lies at an elevation of 312 metres (1,024 ft) about 10.8 kilometres (6.7 mi) northwest of the Timmins neighbourhood of Connaught and 3.3 kilometres (2.1 mi) west of Frederick House Lake.

== See also ==
- List of lakes in Ontario
