= Cunningham (disambiguation) =

Cunningham is a surname of Scottish origin. It may also refer to:

== Places ==
=== Australia ===
- Division of Cunningham, an Australian Electoral Division in New South Wales
- Electoral district of Cunningham, a former State Electoral Division in Queensland
- Cunninghams Gap, a pass over the Great Dividing Range between the Darling Downs and Brisbane areas in Queensland
- Cunningham, Queensland, a locality in the Southern Downs Region on the Darling Downs
- Cunningham, South Australia, a locality on Yorke Peninsula in South Australia

=== Canada ===
- Cunningham Lake, British Columbia
- Cunningham Island, British Columbia
- Cunningham Creek, British Columbia

=== United States ===
- Cunningham, Georgia, an unincorporated community
- Cunningham Township, Champaign County, Illinois
- Cunningham, Kansas, a city
- Cunningham, Kentucky, an unincorporated community
- Cunningham, Chariton County, Missouri, an unincorporated community
- Cunningham, Pemiscot County, Missouri, an unincorporated community
- Cunningham, Ohio, an unincorporated community
- Cunningham, Montgomery County, Tennessee, an unincorporated community
- Cunningham, Obion County, Tennessee, an unincorporated community
- Cunningham, Texas, an unincorporated community
- Cunningham, Virginia, an unincorporated community
- Cunningham, Adams County, Washington, an unincorporated community
- Cunningham, West Virginia, an unincorporated community
- Lake Cunningham, California
- Cunningham Park, Queens, New York City, New York

=== Elsewhere ===
- Cunningham Glacier, Queen Maud Mountains, Antarctica
- Mount Cunningham, South Georgia Island
- Cunningham (Open Constituency, Fiji), a former electoral division
- Cunningham (crater), on Mercury
- 1754 Cunningham, an asteroid

== Transportation ==
- Cunningham Highway, from Ipswich to the Darling Downs in Queensland, Australia
- Cunningham Road, Bangalore, India
- Cunningham automobile, an American luxury car (1907-1937)
- Cunningham Steam Wagon, an American steam truck (1900-1901)

== Businesses ==
- Cunningham Broadcasting Corporation, owner of broadcast television stations in the United States
- Cunningham Drug (Canada), a defunct pharmacy chain
- Cunningham Drug (U.S.), an unrelated defunct pharmacy chain
- Cunningham Piano Company, a manufacturer of pianos

== Other uses ==
- Clan Cunningham, a Scottish clan
- Cunningham (sailing), a device to adjust the sail shape on yachts which is a form of Downhaul
- Cunningham baronets, six titles

== See also ==
- Coningham
- Conyngham
- Cunninghame, a district of Scotland
- Justice Cunningham (disambiguation)
