= Judge Cunningham =

Judge Cunningham may refer to:

- Benjamin Cunningham (1874–1946), judge of the New York Court of Appeals and of the New York Appellate Division for the Fourth Department
- David S. Cunningham III (fl. 1980s–2020s), Los Angeles County Superior Court judge
- H. S. Cunningham (1832–1920), judge of the Calcutta High Court
- John Cunningham (Nova Scotia judge) (fl. 1761–1785), Canadian judge and politician
- Joy Cunningham (born 1951/1952), associate judge of Cook County Circuit Court
- Tiffany P. Cunningham (born 1976), judge of the United States Court of Appeals for the Federal Circuit
- William Tharp Cunningham (1871–1952), judge of the Louisiana 11th Judicial District Court

== See also ==
- Justice Cunningham (disambiguation)
