= Howard Cunningham =

Howard Cunningham may refer to:

- Howard Cunningham (computer programmer) (born 1949), American computer programmer
- Howard Cunningham (Happy Days), fictional character played by Tom Bosley on the 1970s sitcom Happy Days

== See also ==
- Cunningham (disambiguation)
