= REO Royale =

American luxury car (1931–1935)

1931 REO Royale
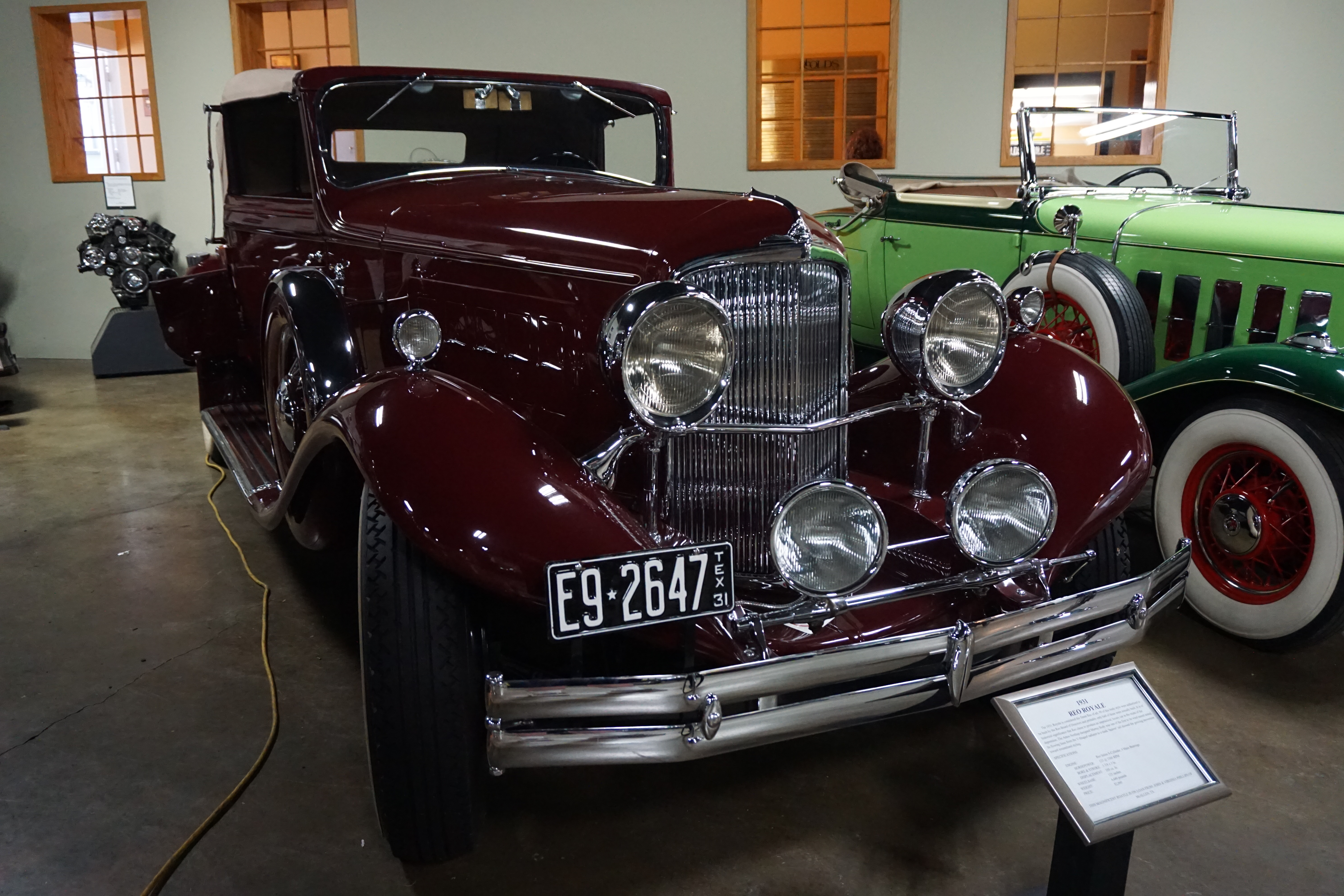
- 1931 REO Royale car

Overview
- Manufacturer: REO Motor Car Company
- Model years: 1931–1935
- Assembly: Lansing, Michigan

Body and chassis
- Class: Full-size luxury car
- Body style: Roadster; Convertible; Two-door coupe; Four-door sedan
- Layout: Front engine, rear drive

Powertrain
- Engine: 358 cubic inches (5.9 L) REO straight-8 engine 268 cubic inches (4.4 L) REO straight-6 engine
- Transmission: 3-speed manual transmission

Dimensions
- Wheelbase: 131 in (3,327 mm) (Model 8-31); 135 in (3,429 mm) (Model 8-35)

The REO Royale is a luxury automobile produced by the REO Motor Car Company of Lansing, Michigan during the 1931–1935 model years. Introduced as the company’s flagship model amid the Great Depression, it featured advanced engineering and pioneered streamlined styling by Amos Northup of the Murray Corporation of America. Editor of the Standard Catalog of American Cars, Beverly Rae Kimes, described it as “the most fabulous Reo of all.” The eight-cylinder models are recognized as Full Classics by the Classic Car Club of America (CCCA), particularly the 8-35 and longer-wheelbase variants.

Named for its founder, Ransom E. Olds, the REO had previously focused on quality mid-priced cars and trucks. The Royale represented an ambitious move into the luxury market, with significant investment in development. Production was limited due to economic conditions, and REO exited passenger-car manufacturing after 1936 to concentrate on trucks.

== Design and styling ==
The Royale is widely regarded as one of the earliest American production cars to be considered truly streamlined. Styled by Amos Northup (with assistance from Julio Andrade) at Murray, its design featured a distinctive V-shaped grille with thermostatically controlled radiator shutters (20 vertical louvers), flowing fenders that blended into the body, a raked windshield, and a smoothly integrated rear deck that concealed the fuel tank. Elements of the grille and body were patented. A plaster model was reportedly tested in a Michigan wind tunnel, an early use of such testing for a U.S. passenger car.

Body styles included four-door sedans, Victorias, coupes (including rumble-seat versions), and convertible coupes. Bodies were primarily supplied by Murray; a small number of custom coachbuilt examples (including by Dietrich) were produced on longer chassis. The design influenced later automotive styling and was praised contemporaneously for its modernity and elegance.

== Engineering and specifications ==
Early Royales were powered by a REO-designed L-head (side-valve) straight-eight engine of 357.8–358.0 in^{3} (5,863–5,867 cm^{3}), approximately 5.9 L, displacement, producing 125 horsepower at around 3,300–3,500 rpm. The engine featured a nine-main-bearing crankshaft, one-shot chassis lubrication, and other refinements for smoothness and durability. Top speed was approximately 90 mph (140 km/h), competitive with contemporary Packard and Cadillac models.

Factory wheelbases were:

- 131 inches (3,300 mm) for the Model 8-31
- 135 inches (3,400 mm) for the Model 8-35
- Longer custom versions: approximately 148–152 inches (3,800–3,900 mm) for Model 8-52 and Dietrich-bodied cars

Other features included hydraulic brakes, a three- or four-speed manual transmission with freewheeling on some models), and REO’s patented "silent second" gear. From 1933, an optional semi-automatic “Self-Shifter” transmission was offered; it proved unreliable and was criticized by contemporary consumer reports.

Prices for 1931–1932 models ranged from about $2,145 for the 8-31, to $2,745–$3,000 for 8-35 sedans and convertibles, with custom coachbuilt cars approaching $6,000. A convertible Victoria was listed at $3,195, though only one is known to have been built.

== Model years and evolution ==
- 1931–1933 (eight-cylinder models): Debuted for 1931 (introduced late 1930) as the Royale 35 / 8-31 / 8-35. The longer 8-35 and custom variants were the primary luxury offerings. Convertible coupes were rare (roughly 48–50 produced in 1932, with only a handful surviving). The eight-cylinder line was discontinued after 1933 due to low demand.
- 1934–1935 (six-cylinder models): The Royale name continued on lower-priced six-cylinder cars (new ~268–3736 cm³ / ~3.7 L engine producing around 85–95 hp). Wheelbases remained similar; prices dropped significantly (as low as $985 by 1935). The Self-Shifter remained available. Production of the 1935 Royale 75 was reported at 535 units.

Exact overall production figures for the Royale are not comprehensively documented in public sources, but total REO car output was modest in these years (e.g., around 3,900 in 1932 overall). Survivors of the eight-cylinder models, especially open cars, are rare and highly valued by collectors.

== Gallery ==

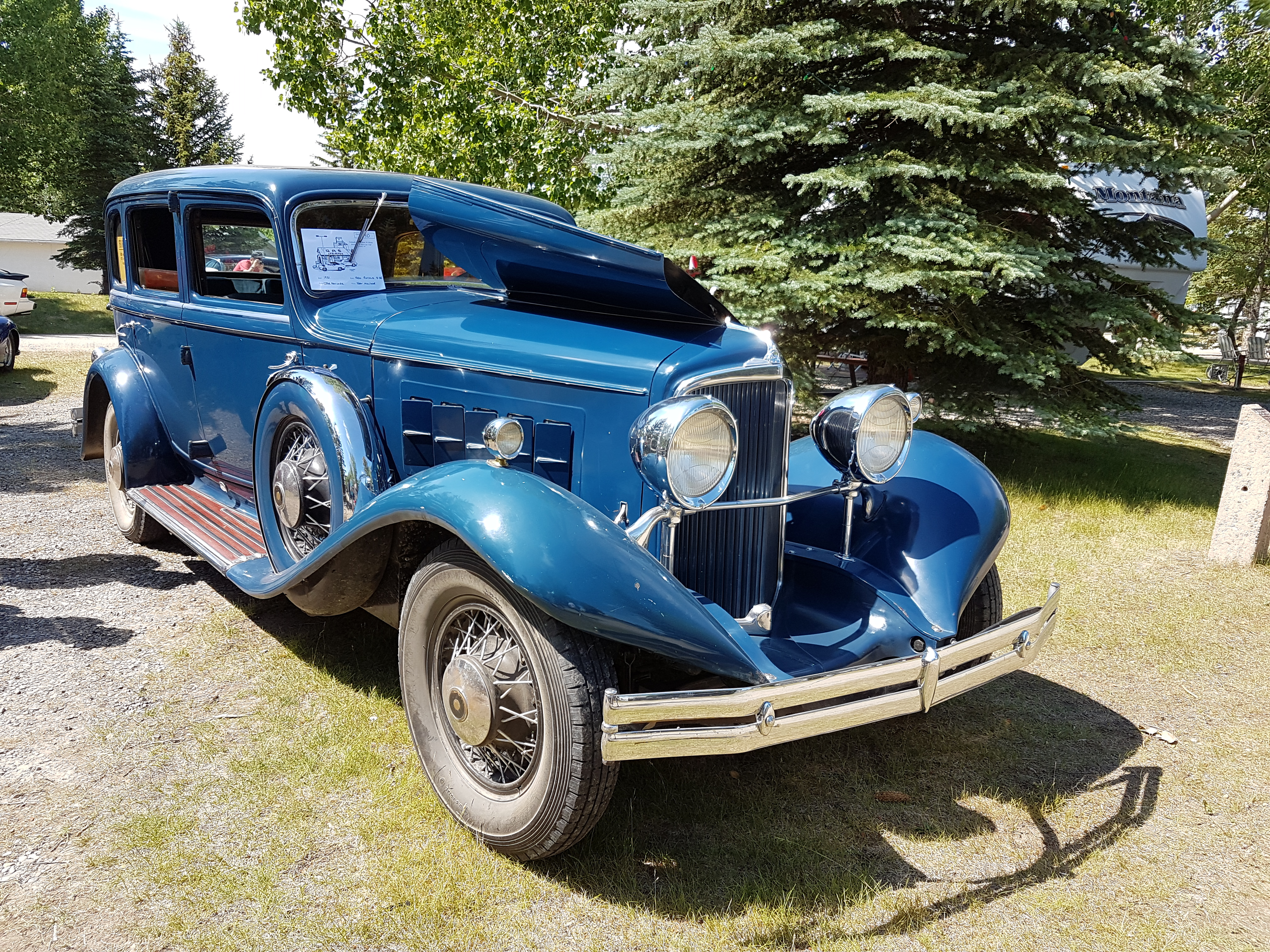

== Legacy ==
Despite critical acclaim for its design and engineering, the Royale could not overcome the economic pressures of the Depression. REO’s passenger-car production ended in 1936. Surviving examples are prized among classic-car enthusiasts for their advanced features, elegant styling, and status as CCCA Full Classics (8-35 and 8-52). They appear at major concours and auctions, with restored convertible coupes having sold for hundreds of thousands of dollars.

The Royale is frequently cited in automotive histories as a high point of independent American manufacturer achievement in the early 1930s and an important step toward modern streamlined design.

== Notes ==
- Spelling varies between “REO” (all capitals, reflecting the founder’s initials) and “Reo.”
- Some sources note minor discrepancies in exact engine displacement (357.8 vs. 358 cu in) and horsepower ratings depending on the year and testing conditions.
- The Self-Shifter’s development costs were substantial and contributed to REO’s financial difficulties.
