= Cunningham Car Company =

American automobile manufacturer

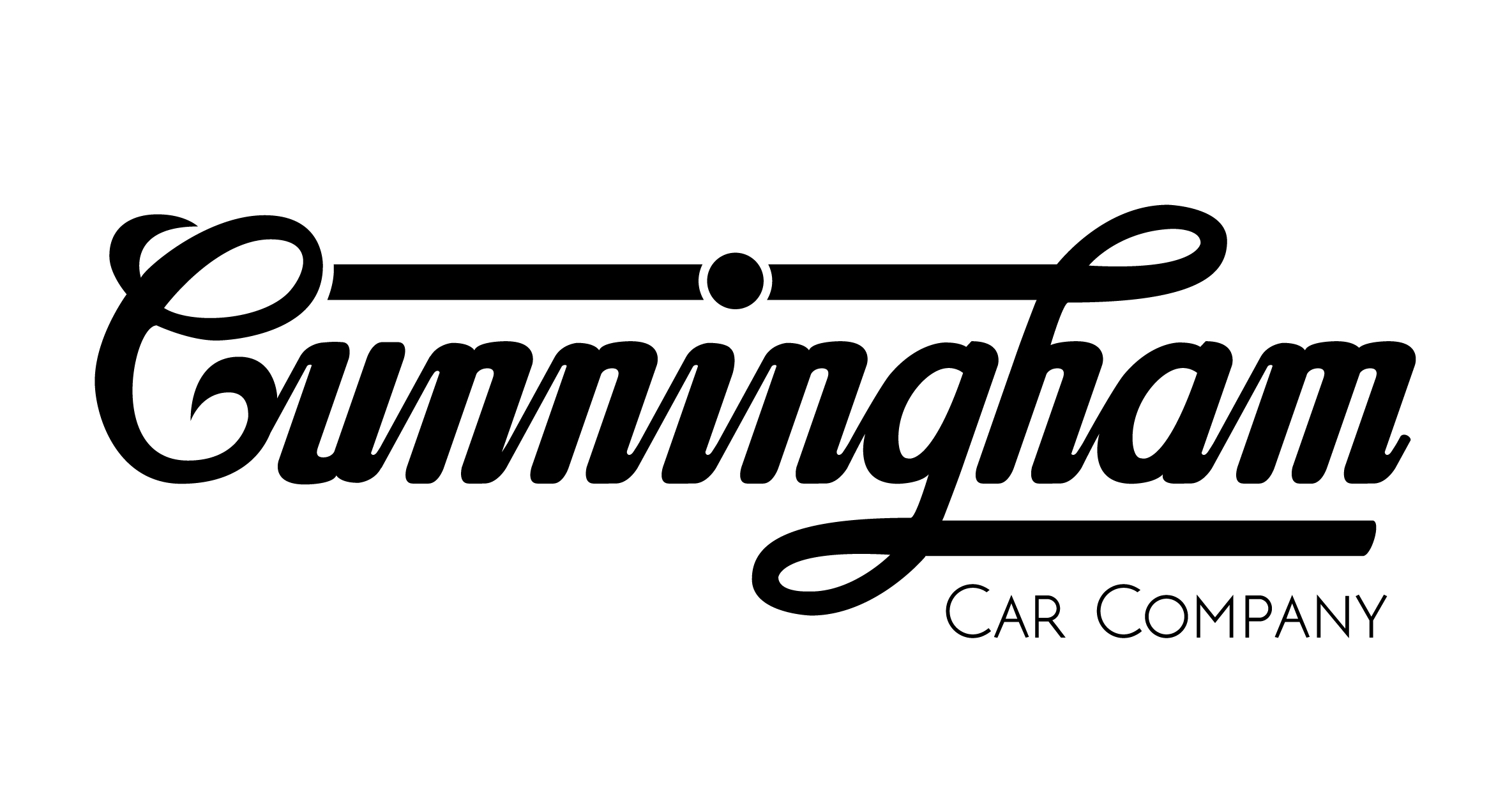

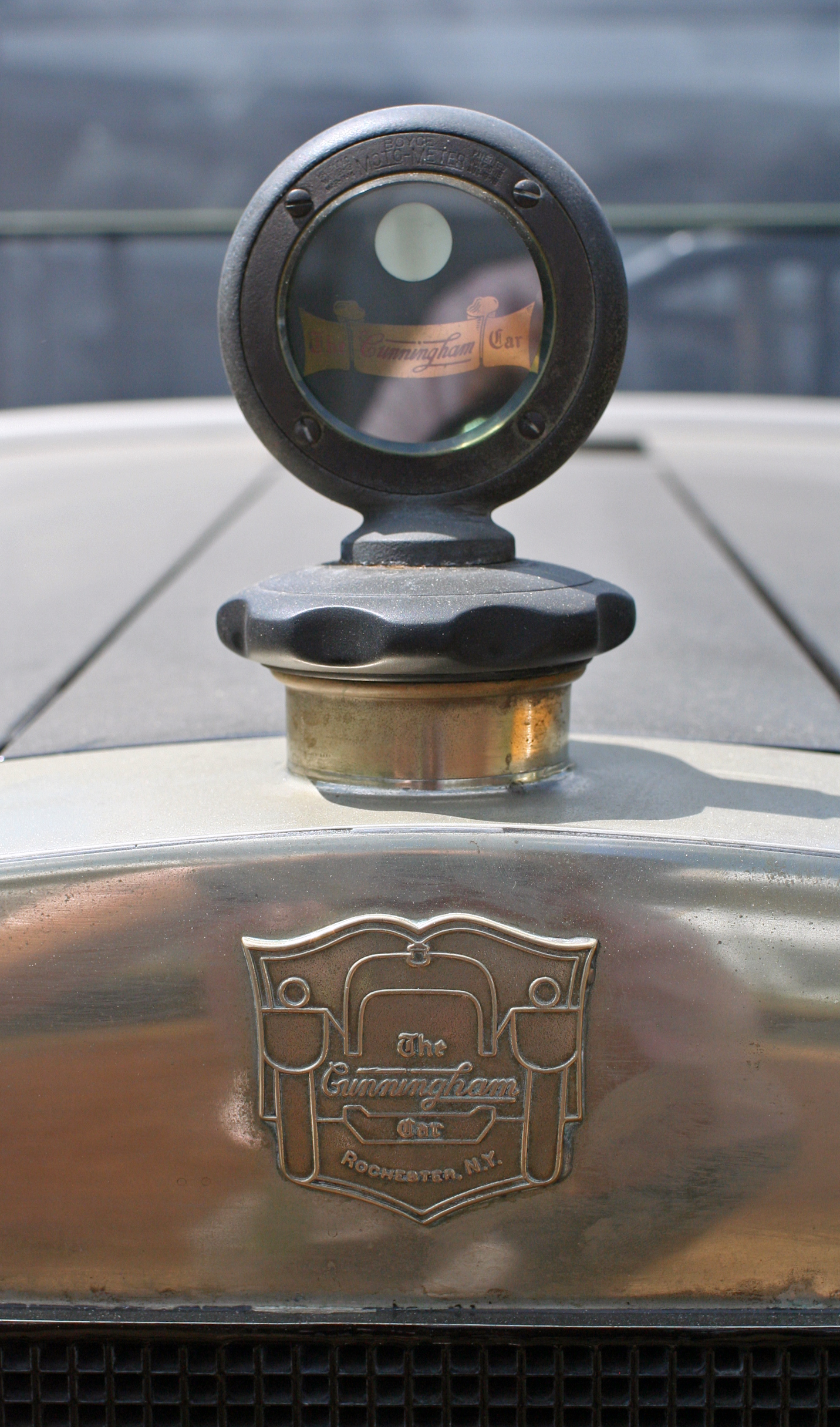
- Industry: Automotive
- Founder: James Cunningham
- Fate: Sold to Gleason Corporation

Cunningham (1919)

The Cunningham Car Company (not connected with the Cunningham Steam Wagon or Briggs Cunningham's cars) was a pioneering American production automobile manufacturer. Theirs was one of the earliest vehicles of the automotive age. Cunninghams were produced from 1896 to 1931 in Rochester, New York by James Cunningham, Son and Company who had been in the carriage manufacturing business since 1836.

== Early history ==
Foreseeing the necessity to switch to the production of horseless carriages, Cunningham started automobile production in 1908 with gasoline engine cars that sold at approximately $3,500, a very high price at the time. Initially the company made only the chassis. They assembled each car to individual customer requirements, using components from other manufacturers. Engines came from Buffalo or Continental. Cunningham also sold electric cars based on their experimental vehicle from the 1890s. By 1910, the company was producing all its parts and selling its cars in the range of $4,500 to $5,000.

== The big four-cylinder cars ==
From 1911 Cunningham offered complete automobiles that were illustrated in its first catalogue. They were hand-built and production was slow: one and a half cars per worker per year from a workforce of 450. Much of the wood- and metal-work was crafted by hand.

The first of these cars was the model J, a very large automobile with a Cunningham-built 4-cylinder engine of 40 HP. Wheelbase was 124 in. There were four bodies: a 7-passenger touring car at $3,500, a runabout at $3,250, and a limousine and a landaulet at $4,500 each. For 1912, the model J was offered without much changes. Choice of bodies went up to seven and included three additional open body styles: a 5-passenger phaeton, a 4-passenger torpedo and a 4-passenger toy tonneau, each at $3,500. Prices for the other models remained unchanged.

In 1913, the new model M superseded the J and had a slightly less powerful engine rated at 36.1 HP. Its chassis had the same wheelbase as previously. There was a little shuffling with the body styles as the phaeton and torpedo were listed for 5 passengers now. Again, there were seven body styles but the toy tonneau had gone and a new 7-passenger "Berlin Limousine" joined the range. Prices remained the same with the exception of the two limousine types whose prices rose to $4,600.

The main change in the model R that appeared in 1914 was a wheelbase of 129 in. Listed body styles were reduced to six. The torpedo and the "Berlin Limousine" were dropped. There were now three touring cars (for 4, 5, or 7 passengers). Prices rose considerably. The runabout was catalogued at $3,500, the tourers at $3,750, and the limousine and landaulet at $5,000

The Model S, built from 1915 until 1916, was the last of the big four-cylinder Cunninghams. Technically, these cars were quite similar to the model R. Body styles and prices remained unchanged. For 1916, the 5-passenger touring car was dropped.

== The Cunningham V8 ==
From the outset, Cunningham automobiles were admired for their clean lines. A radiator shell of Nickel silver was included, and a feature seen on many of these cars was the use of aluminum steps instead of running boards, adding another European touch to the car.

A V8 engine was developed in 1916 and introduced in the series V-1 Cunningham. A side-valve design with a displacement of 442 c.i., it was rated at 45 hp by the National Automobile Chamber of Commerce (NACC).

Cunningham bought many components from outside vendors. For example, the series V's clutch and transmission came from Brown-Lipe-Chapin, axles and rear-wheel brakes from Timken-Detroit, pistons from Lynite, and an electrical system from Westinghouse.

Roads were bad and Cunninghams were equipped with an air pump for easier repair of punctured tires. As there was no service network for the company, and owners did not wish to let local mechanics repair their expensive cars, Cunningham sent its own experts to their customers.

Series V Cunninghams had a wheelbase of 132 inches. Twelve body styles were listed in its first year. Open types—five- and seven-passenger touring cars, a new two-passenger roadster, a three-passenger runabout and a four-passenger toy tonneau—were priced at $3,750. There were three new closed styles at $4,500 each: a four-passenger coupé, a five-passenger sedan and a four-passenger roadster coupé. At $5,000 each, the four more formal styles (five-passenger touring sedan, six-passenger town car, and a limousine and a berline that both seated eight passengers) were the most expensive.

Individualizing these bodies added to the base prices. Cunningham invited its customers to commission their own bodywork, and assisted with design and execution. Such cars could easily cost twice as much as a comparable catalogued style.

Listed as 1917 models, these cars were available from 1916. They are among the earliest V8 engines built in the USA, after the Cadillac V8 model which was introduced in 1914.

Series V-2 started with model year 1918 and changes were few. Body styles were reduced to eight and prices increased, starting now at $4,250 for open-bodied cars. With the exception of a reintroduced Landaulet at $5,750, closed cars cost $5,500 each. Gone were the runabout, the roadster coupé, the touring sedan and, again, the toy tonneau. The roadster now seated four passengers, as did the smaller touring car. For 1919 the berline, town car and coupé styles were dropped. A special roadster became available to commemorate race car driver Ralph DePalma’s record-breaking run at Sheepshead Bay that year.

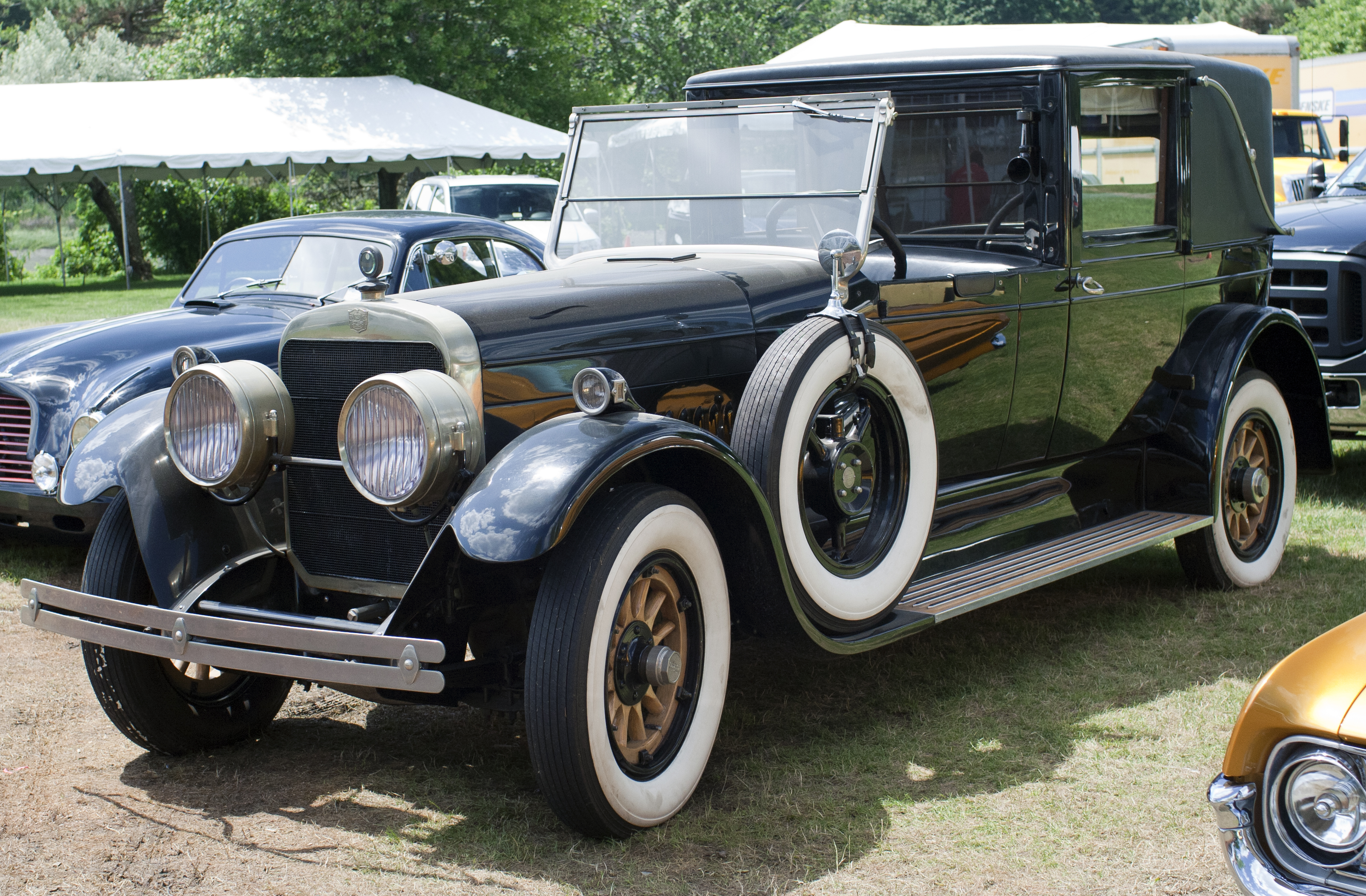
1922 Cunningham V4 Model 82-A Town Limousine

With the series V-3 that went into production in 1920 came many improvements. Most significant was a new engine, which had the same 442 c. i. displacement as before. There were 3 main bearings on each cylinder bench, and the counterweighted aluminium crankcase was cast in two parts. Pistons were cast iron and the oil pump was gear-driven. Transmission, again by Brown Lipe, had 4 speeds plus overdrive. Also available was an additional chassis with a wheelbase of 142 inches. Drum-type headlamps were introduced. There were three catalogued body styles on the 132-inch wheelbase, at substantially higher cost. Roadster and 4-passenger touring were $6,200, and the sedan cost $7,600. On the longer chassis, a 6-passenger touring car was available at $6,700. Three formal styles, called Inside Drive limousine, Town Limousine and Landaulet, priced at $8,100 each, were among the most expensive cars of the time. For 1921, there were few changes. Now, there were a touring car and three formal styles (one of them a Cabriolet convertible sedan) on the smaller chassis, with prices starting at $6,000. On the larger chassis, there were two touring cars at $6,700 and $6,800, and a town car and a cabriolet at $8,100 each.

For 1922, Cunningham no longer listed prices, only stating "Prices Upon Application". The cars now offered a four-speed manual transmission and coincidentally were called the series V-4. The Volney-Lacey designed 442 cu in (7.2 L) continued, with 45 hp according to the outdated NACC measuring method—for 1923, the rating was 90 bhp. The 132-inch (model 91A) and 142-inch (model 82A) wheelbases continued, with mostly Cunningham-built bodywork.

By 1926, the engine remained unchanged, and the cars were now equipped with four-wheel brakes.

== Racing ==
On November 17, 1919, Ralph DePalma drove a stripped but otherwise stock series V-3 Cunningham special roadster at 98 mph in a six-mile trial at the Sheepshead Bay Race Track.

== Production models ==
- Cunningham Inside-Drive Limousine-146-A

== See also ==
- Cunningham-Hall Aircraft Corporation
