= T1 light tank =

T1 light tank / T1 Cunningham
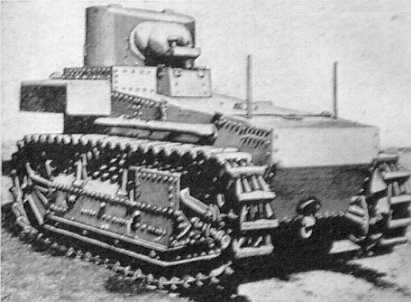
- A T1E1 light tank
- Type: Light tank
- Place of origin: United States

Service history
- In service: Prototype only
- Used by: United States of America

Production history
- Designer: U.S. Army, Ordnance Department
- Designed: 1927
- Manufacturer: James Cunningham, Son and Company (Rochester, New York)
- Produced: Prototypes only 1927–1932
- No. built: 6
- Variants: T1 prototype, T1E1, T1E2, T1E3, T1E4, T1E5, T1E6

Specifications
- Mass: T1: 7.5 short tons (6.8 t); T1E1: 8.3 short tons (7.5 t) 4.62 without modules T1E2: 8.9 short tons (8.1 t); T1E3: 8.5 short tons (7.7 t); T1E4: 8.6 short tons (7.8 t); T1E6: 9.95 short tons (9.03 t)
- Length: T1: 12 ft 6 in (3.810 m); T1E1, T1E2, T1E3: 12 ft 8 1/2 in (3.874 m); T1E4: 15 ft 5 in (4.699 m)
- Width: T1, T1E1, T1E3: 5 ft 10 1/2 in (1.791 m); T1E2: 6 ft 2 in (1.880 m); T1E4: 7 ft 2 3/4 in (2.203 m)
- Height: T1: 7 ft 1 1/2 in (2.172 m); T1E1, T1E3: 7 ft 1 5/8 in (2.175 m); T1E2: 7 ft 6 1/2 in (2.299 m); T1E4: 6 ft 6 3/4 in (2.000 m)
- Crew: Two (commander/gunner, driver)
- Armor: T1, T1E1: 0.25–0.375 in (6.4–9.5 mm); T1E2, T1E3, T1E4: 0.25–0.625 in (6.4–15.9 mm); T1E6: 0.375–0.625 in (9.5–15.9 mm)
- Main armament: T1, T1E1: 37 mm M1918 short tank gun T1E2, T1E3: 37 mm semi-automatic long-barreled Browning; T1E4, T1E6: 37 mm semi-automatic M1924; T1HMC: 75mm M1 howitzer
- Secondary armament: .30 caliber (.30-06 Springfield) M1919 Browning machine gun (coaxial) (Except T1HMC)
- Engine: Gasoline, water-cooled. Most T1 variants: Cunningham V8. T1E6: American-LaFrance V12. T1: 105 hp (78 kW); T1E1: 110 hp (82 kW); T1E2, T1E3: 132 hp (98 kW); T1E4, T1E5: 140 hp (100 kW); T1E6: 244 hp (182 kW)
- Suspension: T1, T1E1, T1E2: Equalizing links with four 2-wheel bogies, no springs T1E3: Coil springs with four 2-wheel bogies T1E4, T1E6: Semielliptic leaf springs with two articulated 4-wheel bogies
- Operational range: T1: 65 mi (105 km); T1E2, T1E3: 75 mi (121 km)
- Maximum speed: T1: 20 mph (32 km/h); T1E1: 18 mph (29 km/h); T1E2: 16 mph (26 km/h); T1E3: 21.9 mph (35.2 km/h); T1E4, T1E6: 20 mph (32 km/h)

The T1 light tank was a United States Army light tank of the late 1920s and early 1930s that was only built in prototype form. The tank was an Army design built by James Cunningham, Son and Company. Introduced in 1927, it was developed up through 1932 as a series of modified versions (T1E1, T1E2, T1E3, T1E4, T1E5, and T1E6). The tank was never mass-produced, nor was it ever used in combat.

== Design and variants ==
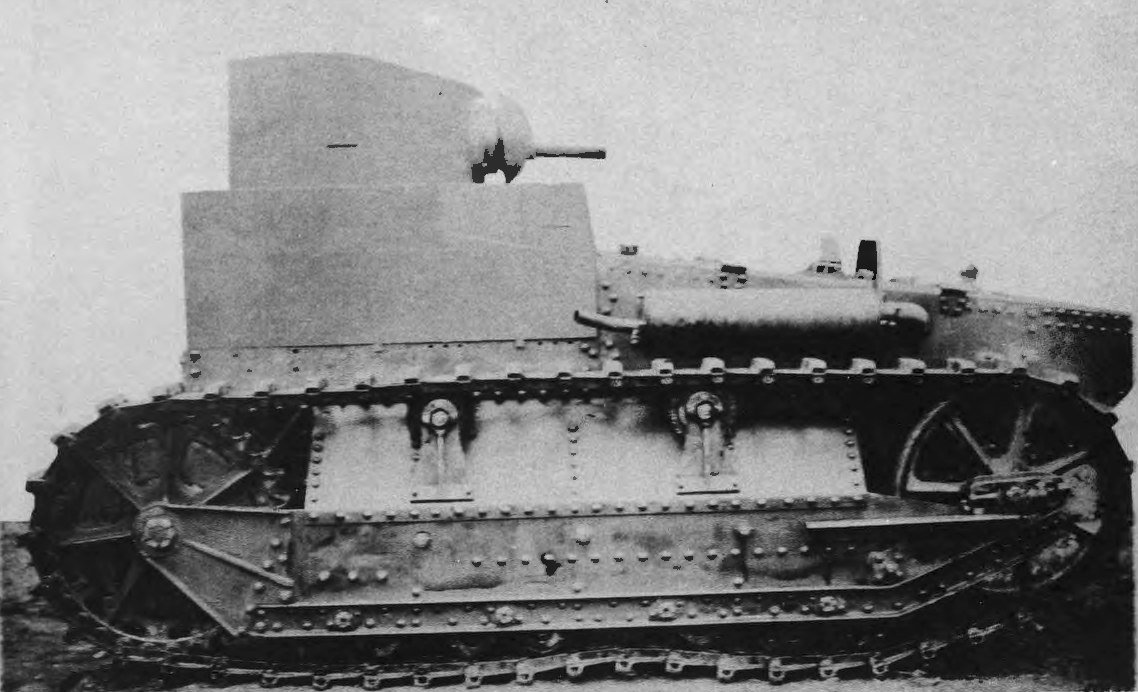
The original T1 prototype, shown here with a wooden mockup turret

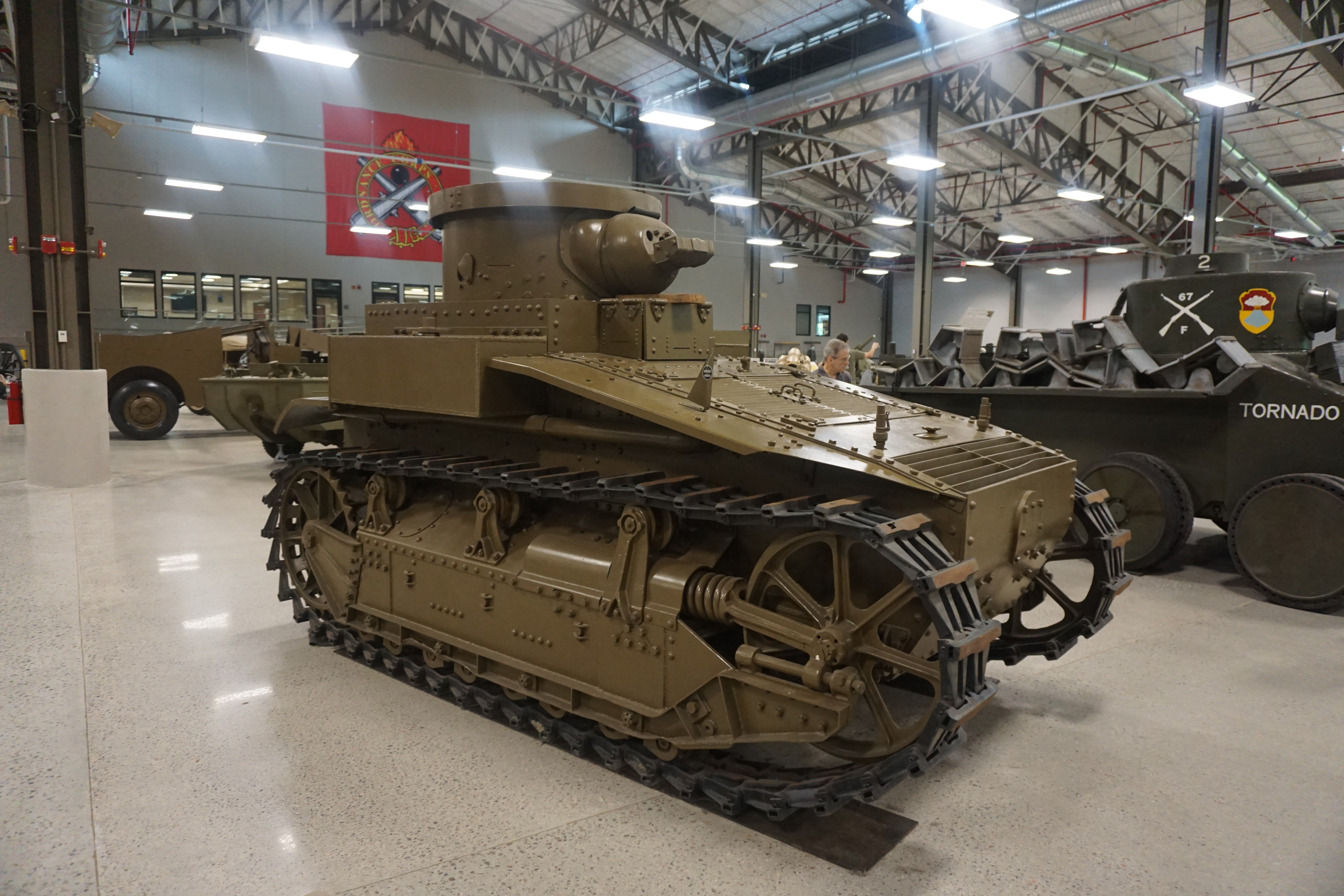
T1 light tank at the US Army Ordnance Training Support facility at Fort Gregg-Adams, VA

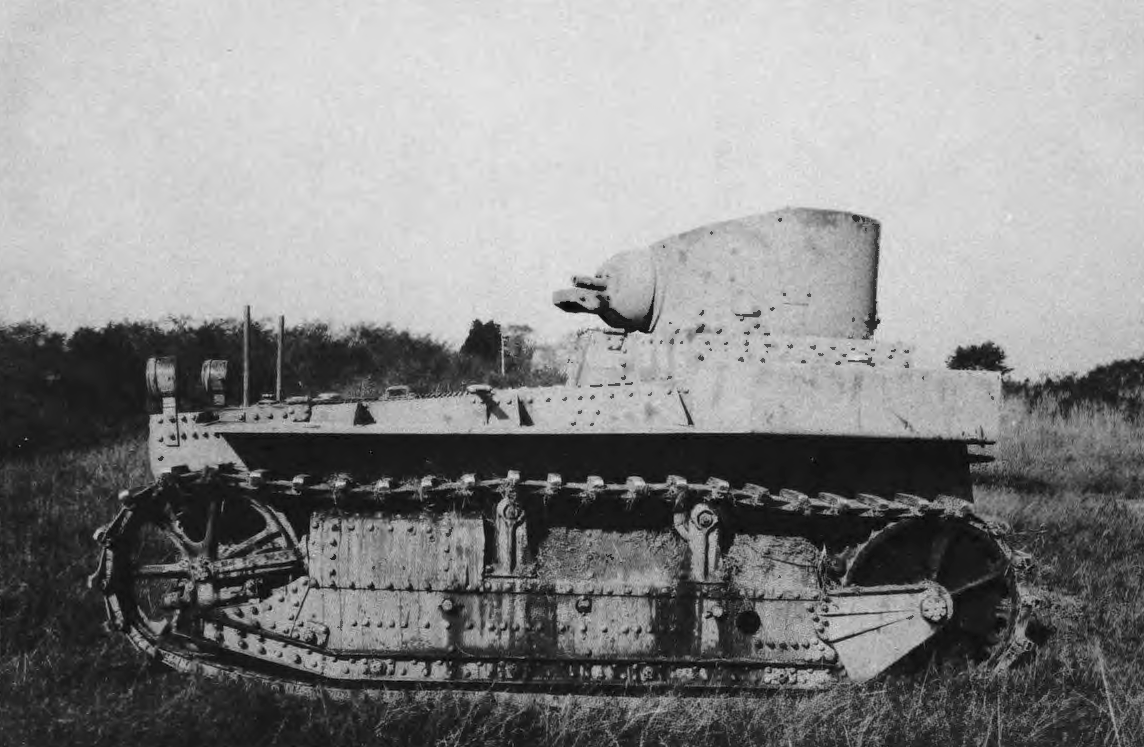
A T1E1 tank

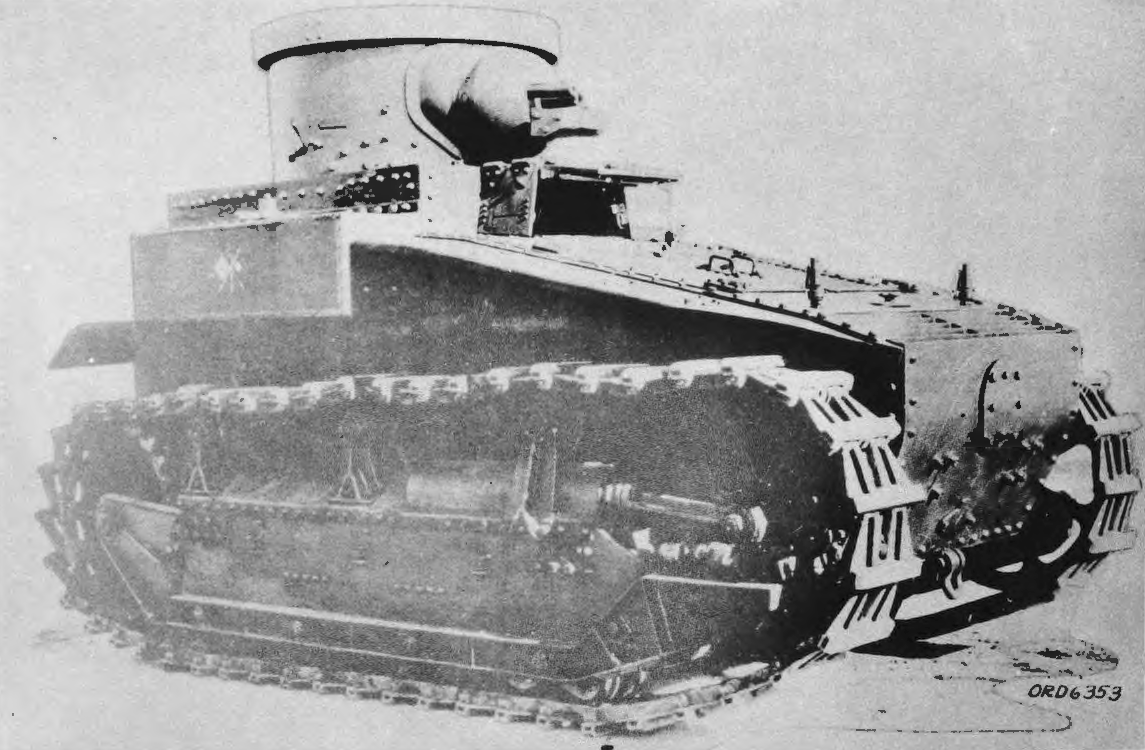
The T1E2, here equipped with the old M1916 gun

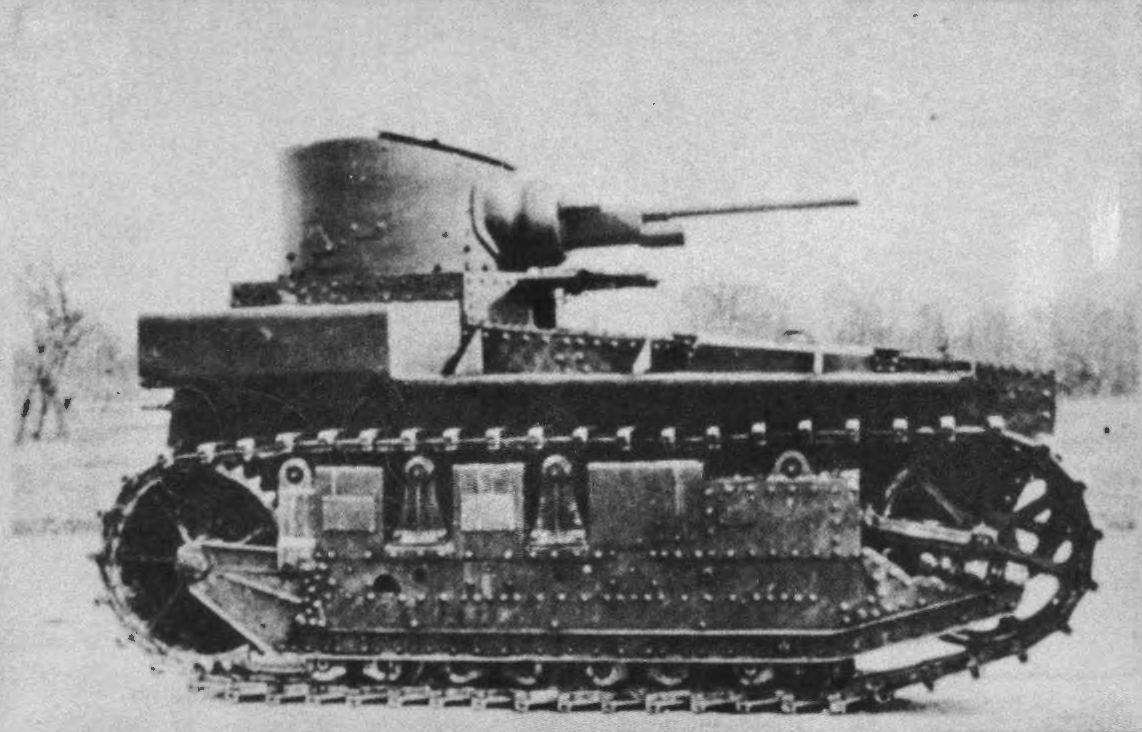
The T1E3, with the long-barreled Browning gun

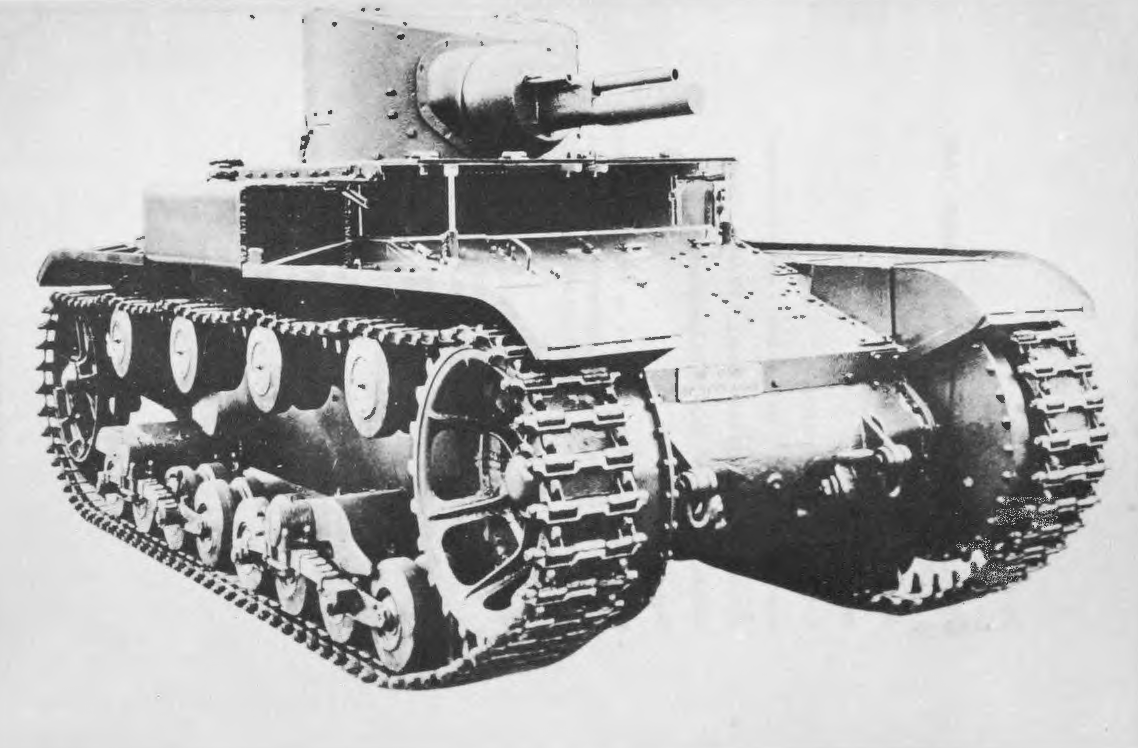
The central-turret T1E4

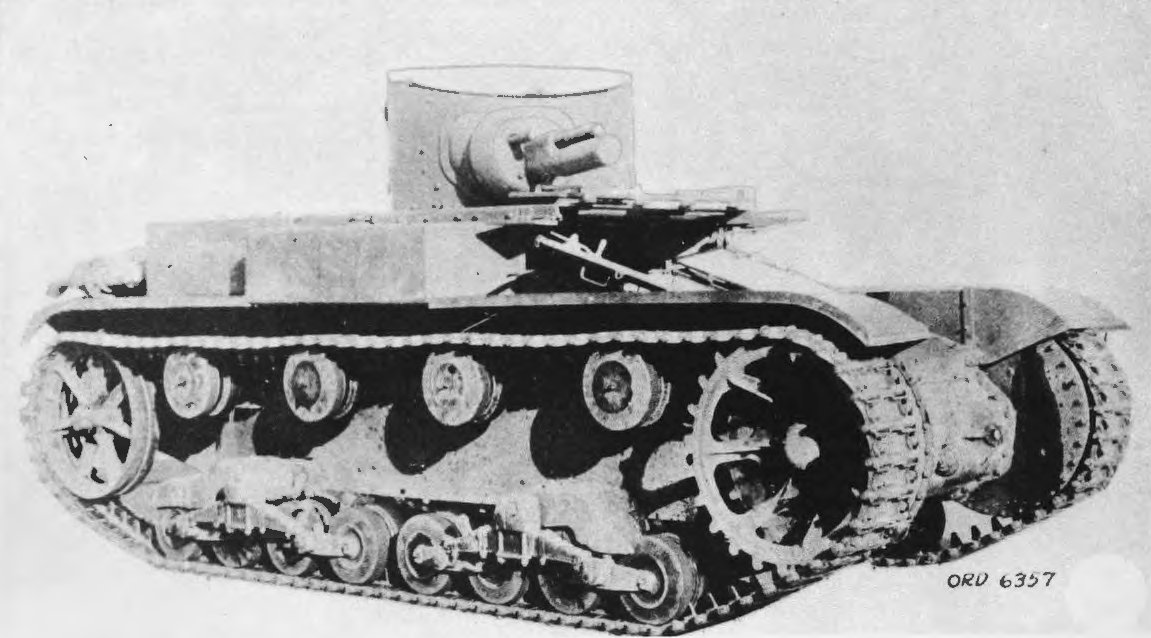
The T1E6, built by adding a larger V12 engine to the T1E4

Most versions of the T1 series of light tanks shared the same basic layout, with the engine mounted in the front and the turret, transmission and final drive all located in the rear. The exceptions were the T1E4 and T1E6, which moved the turret to the middle, the engine to the rear, and the transmission and final drive to the front, a configuration similar to later tanks. All T1 versions had a manually traversed turret armed with a 37 mm (1.46-inch) main gun and a coaxially mounted .30 caliber (7.62 mm) M1919 Browning machine gun, and all carried a crew of two: a commander who sat within the turret and worked the guns, and a driver seated just in front of the turret.

The single T1 prototype was built in 1927. Its main gun was a 37 mm M1918 short tank gun, a U.S. version of a French infantry support gun of World War I. This was a relatively low-velocity weapon, with a muzzle velocity of 1,200 ft/s (370 m/s). The tank's armor ranged from 0.25 in (6.4 mm) to 0.375 in (9.5 mm) in thickness, and the tank's overall weight was 7.5 short tons (6.8 metric tons). It was powered by a 105 hp (78 kW) Cunningham water-cooled V8 gasoline engine which gave it a top speed of 20 mph (32 km/h). The transmission, made by Cotta, was a sliding-gear type with three forward gears and one reverse gear. After the prototype was evaluated, it was stripped down to its chassis, which was reused to test other vehicle types.

The T1 prototype was followed in 1928 by the very similar T1E1. Four of these were built, making the T1E1 the only T1 version which was not built as a single prototype. The T1E1 was briefly standardized for production as the Light Tank, M1, but this was revoked after only a couple of months. The T1E1 had a few minor changes from the T1: the hull no longer projected forward of the tracks, and the fuel tanks were moved above the tracks. The top speed was reduced to 18 mph (29 km/h).

The next version, the T1E2, was built in 1929, again as a single prototype. It had heavier armor, varying from 0.25 in (6.4 mm) to 0.625 in (15.9 mm) thick, and the tank's weight rose to 8.9 short tons (8.1 metric tons). The Cunningham V8 engine had its power boosted to 132 hp (98 kW), giving the T1E2 a slightly higher power-to-weight ratio than its predecessors; despite this, the maximum speed was only 16 mph (26 km/h) because of changes in the gear ratios. The 37 mm main gun was changed to a long-barreled Browning semi-automatic type, having a much higher muzzle velocity of 2,000 ft/s (610 m/s), though later the old M1918 model was reinstalled.

In 1930 the Ordnance Department modified one of the T1E1 tanks to create the T1E3. In some ways this was a hybrid of the T1E1 and T1E2; it had the high-velocity long-barreled Browning gun, thickened armor, and more powerful engine of the T1E2, but it retained the hull, turret, dimensions, and transmission gear ratios of the T1E1. The T1E3 weighed 8.5 short tons (7.7 metric tons). Since it had the T1E2's more powerful engine and the T1E1 gearing, this gave it both a higher power-to-weight ratio and greater speed than any previous T1 version, with a maximum speed of 21.9 miles per hour (35.2 km/h). The most important feature of this version, however, was its suspension, which was completely redesigned. All previous T1 versions had a totally unsprung suspension which used multiple equalizing links between the bogies to spread out impacts from rough terrain. This still gave a very rough ride. The T1E3's suspension had coil springs and hydraulic shock absorbers, and its ride was much smoother.

The T1E4, introduced in 1932, was another alteration of a T1E1 tank. Its transformation was much more radical, however, because the vehicle's layout was completely changed. The engine was moved to the rear, the transmission and final drive to the front, and the turret to the middle of the body. At 15 ft 5 in (4.70 m) in length, the T1E4 was nearly a quarter longer than preceding T1 versions. The T1E4 also got a new suspension copied exactly from the British Vickers 6-Ton light tank, which the Army had recently tested. It featured semi-elliptic leaf springs and articulated four-wheel bogies. Harry Knox even dared to patent the vehicle, infringing on John Valentine Carden's patent from 1929. The main gun was replaced by the 37 mm semi-automatic gun M1924, whose muzzle velocity of 1,350 feet per second (410 m/s) was lower than that of the long-barreled Browning in the T1E2 and T1E3. The armor thickness was similar to the T1E2 and T1E3. The T1E4 had an overall weight of 8.6 short tons (7.8 metric tons). At first the T1E4 retained the engine from the T1E1, but this proved to be underpowered, so it was replaced by an improved Cunningham V8 producing 140 horsepower (104 kW), giving the T1E4 a top speed of 20 miles per hour (32 km/h).

The T1E5, introduced around the same time as the T1E4, was yet another conversion of a T1E1, in this case with a new steering system. All previous T1 versions used a simple clutch-brake steering system which led to a loss of power while turning. The T1E5 replaced this with a controlled differential steering system from the Cleveland Tractor Company (a so-called "Cletrac" system). The engine was also replaced with the same 140 hp (104 kW) version as in the T1E4. Testing showed the controlled differential steering to be clearly superior to the clutch-brake system, and the Ordnance Department recommended its use for all tracked vehicles that could exceed six mph (ten km/h).

The final T1 version produced, the T1E6, was introduced in 1932 as a further alteration of the T1E4. The Cunnigham V8 engine was replaced with a 244-horsepower (182 kW) V12 made by the American-LaFrance and Foamite Corporation. Even though the tank's weight increased to 9.95 short tons (9.03 metric tons), its more powerful engine gave it the best power-to-weight ratio of the entire T1 series. However, the maximum speed was still 20 miles per hour (32 km/h), and the larger V12 engine severely crowded the engine bay, making maintenance troublesome. The T1E6 kept the armament of the T1E4; the armor's maximum thickness remained unchanged, but the minimum thickness increased from 0.25 inches (6.4 mm) to 0.375 inches (9.5 mm).

== Preservation ==
The T1E2 has been preserved, though without its guns. Previously it was on outdoor display at the U.S. Army Ordnance Museum at Aberdeen Proving Ground in Aberdeen, Maryland. Due to that museum's closure in 2010, it has been moved to the U.S. Army Ordnance Training and Heritage Center at Fort Lee, Virginia, where it is presently in indoor storage and not publicly accessible.

== Sources ==
- Army Ground Forces, Board No. 2 (1 September 1947). Development of Armored Vehicles, Volume I: Tanks.
- Hunnicutt, R. P. (1992). Stuart, A History of the American Light Tank, Volume 1. Presidio Press. ISBN 0-89141-462-2.
- Jones, Ralph E.; Rarey, George H.; Icks, Robert J. (1933). The Fighting Tanks Since 1916. Washington, D.C.: National Service Publishing Company. hdl:2027/mdp.39015035242844.
