= Conyngham =

Conyngham may refer to:

== People ==
- Barry Conyngham (born 1944), Australian composer and academic
- Dalton Conyngham (1897–1979), South African cricketer
- Elizabeth Conyngham, Marchioness Conyngham (1769–1861), last mistress of King George IV of the United Kingdom
- Francis Conyngham, 2nd Marquess Conyngham (1797–1876), Irish soldier and politician
- Francis Conyngham, 2nd Baron Conyngham (c. 1725–1787), Irish politician
- George Conyngham, 3rd Marquess Conyngham (1825–1882), British peer and soldier
- Gustavus Conyngham (c. 1744–1819), Irish merchant sea captain, officer in the Continental Navy and privateer
- Henry Conyngham, 1st Marquess Conyngham (1766–1832), Irish politician, husband of Elizabeth Conyngham
- Henry Conyngham, 8th Marquess Conyngham (1951–2025), Irish politician
- Henry Conyngham, 1st Earl Conyngham 1705–1781), British Member of Parliament
- Henry Francis Conyngham, Earl of Mount Charles (1795–1824), Irish politician
- Henry Conyngham (soldier) (pre 1681–c. 1705), Irish soldier and Member of Parliament
- William Burton Conyngham (1733–1796), British Member of Parliament
- Conyngham Greene (1854–1934), British diplomat

== Places ==
- Conyngham, Pennsylvania
- Conyngham Township, Columbia County, Pennsylvania
- Conyngham Township, Luzerne County, Pennsylvania

== Other uses ==
- Marquess Conyngham, a title in the Peerage of Ireland
- SS Empire Conyngham (1899–1949)
- USS Conyngham, three U.S. Navy destroyers named after Gustavus Conyngham

== See also ==
- Coningham (disambiguation)
- Cunningham (disambiguation)
