= Coningham =

Coningham may refer to:

== People ==
- Arthur Coningham (cricketer) (1863–1939), Australian cricketer
- Arthur Coningham (RAF officer) (1895–1948?), Royal Air Force air marshal
- Robin Coningham (born 1965), British archaeologist and academic
- William Coningham (1815–1884), British Liberal politician and art collector

== Places ==
- Coningham Nature Recreation Area, a Protected areas of Tasmania, Australia
- Coningham, Tasmania, a locality in Australia
- Coningham (ward), an electoral ward in London, England

== See also ==
- Conyngham (disambiguation)
- Cunningham (disambiguation)
