= Knox Automobile Company =

Former American car manufacturer

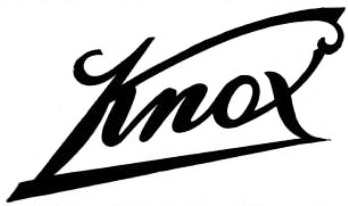
- The Car That Never Drinks

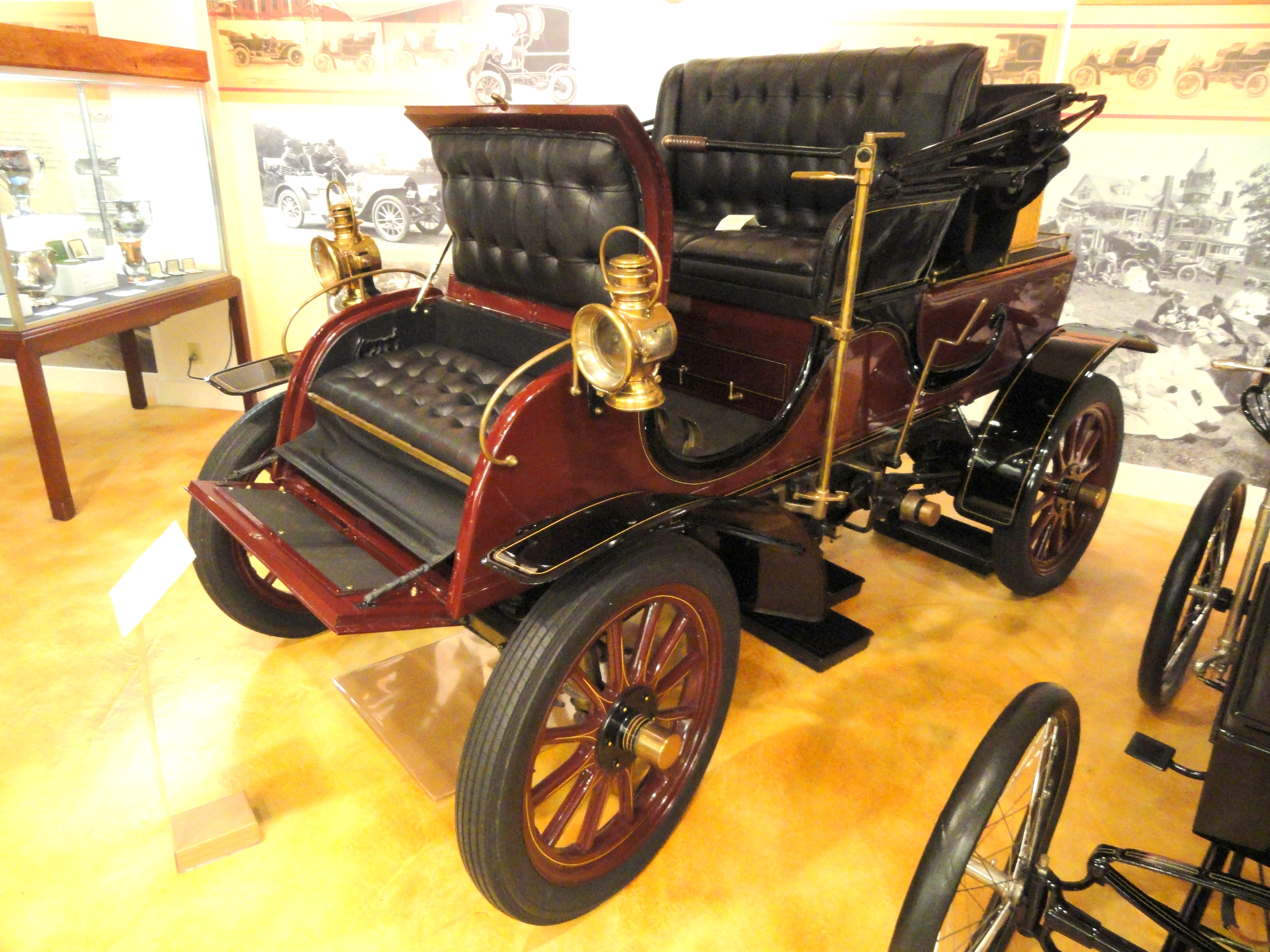
- 1904 Knox Touraine Runabout
- Industry: Automotive industry
- Founded: 1900; 126 years ago
- Defunct: 1915; 111 years ago, 1924; 102 years ago
- Fate: Bankruptcy
- Successor: Knox Motor Company
- Headquarters: Springfield, Massachusetts, United States
- Key people: Harry A. Knox, Elihu H. Cutler
- Products: Automobiles
- Production output: 10,835

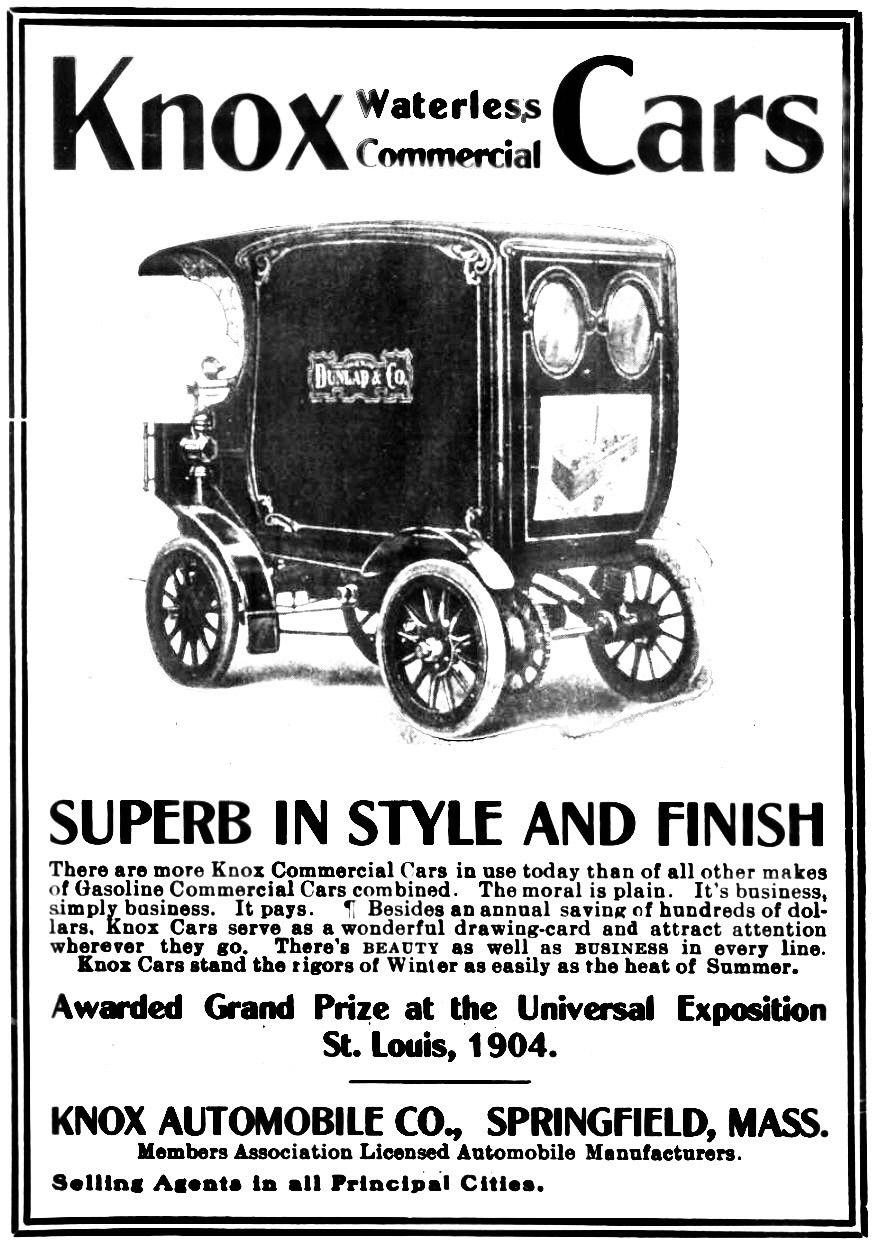
According to the 1905 advertisement, there are supposed to be more Knox commercial cars than from all the other manufacturers combined

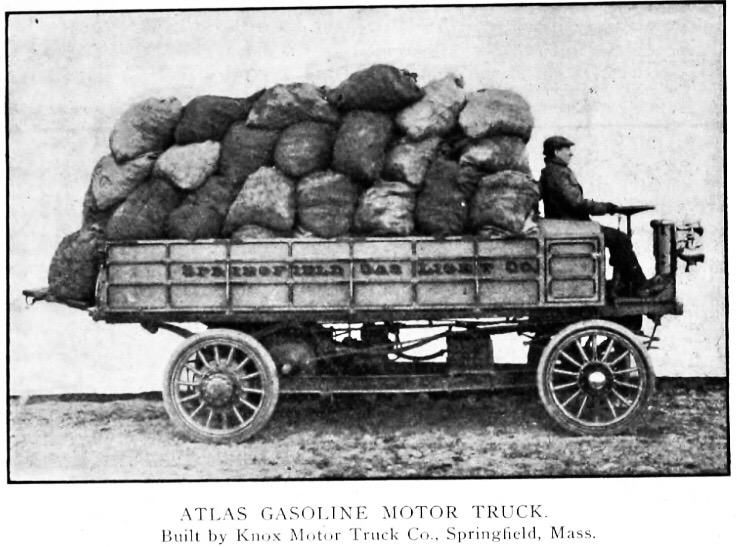
Knox „Atlas“ 3t (1905) 24 hp

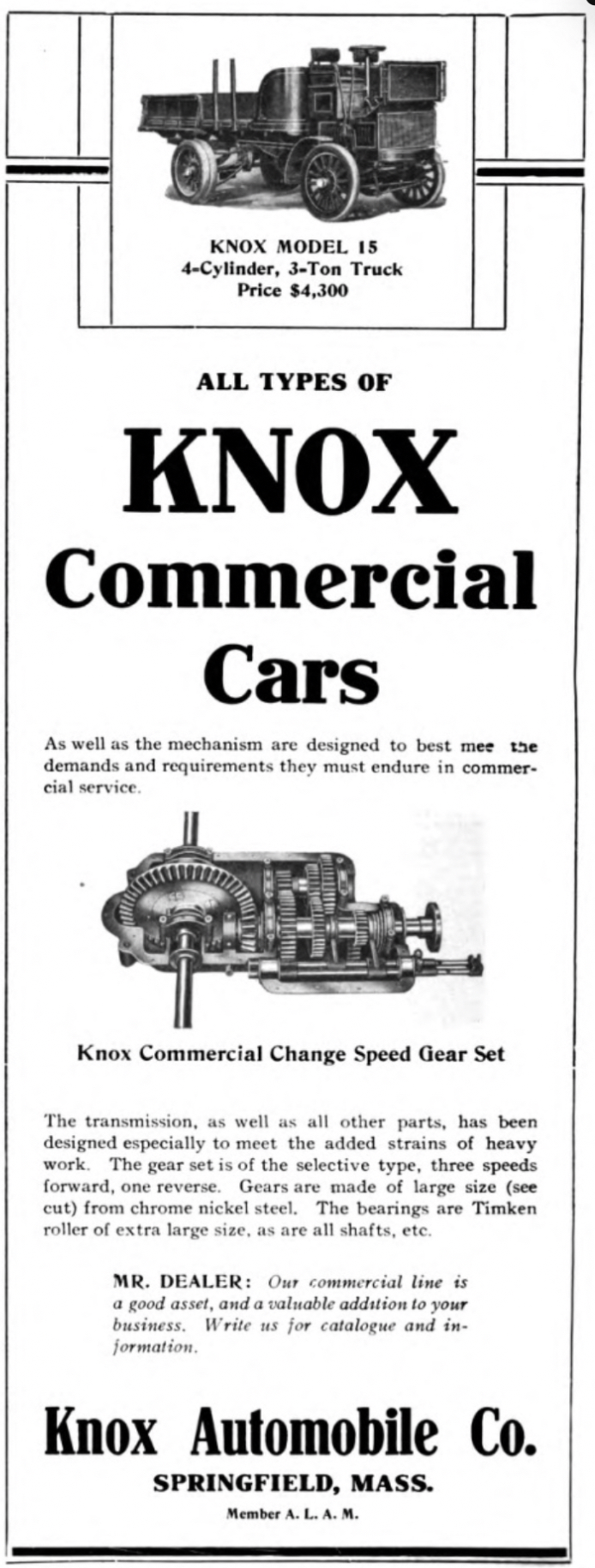
Knox Model 15 (1909)

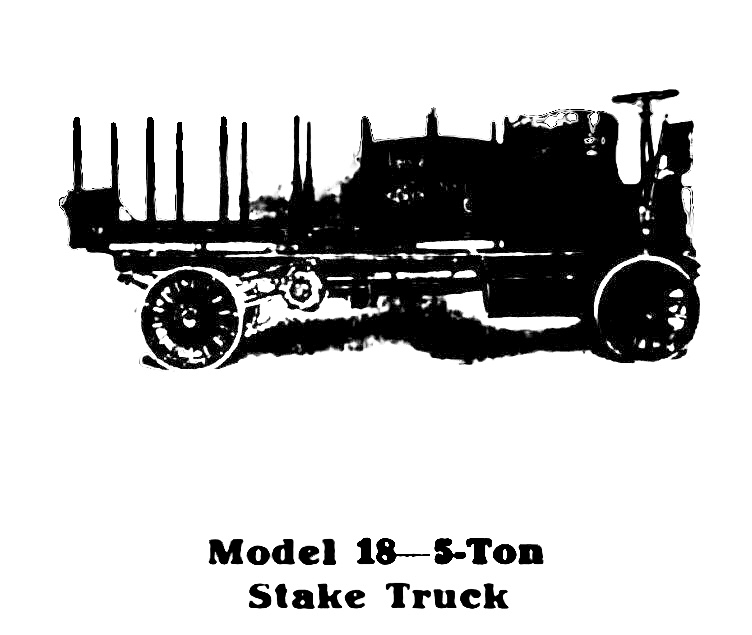
Knox Model 18 (1909)

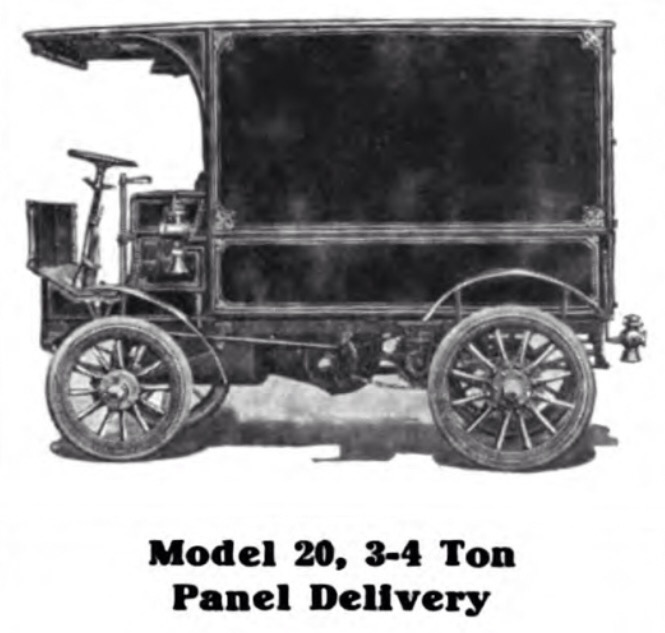
Knox Model 20 (1909)

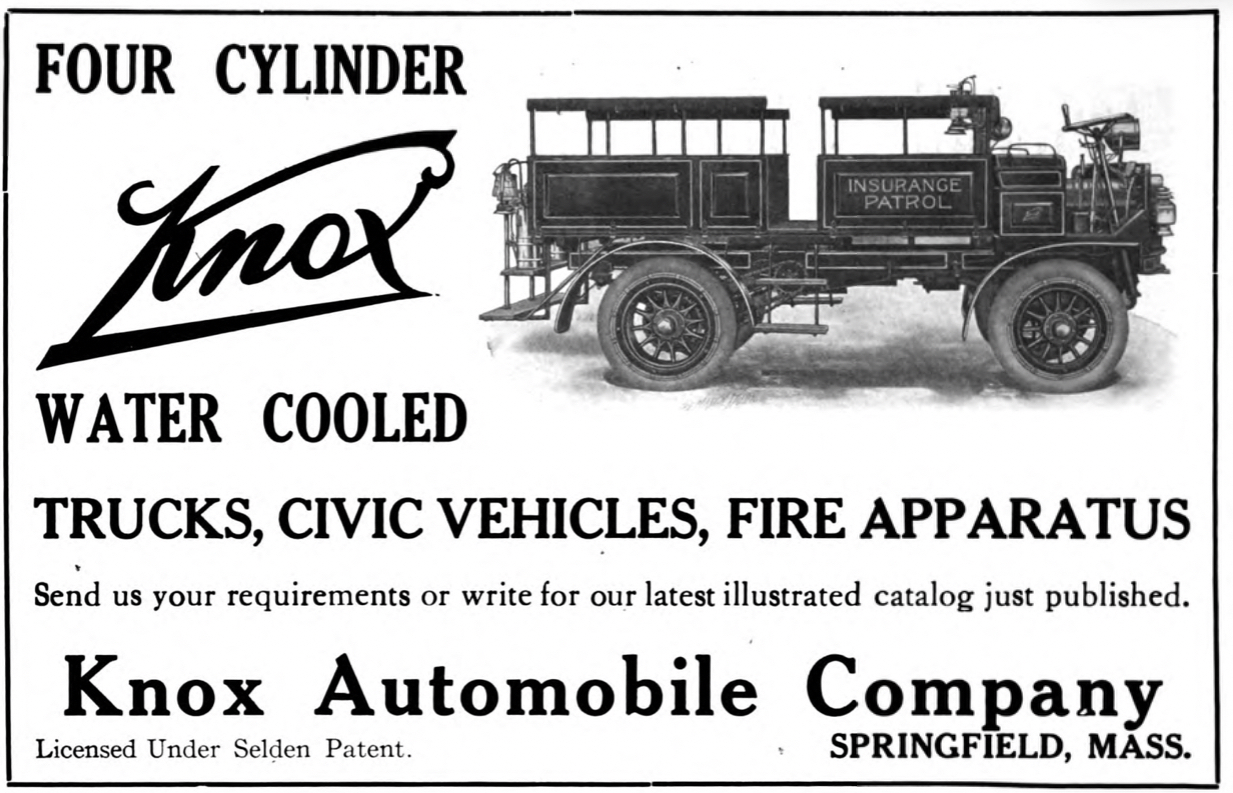
Knox Trucks (1910)

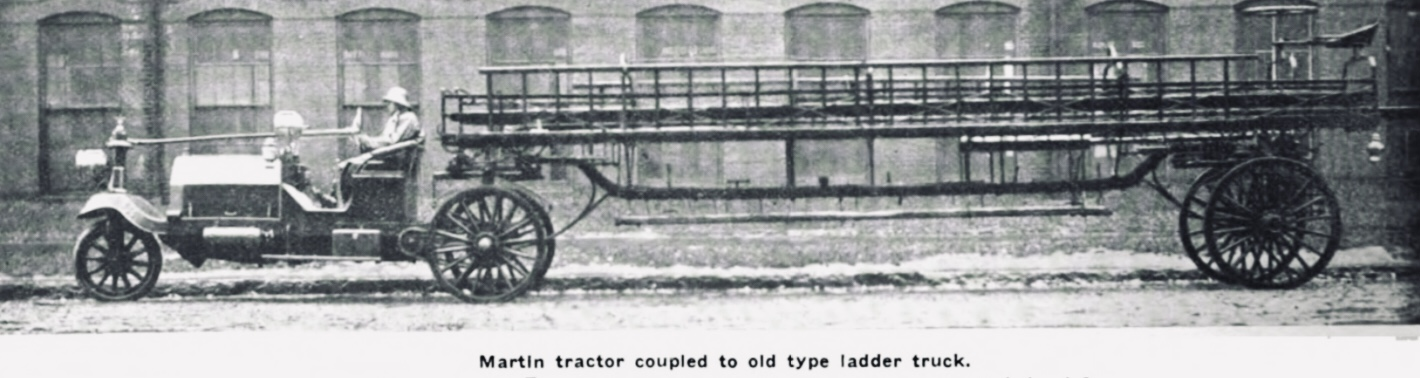
Knox-Martin ladder truck (1911)

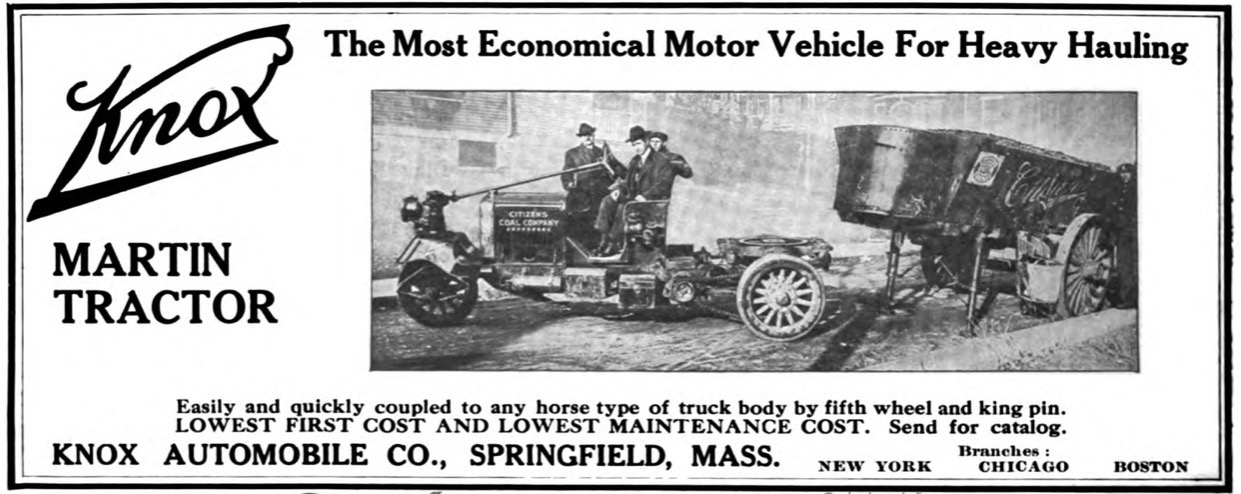
Knox Martin Tractor (1913)

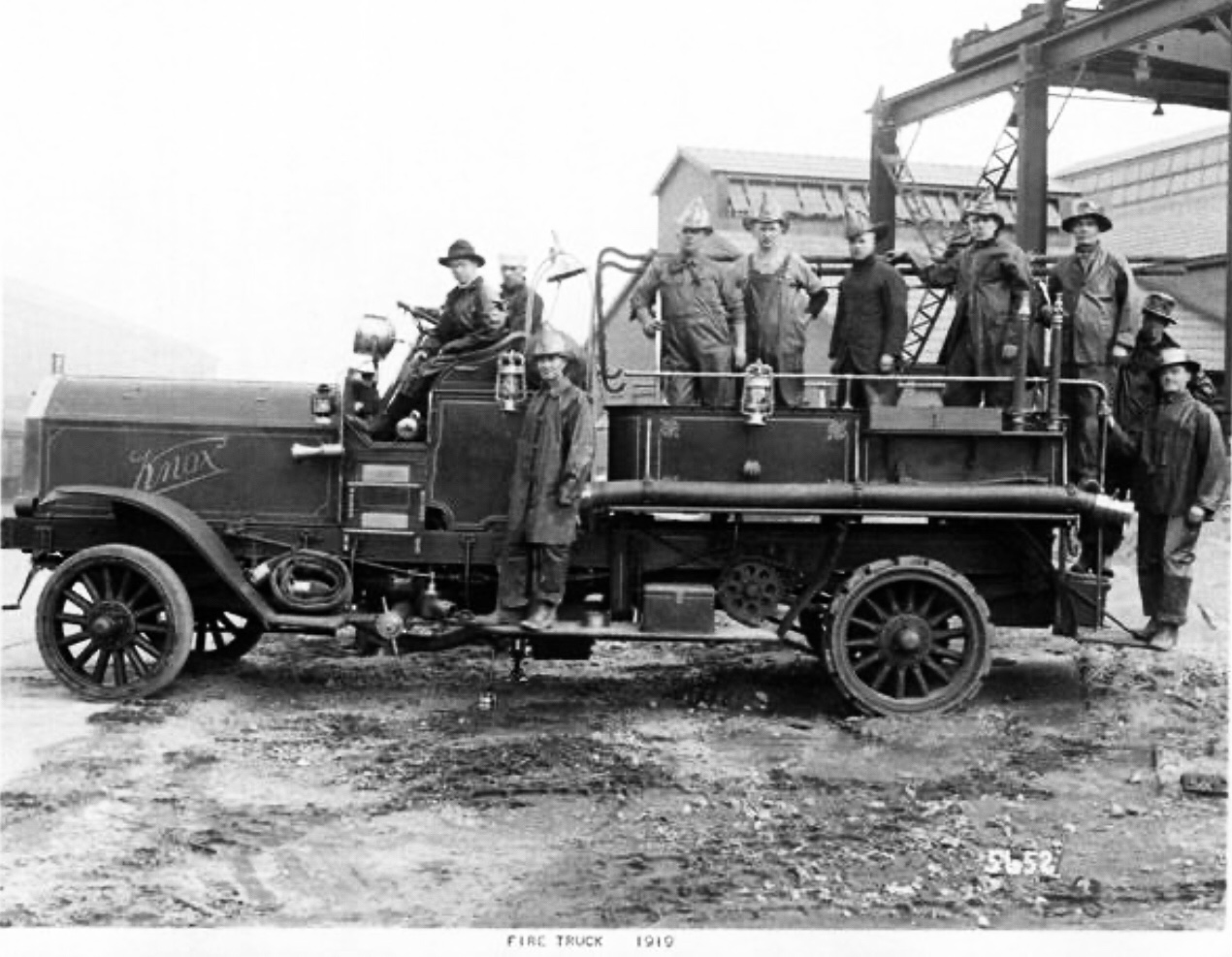
Knox fire truck (1919)

The Knox Automobile Company was a manufacturer of automobiles in Springfield, Massachusetts, United States, between 1900 and 1914. Knox also built trucks and farm tractors until 1924. They are notable for building the very first modern fire engine in 1905, and the first American vehicle with hydraulic brakes, in 1915.

== History ==
Harry Austin Knox built three experimental gasoline cars at Overman Wheel Company between 1895 and 1898. He left Overman when they decided to build a steam car. Knox joined with his former employer, Elihu H. Cutler of the Elektron Company to form the Knox Automobile Company in Springfield Massachusetts in 1900. The Waltham Watch Company factory was purchased and Knox built 15 cars in their first year.

The Knox Model A was a three-wheel runabout with a 5-hp one-cylinder air-cooled engine. In 1902 a four-wheel runabout and a 8-hp two-cylinder engine joined the model line-up. Early cars were called Knoxmobile with the Waterless Knox being used from 1903. A slogan used was "The Car That Never Drinks". In some models, passengers rode up front over the front axle while the driver and another passenger sat in the back over the engine.

=== The "Old Porcupine" engine ===
The flat-mounted single-cylinder engine was air-cooled. Rather than flanges to improve the efficiency of cooling, 1,750 threaded 3/16 inch (4.8 mm) diameter rods were screwed into the cylinder casing as projecting studs, which led to the engine sometimes being referred to as "Old Porcupine". A 2-speed planetary transmission was fitted. This engine was situated at the center of the car and produced 8 hp (6.0 kW). It was also called a "hedgehog". The one-cylinder engine was used until 1905. In 1902 a two-cylinder version was added that was used up to 1907.

=== Growth ===
Knox pricing for the one-cylinder and two-cylinder models went for a low price in 1900 of $750, (equivalent to $29,025 in 2025) to medium-priced by 1904. A 1904 Knox Tuxedo Touring model, equipped with a straight-twin engine producing 16 hp (12 kW), was priced at $2,200, equivalent to $78,833 in 2025.

In late 1904 Knox left the company over a disagreement on policy with Elihu Cutler. Knox set-up a new business across town to build the Atlas air-cooled car.

In 1906 Knox Automobile Company introduced the Model G, a 40-hp air-cooled four-cylinder engine on a 112-inch wheelbase. With a limousine body priced at $5,000 (equivalent to $179,167 in 2025), Knox had entered the luxury car market. The two-cylinder models were phased out in 1907 and all Knox's became mid-priced to high-priced cars. Knox progressively improved their models, moving the engine from under the seat to up front under a hood and going from chain-driven to shaft-drive.

In 1908 a water-cooled four-cylinder engine was introduced and customers could choose air-cooled or pay $100 more for water-cooled models. A six-cylinder engine became available in 1910 and all Knox's became water-cooled. Only luxury-priced Knox's were offered after 1910.

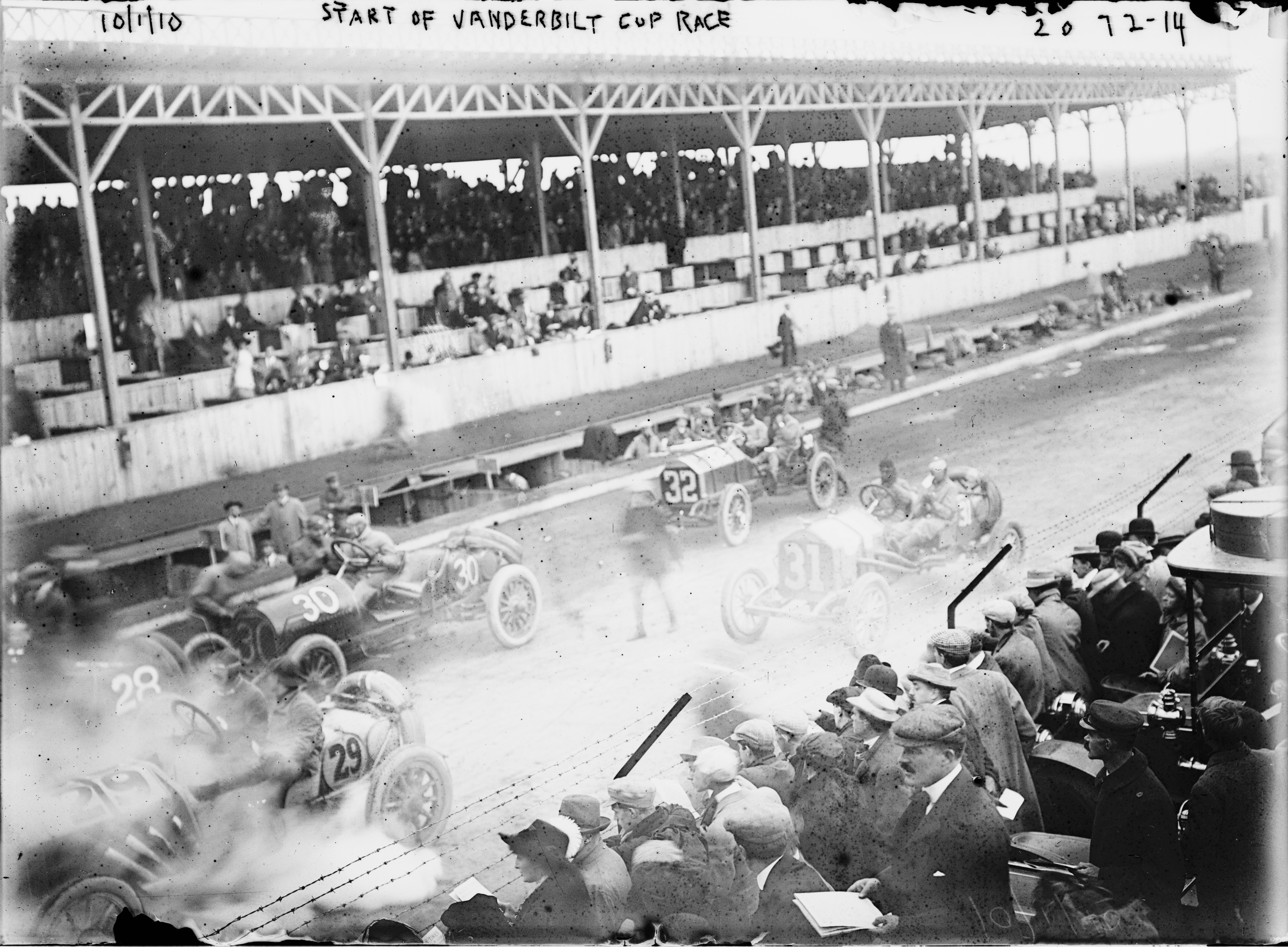
#32 Knox (USA) driven by Fred Belcher in the 1910 Vanderbilt Cup race

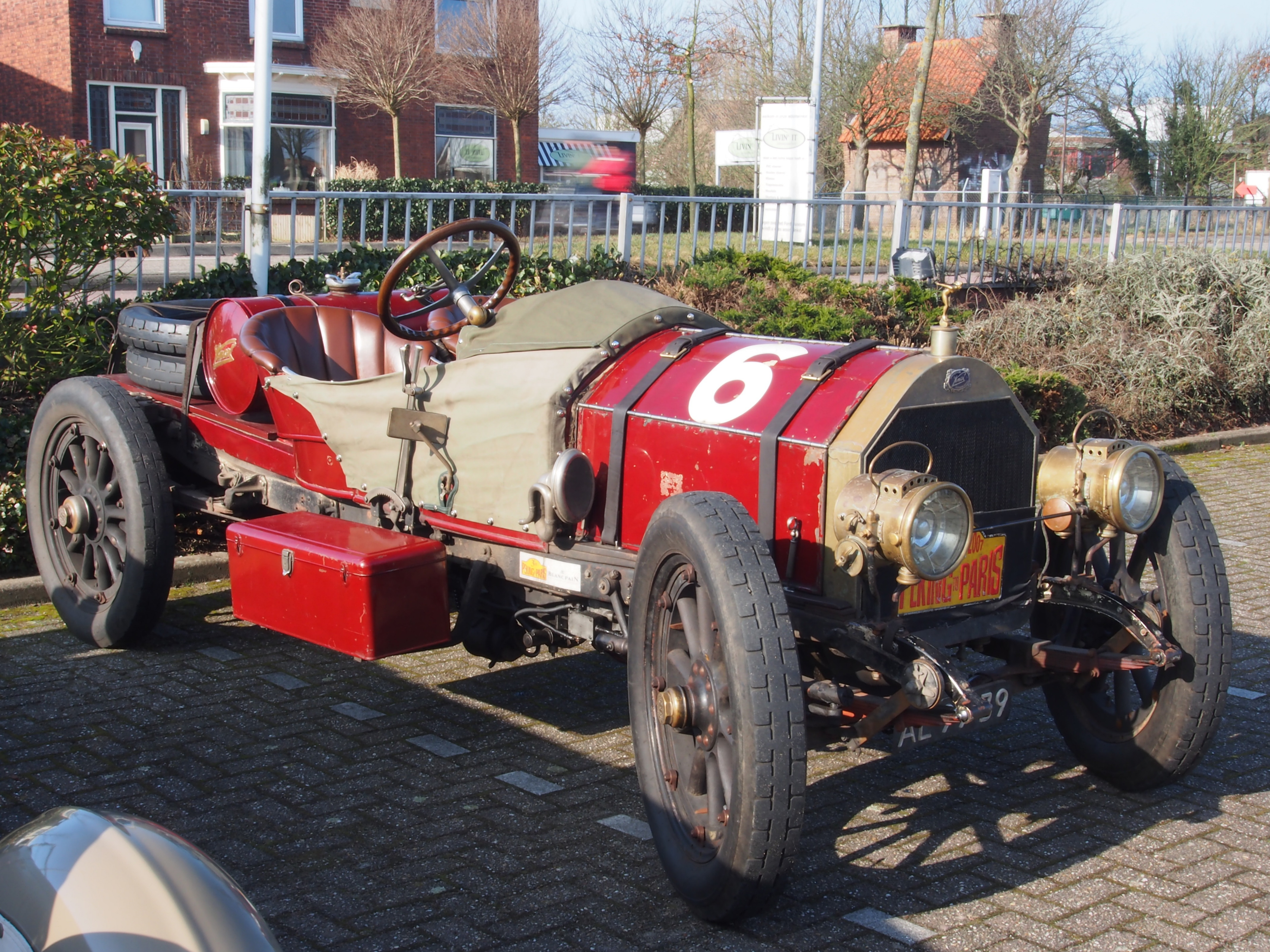
1911 Knox Model R Raceabout

=== Racing ===
The Knox was raced by William Bourque in the 1909 AAA Championship Car race at the Indianapolis Motor Speedway. In 1910 a Knox was driven by Fred Belcher in the Vanderbilt Cup race.

=== Fate ===
By 1912 Knox sales were slipping and a receiver was called in. The last Knox automobiles were built in 1914 and Knox was declared bankrupt in 1915. Knox reorganized as the Knox Motors Corporation and continued to build tractors and trucks until 1924.

Afterwards Harry Knox moved on to design tanks for the US Army Ordnance Department; his T1 Light Tank wasn't adopted, but his Vertical volute spring suspension and his track design were used on almost all American tanks of the WWII, and he designed its replacement HVSS, which served until 1980s in some countries, as well.

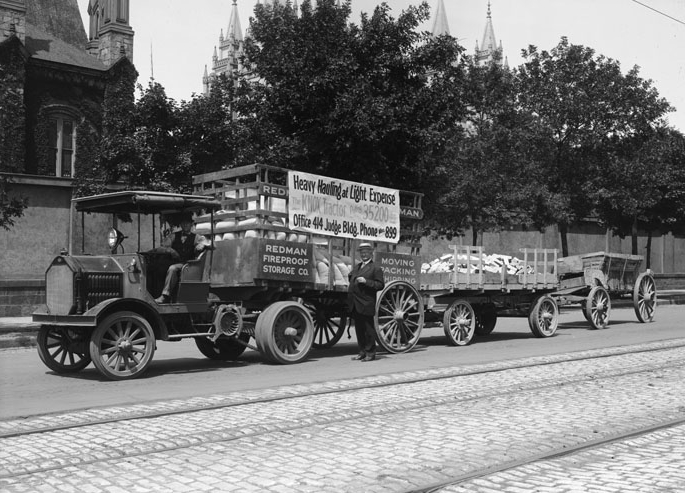
Knox tractor-trailer, Salt Lake City, 1915. Note chain drive, common in this era.

== Gallery ==
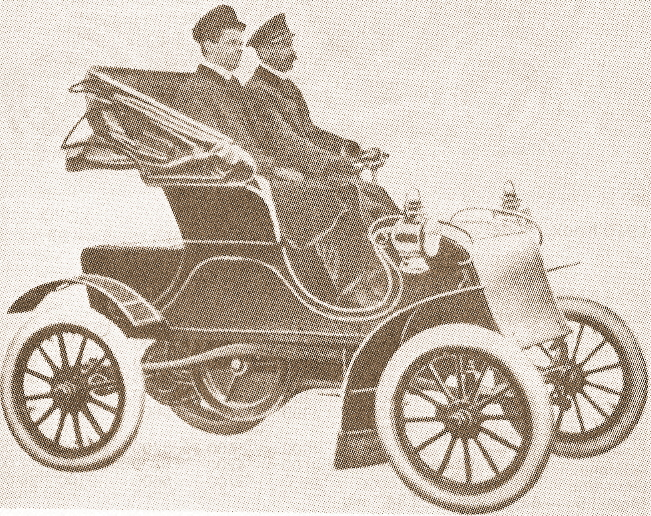
1903 Knox Model C Runabout

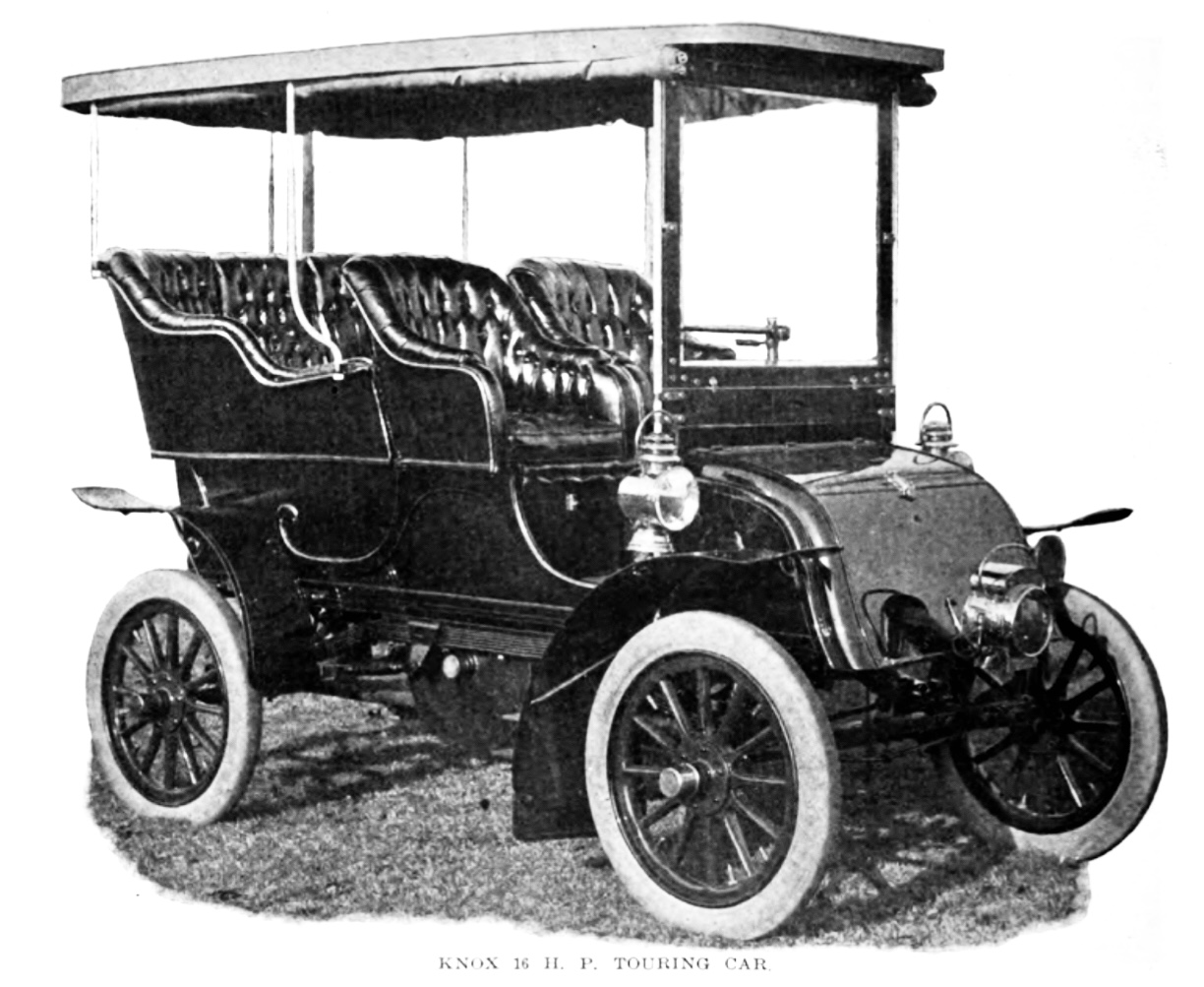
1904 Knox Two Cylinder Touring

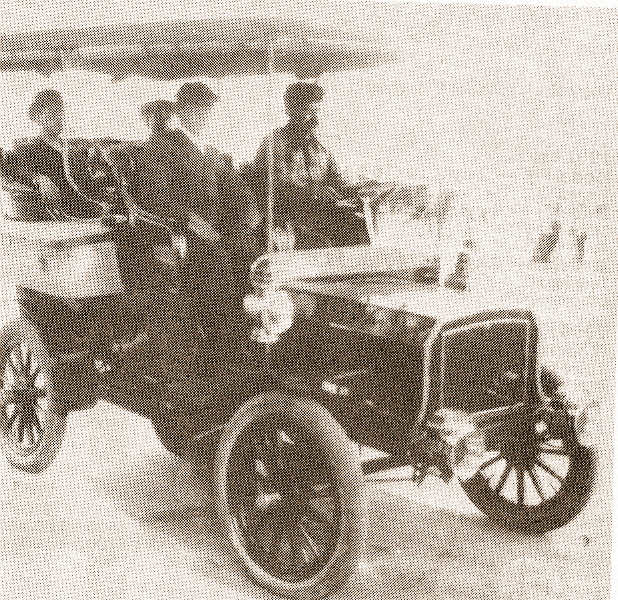
1905 Knox Model F Surrey

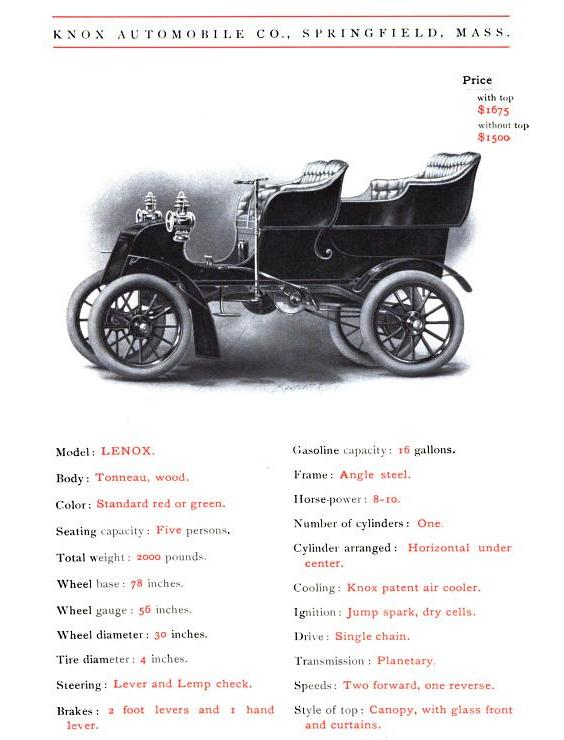
1905 Knox Lenox

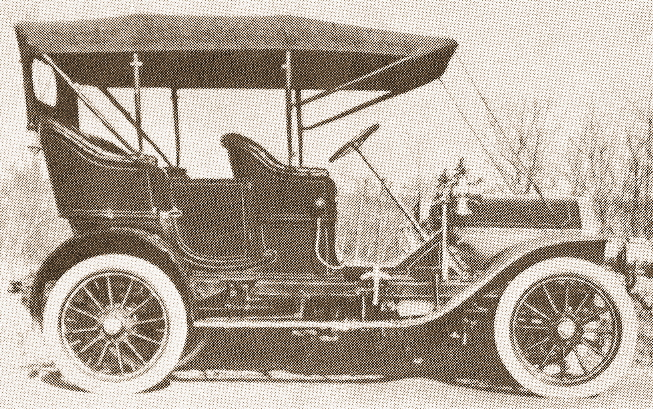
1906 Knox Model G Touring

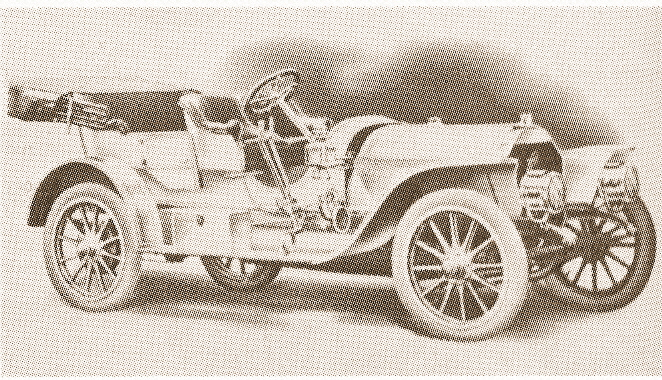
1909 Knox Model O Tonneauette

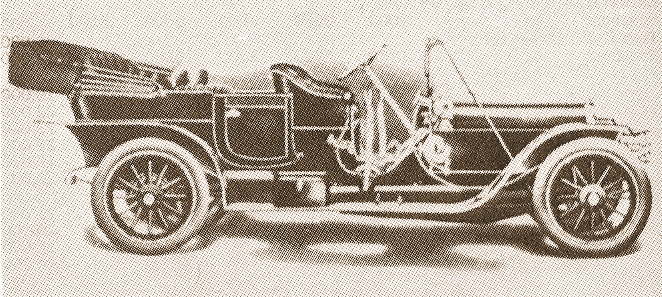
1910 Knox Model S Touring

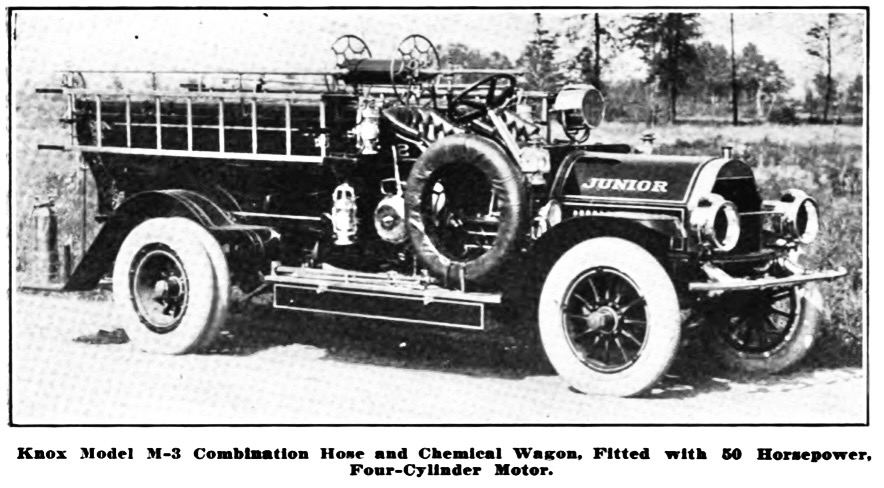
Knox Model M-3 (1911-1912)

== Models ==
Model	Year	Cylinders	Horsepower	Wheelbase
A	1900–1902	1	5 bhp (3.7 kW)	
Two Cylinder	1902	2	8 bhp (6.0 kW)	
B	1902	1	8 bhp (6.0 kW)	69 in (1,800 mm)
C	1903	1	8 bhp (6.0 kW)	72 in (1,800 mm)
Two Cylinder	1904	2	18 bhp (13 kW)	84 in (2,100 mm)
One Cylinder	1904	1	10 bhp (7.5 kW)	72 in (1,800 mm)
E	1905	1	10 bhp (7.5 kW)	72 in (1,800 mm)
F-3	1905–1906	2	16 bhp (12 kW)	87 in (2,200 mm)
F-1	1905–1906	2	16 bhp (12 kW)	81 in (2,100 mm)
F	1905–1906	2	16 bhp (12 kW)	90 in (2,300 mm)
41 ·	1905–(1907)	1	10 bhp (7.5 kW)	78 in (2,000 mm)
39	1905–?	2	18 bhp (13 kW)	96 in (2,400 mm)
F-4	1906–1907	2	16 bhp (12 kW)	81 in (2,100 mm)
102 ·	1906–(1907)	2	16 bhp (12 kW)	111 in (2,800 mm)
G	1906–1908	4	40 bhp (30 kW)	112 in (2,800 mm)
H	1907–1909	4	30 bhp (22 kW)	102 in (2,600 mm)
232	1908-	4	30 bhp (22 kW)	111 in (2,800 mm)
L	1908	4	30 bhp (22 kW)	102 in (2,600 mm)
O	1909	4	38 bhp (28 kW)	102–114 in (2,600–2,900 mm)
M	1909–1910	4	48 bhp (36 kW)	127 in (3,200 mm)
S	1910–1912	6	60 bhp (45 kW)	134 in (3,400 mm)
R	1910–1912	4	40 bhp (30 kW)	117–122 in (3,000–3,100 mm)
R-45	1912	4	40 bhp (30 kW)	126 in (3,200 mm)
66	1913	6	60 bhp (45 kW)	134 in (3,400 mm)
46	1913–1914	6	46 bhp (34 kW)	130–134 in (3,300–3,400 mm)
45	1913–1914	4	40 bhp (30 kW)	126 in (3,200 mm)
44	1913–1914	4	40 bhp (30 kW)	117–122 in (3,000–3,100 mm)

== Production ==
Year	Automobiles	Models	Truck Model
1900	15	A	
1901	100	A	
1902	250	A; Two Cylinder; B	
1903	500	C	
1904	553	Two Cylinder; One Cylinder	
1905	572	E; F-3 ; F-1 ; F; 41; 39	“Atlas“ 3 t ,24 hp
1906	753	F-3 ; F-1 ; F; 41; F-4; 102; G	
1907	1,000	41; F-4; 102; G; H	
1908	1,215	G; H; L	
1909	1,317	H; O; M	15 (3 tons); 18 (5 tons); 20 (3-4 tons)
1910	1,412	M; S; R	
1911	1,215	S; R	M 3
1912	877	S; R; R-45	M-3
1913	673	66; 46; 45; 44	
1914	383	46; 45; 44	
Total	10,835		
1915			
1916			
1917			
1918			
1919			35 (6,5 tons); 36 (6,5 tons)
1920			36 (5 tons); 36 (5 tons all-wheel drive)
1921			36 (5 tons); 36 (5 tons all-wheel drive)
1922			35 (5 tons); 36 (10 tons)
1923			35 (5 tons); 36 (10 tons)
1924			35 (5 tons); 36 (10 tons)
