= Cunningham Inside-Drive Limousine-146-A =

Overview
- Manufacturer: Cunningham Car Company
- Production: 1908-1931

Body and chassis
- Layout: Front Engine, RWD

Powertrain
- Engine: 7,239.6 cubic centimetres (441.79 cu in; 7.2396 L) 3.75 by 5 inches (9.5 cm × 12.7 cm) V8
- Power output: 45 brake horsepower (46 PS; 34 kW); 251 newton-metres (185 lbf⋅ft)
- Transmission: 4-Speed Manual, 1-Reverse

Dimensions
- Wheelbase: 142 inches (3,600 mm)
- Curb weight: 3,700 pounds (1,700 kg)

The Cunningham Inside-Drive Limousine-146-A was manufactured by the Cunningham Carriage Company which produced luxury automobiles between 1908 and 1931.

== Specifications as of 1926 ==
- Color – Optional
- Seating Capacity – Seven
- Wheelbase – 142 inches
- Wheels – Wire, wood, or disc
- Tires - 33” x 6.75” balloon
- Service Brakes – 4-wheel Perrot-Bendix servo-expand
- Engine - Eight cylinder, V-type, 90°, cast en bloc, 3.75 x 5 inches; head removable; valves in side; H.P. 45 N.A.C.C. rating
- Lubrication – Full force feed
- Crankshaft - Three bearing
- Radiator – Cellular
- Cooling – Water pump
- Ignition – Storage Battery
- Starting System – Two Unit
- Voltage – Six
- Wiring System – Single
- Gasoline System – Vacuum
- Clutch – Dry multiple disc
- Transmission – Selective sliding
- Gear Changes – 4 forward, 1 reverse
- Drive – Spiral bevel
- Rear Springs – Three-quarter elliptic
- Rear Axle – Full-floating
- Steering Gear – Worm and gear

== Standard equipment ==
New car price included the following items:

- tools
- speedometer
- ammeter
- voltmeter
- motometer
- ignition theft lock
- automatic windshield cleaner
- spare wheels
- power tire pump
- shock absorbers
- spot light
- front bumper
- spare tire carriers
- luggage rack
- clock
- closed cars have smoking case, vanity cases, and dome light

== Prices ==
New car prices were F.O.B. factory, plus Tax:

- Roadster - $6150
- Four Passenger Touring - $6150
- Six Passenger Touring - $6650
- Seven Passenger Touring - $6650
- Four Passenger Sedan - $7600
- Inside-Drive Limousine - $8100
- Inside-Drive Cabriolet - $8100
- French Brougham - $8100
- Cabriolet - $8100
