= James Cunningham, Son and Company =

Defunct American motor vehicle manufacturer

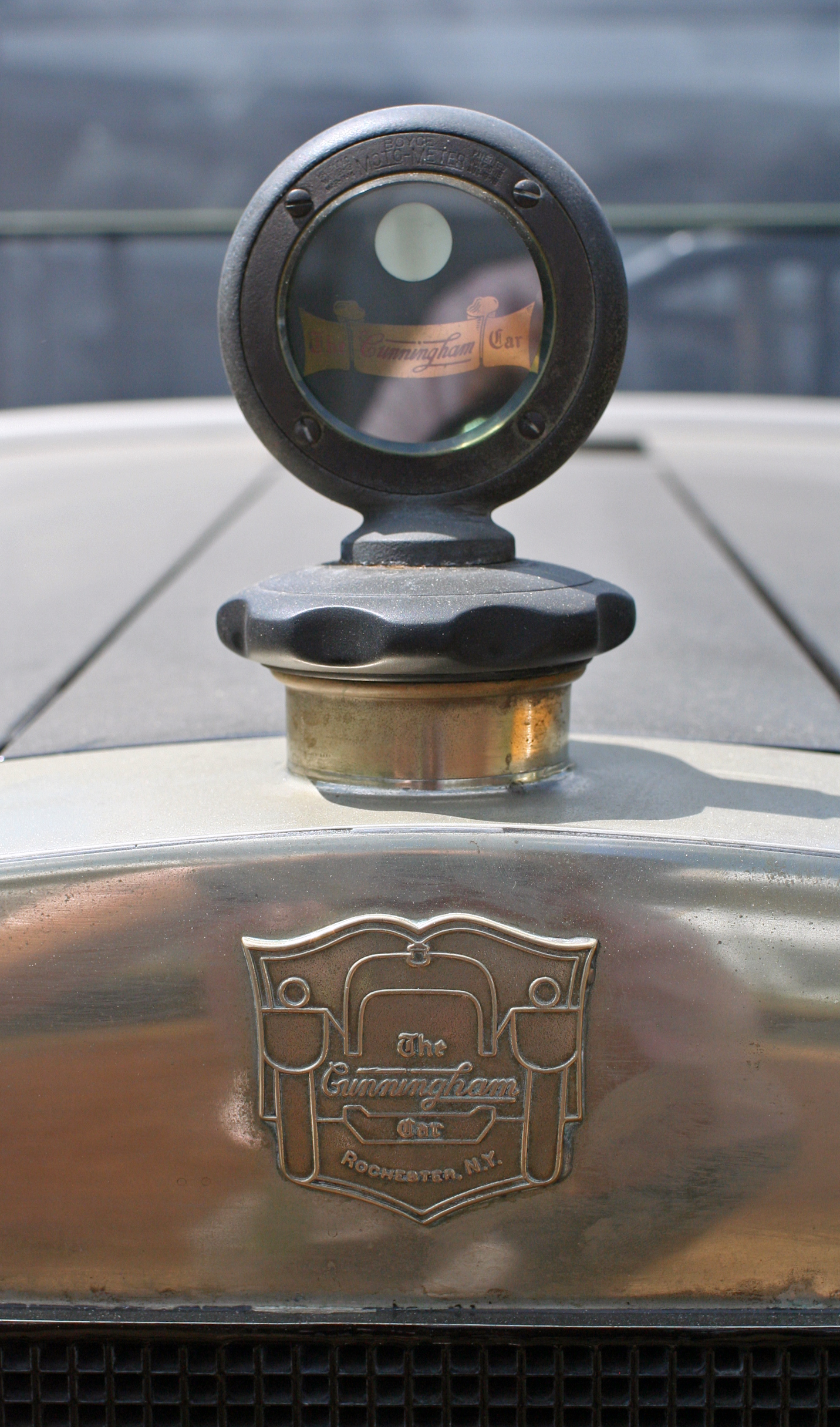
- Company logo on the Cunningham automobile
- Predecessor: Kerr, Cunningham, and Company (1838)
- Founded: 1882; 144 years ago in Rochester, New York, United States
- Founder: James Cunningham
- Defunct: 1936; 90 years ago
- Fate: bankruptcy
- Headquarters: Rochester, New York, United States
- Products: horse-drawn coaches, automobiles

James Cunningham, Son and Company was an American business based in Rochester, New York, initially manufacturing horse-drawn coaches, that from 1908 onward developed and produced automobiles. The Cunningham company was an automobile pioneer, credited as one of the world's earliest car developors and manufacturers. In 1916, it became one of the first automakers to produce an American V8 engine. Its Cunningham automobile was a pioneering American production automobile.

== History ==
The firm dates to 1838, when James Cunningham joined the carriage firm Kerr, Cunningham, and Company.

Incorporated in 1882, and taken over after James' death in 1886 by his son Joseph, the company made fine carriages and sleighs, and became a leading manufacturer of these vehicles before the turn of the century. Cunningham went on to manufacture automobiles, car bodies (mainly hearses), chassis frames for other marques, and aircraft. Today, it is mainly remembered for high-quality luxury automobiles.

Cunningham's emphasis was on quality vehicles of luxury, elegance, and high style. Its products were sometimes innovative, often unique, and in most cases expensive. When it made automobiles, its strategy was to build a car equal to, or better than, the best from Europe.

Cunningham ceased producing automobiles in 1931 but continued to make bodies for other car manufacturers until 1936, when the company went out of business.

== Car production ==
In 1896 the company produced electric-powered buggies, primarily for purposes of experimentation during an era when such electric-powered vehicles were slow, and when vehicles powered by steam required the operator to be certified and licensed.

Foreseeing the necessity to switch to the production of horseless carriages, Cunningham started automobile production in 1908 with gasoline engine cars that sold at approximately $3,500, a very high price at the time. Initially the company made only the chassis. They assembled each car to individual customer requirements, using components from other manufacturers. Engines came from Buffalo or Continental. Cunningham also sold electric cars based on their experimental vehicle from the 1890s. By 1910, the company was producing all its parts and selling its cars in the range of $4,500 to $5,000.

From 1911 Cunningham offered complete automobiles that were illustrated in its first catalogue. They were hand-built and production was slow: one and a half cars per worker per year from a workforce of 450. Much of the wood- and metal-work was crafted by hand.

== Aviation production ==
In 1928 Cunningham began aircraft production as Cunningham-Hall Aircraft Corporation. As with automobile production, its engineers were innovative and they produced a bi-wing plane in 1929 that had a very low landing speed of 39 mph. Cunningham-Hall continued to 1948.

== Other production ==
James Cunningham, Son and Company developed the M1 Armored Car (T24), tested by the Ordnance Department in 1931. The company also manufactured the prototype T1 Light Tank.

The company made high-speed, very-long-life crossbar switches with physically small mechanical parts which permitted faster operation than telephone-type crossbar switches.
