= Cunningham, Virginia =

Unincorporated community in Virginia, United States

Coordinates: 37°52′27″N 78°19′12″W

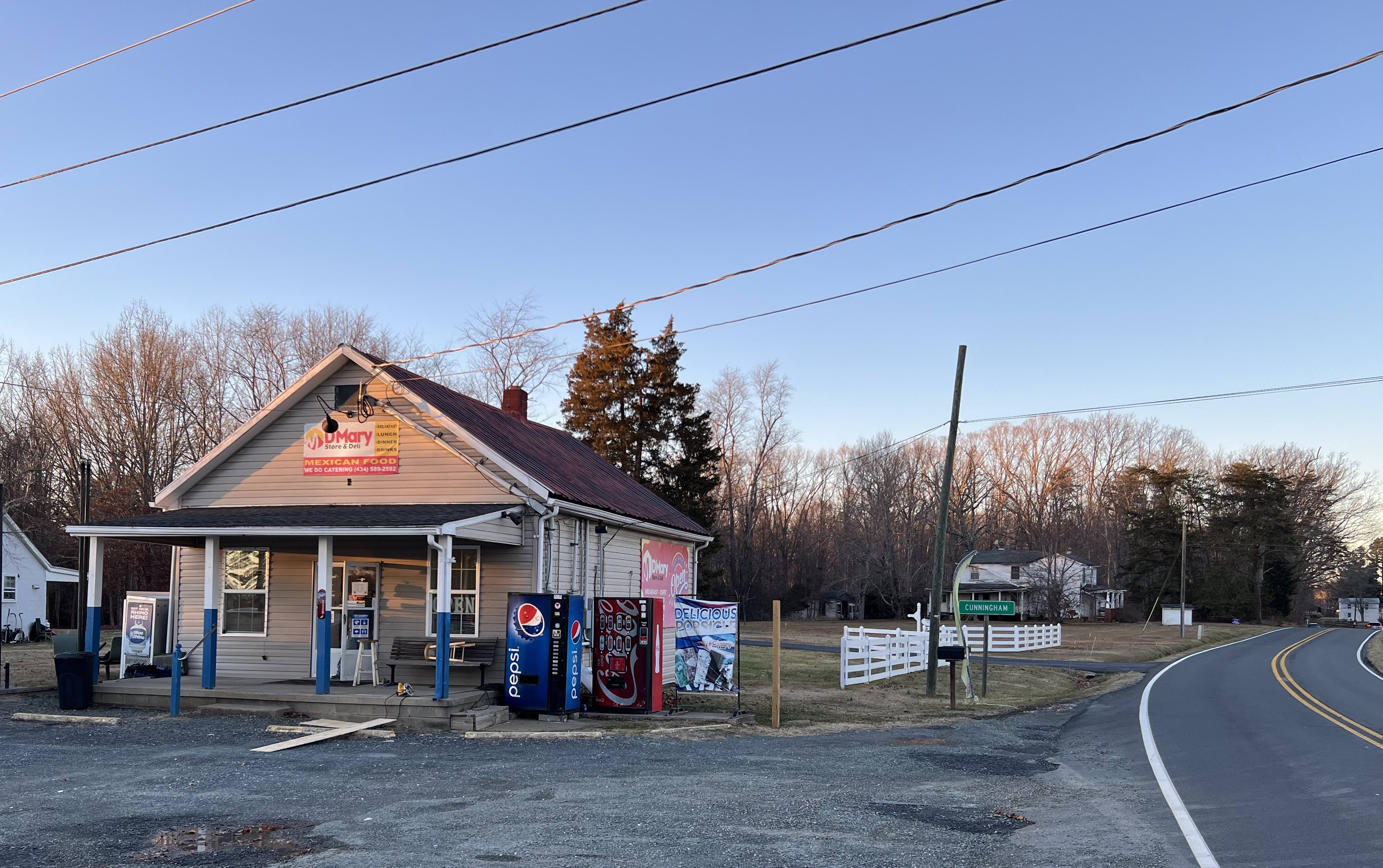
Cunningham, Virginia storefront

Cunningham is an unincorporated community in Fluvanna County, in the U.S. state of Virginia.
