= Cunningham Piano Company =

American piano manufacturer

- Founded: 1891 in Philadelphia, United States
- Products: Pianos

The Cunningham Piano Company is a Philadelphia-based business that was founded in 1891 as a manufacturer of pianos, and closed prior to World War II. It was restarted after the war, as a restoration facility for pianos.

As of 2024, Cunningham Piano continues to restore pianos in its Philadelphia facility, and also has showrooms selling new and restored pianos in King of Prussia, Pennsylvania; Cherry Hill, New Jersey; and Delmar, Delaware.

== History ==
Founded in 1891 by Patrick J. Cunningham, an Irish migrant with woodworking experience, the company manufactured acoustic upright, grand, and player pianos until 1943 when the factory ceased production.

In their first decade of manufacturing, Cunningham Piano Company gained recognition and became a popular piano-making company in Philadelphia's Germantown neighborhood.

During the 1920s, the heyday of the pneumatic player piano, Cunningham Piano Company was the largest manufacturer of player pianos in Philadelphia and shipped their wares to the entire East Coast of the United States.

Noted musicians used the instruments, including Vincent Persichetti, a native Philadelphian and noted composer and professor at the Juilliard School and George Gershwin who used a Cunningham Piano to write his opera "Porgy and Bess" in Folly Beach, South Carolina.

The Great Depression was a great blow to the business. Before the start of World War II, Cunningham Piano Company ceased production.

== After World War II ==
After the Second World War, Louis Cohen, a young piano technician who had worked for Patrick J. Cunningham, took over Cunningham Piano Company. Cohen determined that building a small number of pianos by hand without the national recognition of companies like Mason & Hamlin, Steinway, or Baldwin was difficult in the economic climate of the post World War II era. He gathered talent from those manufacturers to set up a restoration facility in Germantown, Philadelphia, a new location.

As of 2016, Cunningham Piano Company was the North American warranty center for Bösendorfer pianos.
