= Cunningham Steam Wagon =

Defunct American motor vehicle manufacturer

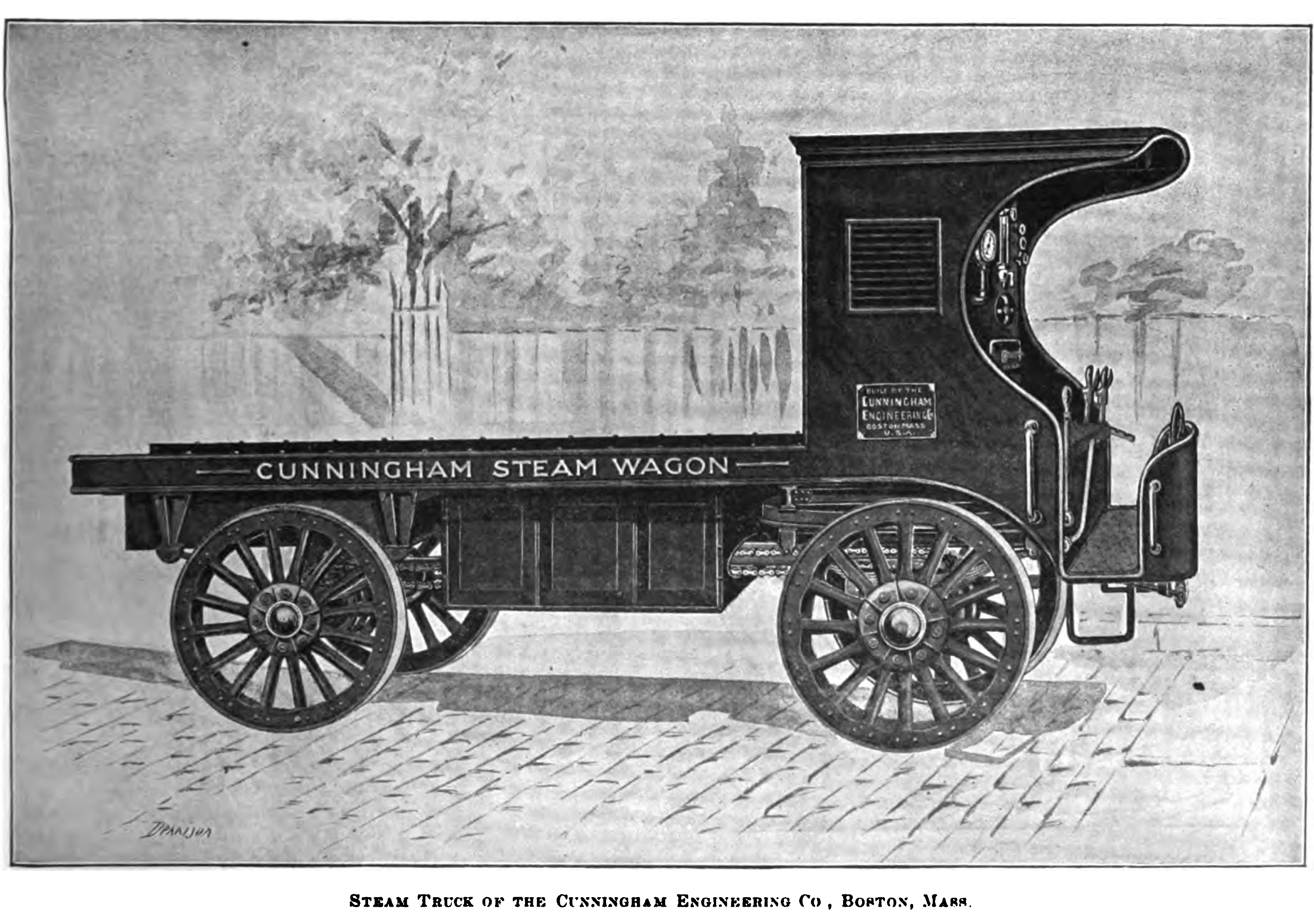
Cunningham steam wagon

The Cunningham Steam Wagon was a product of the Massachusetts Steam Wagon Company of Pittsfield, Massachusetts, in the United States. The firm was established in December 1900, with the intention of manufacturing the products that the Cunningham Engineering Company of Boston, Massachusetts, planned to develop. Instead, they built a small steam powered truck with four wheel drive. Production ceased at the end of 1901.

The truck was the product of The Cunningham Engineering Co., located in the Tremont Building in Boston. It was reported that vehicles of three, six, and eight short tons (2.7, 5.4, and 7.3 metric tons) were being built as of October, 1900. There is no relationship known to the Cunningham automobile from Rochester, New York.

== Description ==
The frame and cab were constructed of iron, 15 feet 10 inches (4.83 m) long by 5 feet 6 inches (1.68 m) wide. The wheels were of composite construction (cast iron, oak and steel) mounted on steel axles 2 1/2 inches (64 mm) in diameter. Steering was by rotating the rigid front axle on a "fifth wheel". The rear axle was provided with four leaf springs, one either side of each rear wheel. Weight from the load was thus taken directly to the wheels without any strain being placed upon the central part of the axle and differential.

There were two power units mounted between the wheels, visible as the boxes in the illustration. Each power unit was a double-expansion cross-compound unit consisting of high- and low-pressure cylinders of 3 1/2 and 5 inches (89 and 127 mm) diameter respectively, with a common stroke of 5 inches (130 mm). However the truck was supplied with a valve that could convert the compound working to all cylinders receiving full high pressure. The engine shaft was common to both power units, running across the full width of the vehicle. The engine shaft was furnished with a 4 1/2-inch (110 mm) pinion which engaged with gears on the two hydraulic clutches. The clutches (Cunningham clutches) could be engaged independently permitting no drive, front only, rear only or four wheel drive. The clutches were operated by water pressing upon a rubber diaphragm which drove the friction surfaces together. Steam was applied to the hydraulics to provide the pressure. The outside of each clutch was surrounded by the brake shoes and blocks. The output of each clutch was to an intermediate shaft having a two chain pinions. Each of the pairs of chains from the motor drove a pair of sprockets in the gear case on each axle. Each gear case could be tensioned by a pair of chain braces. Between the sprockets was a pinion that engaged with the crown wheel of the differential. The front differential assembly also contained a gimbal to permit steering.

The boiler was a vertical water-tube type, 4 feet (1.2 m) high and 25 inches (640 mm) in diameter. It could operate on coke, coal or liquid fuel. The boiler feed pump returned the condensate from a hot well to the boiler. The condenser had two coils, one for the feed water and one for the exhaust steam. The condenser cylinder had water from the water tank pumped through it to cool the coils. The boiler was designed for 200 psi (1,400 kPa; 14 bar) operation.

With the engine running at 300 rpm, the truck's speed was about 6 1/2 miles per hour (10 km/h).

== Sources ==
- Kimes, Beverly Rae; Clark, Henry Austin Jr., eds. (1989). Standard Catalogue of American Cars (2nd ed.). Iola, Wisconsin: Krause Publications. ISBN 0-87341-111-0.
- Ingersoll, E.P., ed. (1900-10-03). "The Cunningham Steam Truck". The Horseless Age. VII (1). New York.
- Ingersoll, E.P., ed. (1900-11-07). "Advertisement for Cunningham Engineering Company". The Horseless Age. VII (6). New York.
