= Cunningham, Georgia =

Unincorporated community in Georgia, U.S.

Coordinates: 34°09′54″N 85°15′48″W

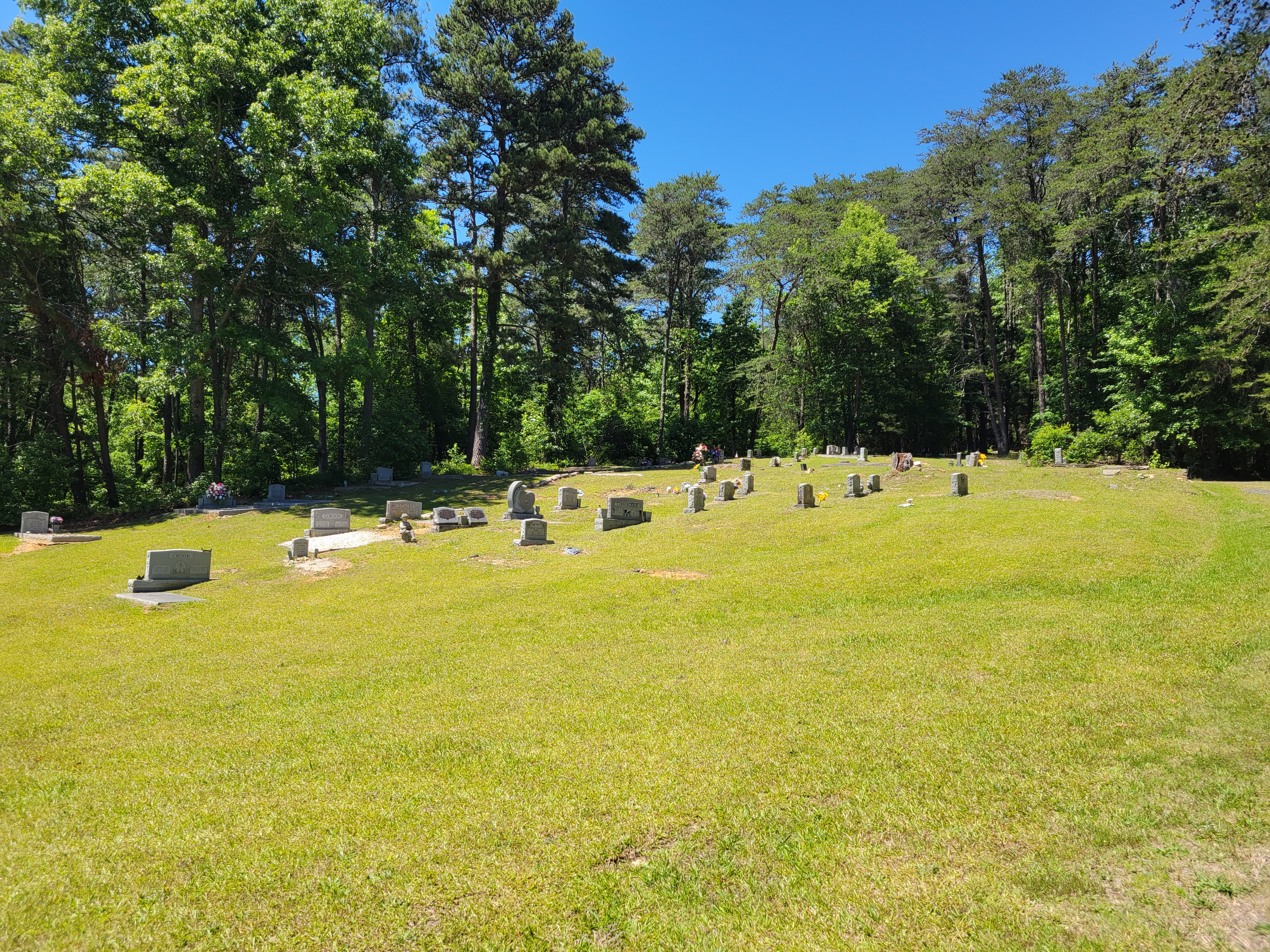
Flat Rock Cemetery

Cunningham is an unincorporated community in Floyd County, in the U.S. state of Georgia.

== History ==
Variant names were "Cunningham Station" and "Agate". A post office called Cunningham's Station was established in 1870, closed in 1874, reopened as Agate in 1881, and closed permanently in 1933. In 1900, the community had 53 inhabitants.
