= Cunningham Creek =

Cunningham Creek is a creek located in the Cariboo region of British Columbia. The creek was discovered in 1861 by William Cunningham. The creek was mined for gold by European and Chinese Miners.
