= Justice Cunningham (disambiguation) =

Justice Cunningham (born 1991), is an American football tight end. Justice Cunningham may also refer to:

- Bill Cunningham (judge) (born 1944), associate justice of the Kentucky Supreme Court
- Donnell L. Cunningham (1866–1947), associate justice of the Arizona Supreme Court
- Edwin Wilber Cunningham (1842–1905), associate justice of the Kansas Supreme Court
- Joseph F. Cunningham (1924–2008), associate justice of the Supreme Court of Illinois
