= Beverly Rae Kimes =

American automotive journalist

- Born: August 17, 1939; West Chicago, Illinois, U.S.
- Died: May 12, 2008 (aged 68); Manhattan, New York, U.S.
- Occupations: Automotive journalist, historian
- Spouse: James H. Cox (m. 1984)

Beverly Rae Kimes (August 17, 1939 – May 12, 2008) was an American automotive journalist and historian, known as the "First Lady of Automotive History" and "The Grande Dame of Automobile History". She was born in West Chicago, Illinois on August 17, 1939 and grew up in Wheaton, Illinois. She received bachelor's degrees in history and journalism from the University of Illinois Urbana-Champaign, and a master's degree in journalism from the Pennsylvania State University in 1963.

Her first job was at Automobile Quarterly in 1963. She said that her main qualification when she started was her driver's license. She had originally wanted to be a theater writer, but once she started writing about cars, the theater dream faded. She said, "My first assignment was a history of the Curved Dash Oldsmobile and I was hooked." She was promoted to head editor in 1975, a position she held until 1981, when she left to concentrate on free-lance writing.

== Books ==
She went on to write 15 books, including "The Standard Catalog of American Automobiles", considered by auto journalists as the most comprehensive work on the history of defunct automobile companies. Her co-writer was Henry Austin Clark, Jr. Some of her other works include "The Classic Era," "Pioneers, Engineers, And Scoundrels: The Dawn Of The Automobile In America," "The Star and the Laurel: The Centennial History of Daimler, Mercedes, and Benz, 1886-1986," “Packard: A History of the Motor Car and the Company,” "The Cars That Henry Ford Built," "Walter L Marr: Buick's Amazing Engineer," (with James H. Cox), (books which won the Nicholas-Joseph Cugnot Award), "Chevrolet: A History from 1911," (with Robert Ackerson), "Speed, Style and Beauty, and "My Two Lives" She also became editor of the Classic Car magazine, for the Classic Car Club of America.

== Awards ==
Kimes received numerous awards including several Moto Awards from the International Automotive Media Awards and the Thomas McKean Memorial Cup from the Antique Automobile Club of America. She was honored by Society of Automobile Historians as a Friend of Automotive History, their highest award. In 1993, she received a Distinguished Service Citation from the Automotive Hall of Fame.

== Personal life and death ==
In 1984, Kimes was married to James H. Cox, her collaborator on the Walter Marr book. Her full name after marriage was Beverly Rae Kimes Cox.

Kimes' husband, James Cox, announced her death on May 12, 2008. She died of kidney failure in Lenox Hill Hospital in Manhattan, New York.
