= REO Motor Car Company =

American automotive company

- Industry: Automotive
- Founded: 1905; 121 years ago
- Founder: Ransom E. Olds
- Defunct: 1967; 59 years ago
- Fate: Vehicle manufacturing division merged with Diamond T to form Diamond Reo Trucks, remainder transformed into Nucor
- Successor: Diamond Reo Trucks; Nucor
- Headquarters: Lansing, Michigan
- Products: Cars, buses, trucks

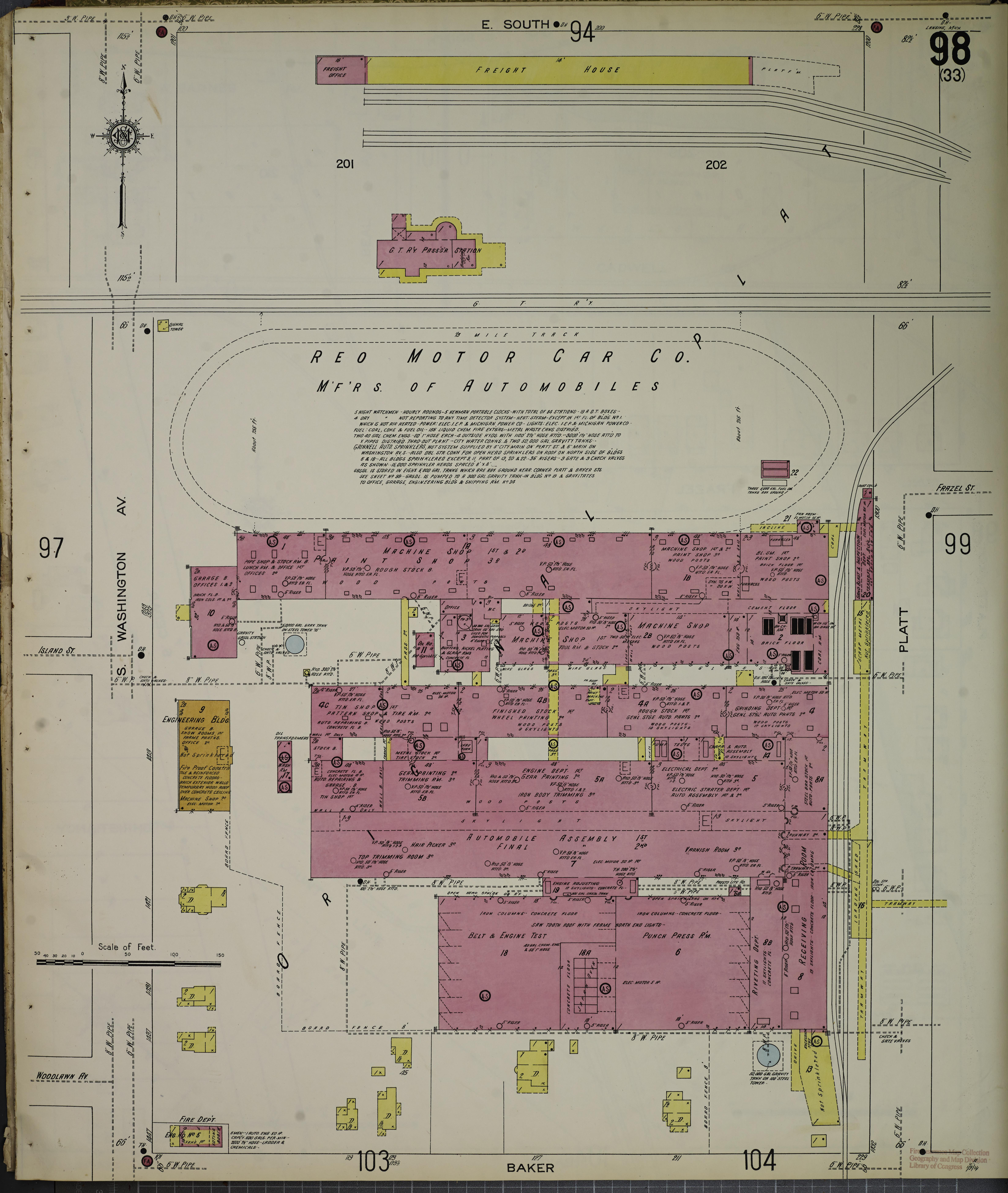
Reo plant (1913)

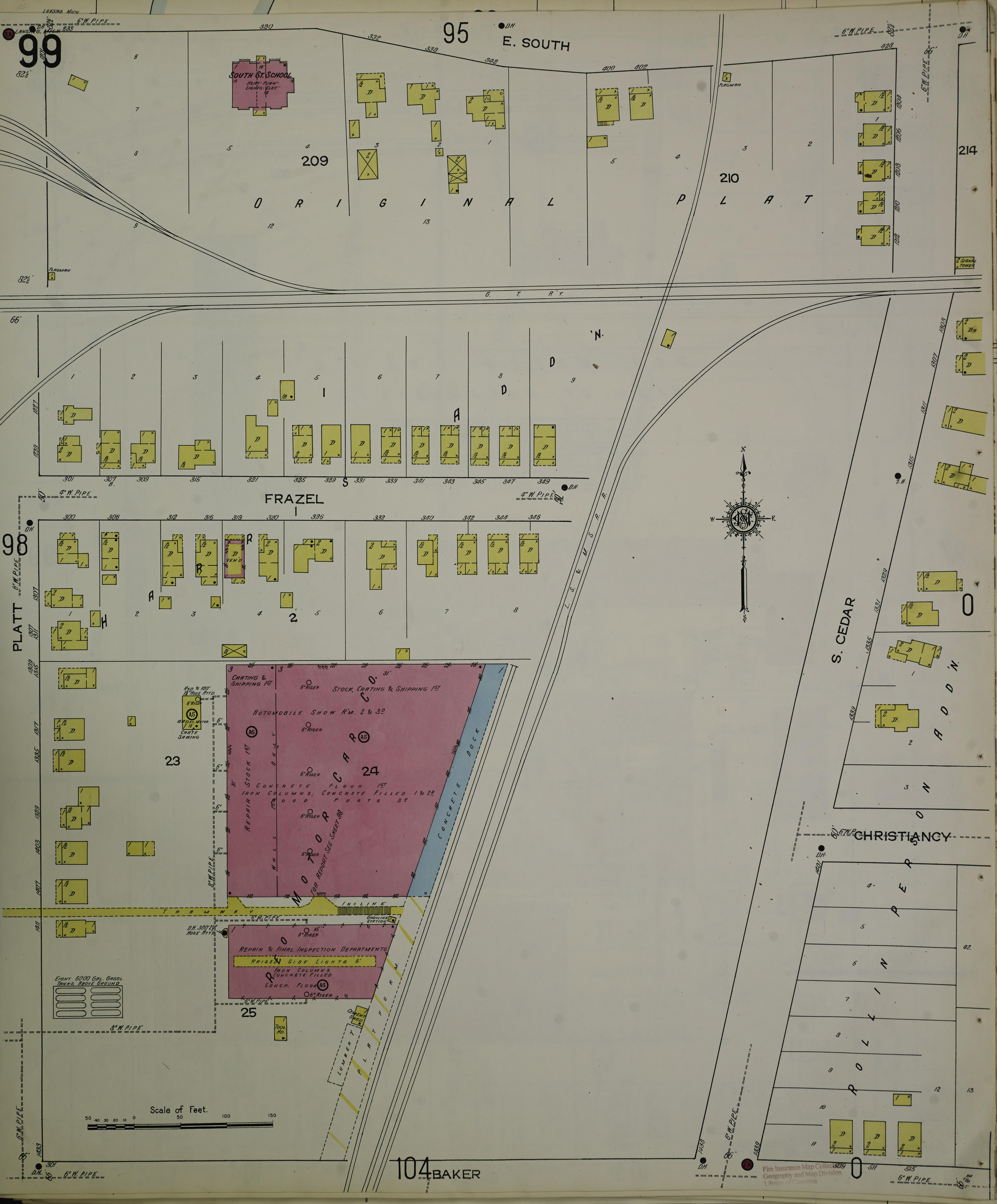
Reo plant II (1913)

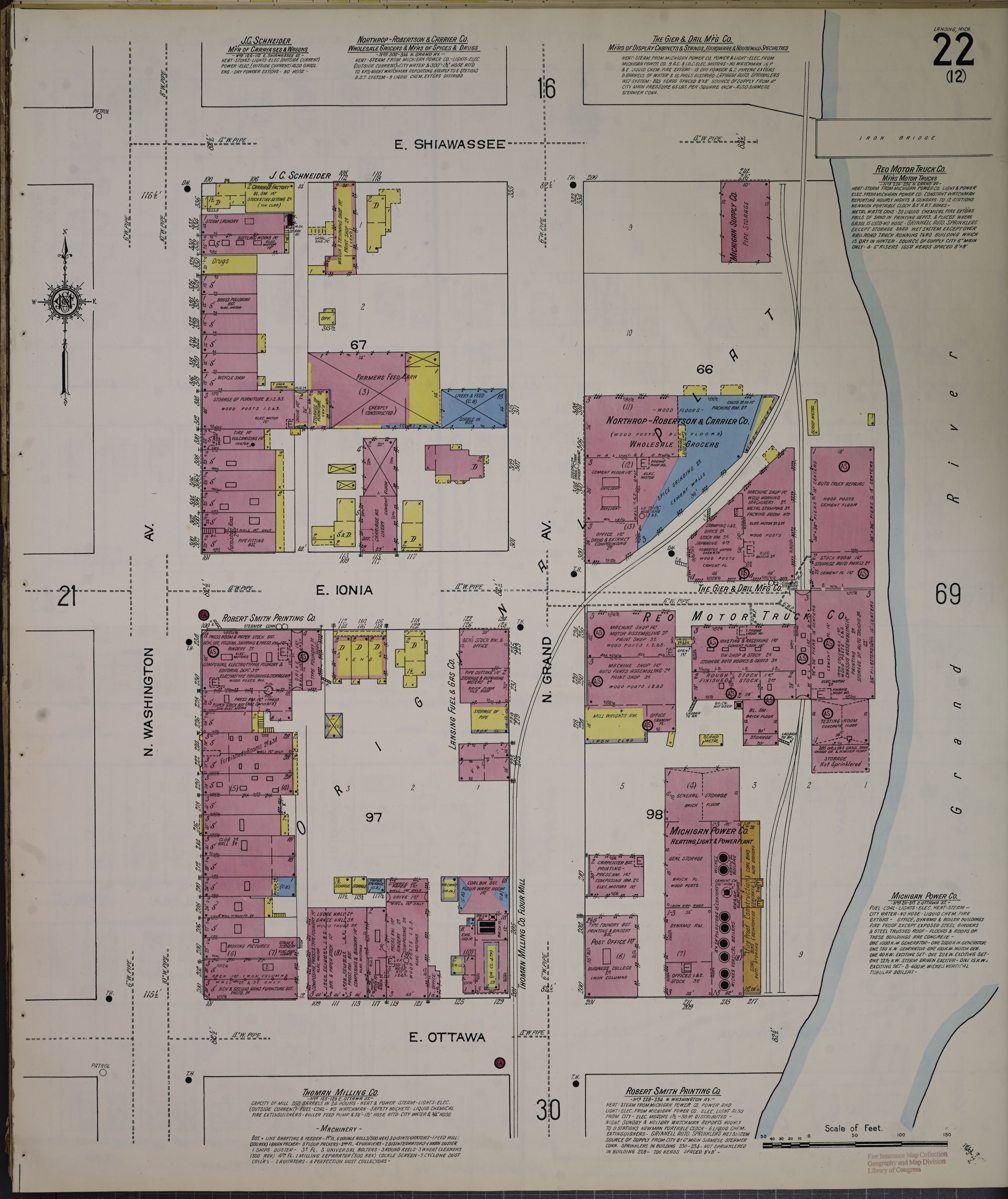
Reo Truck plant (1913)

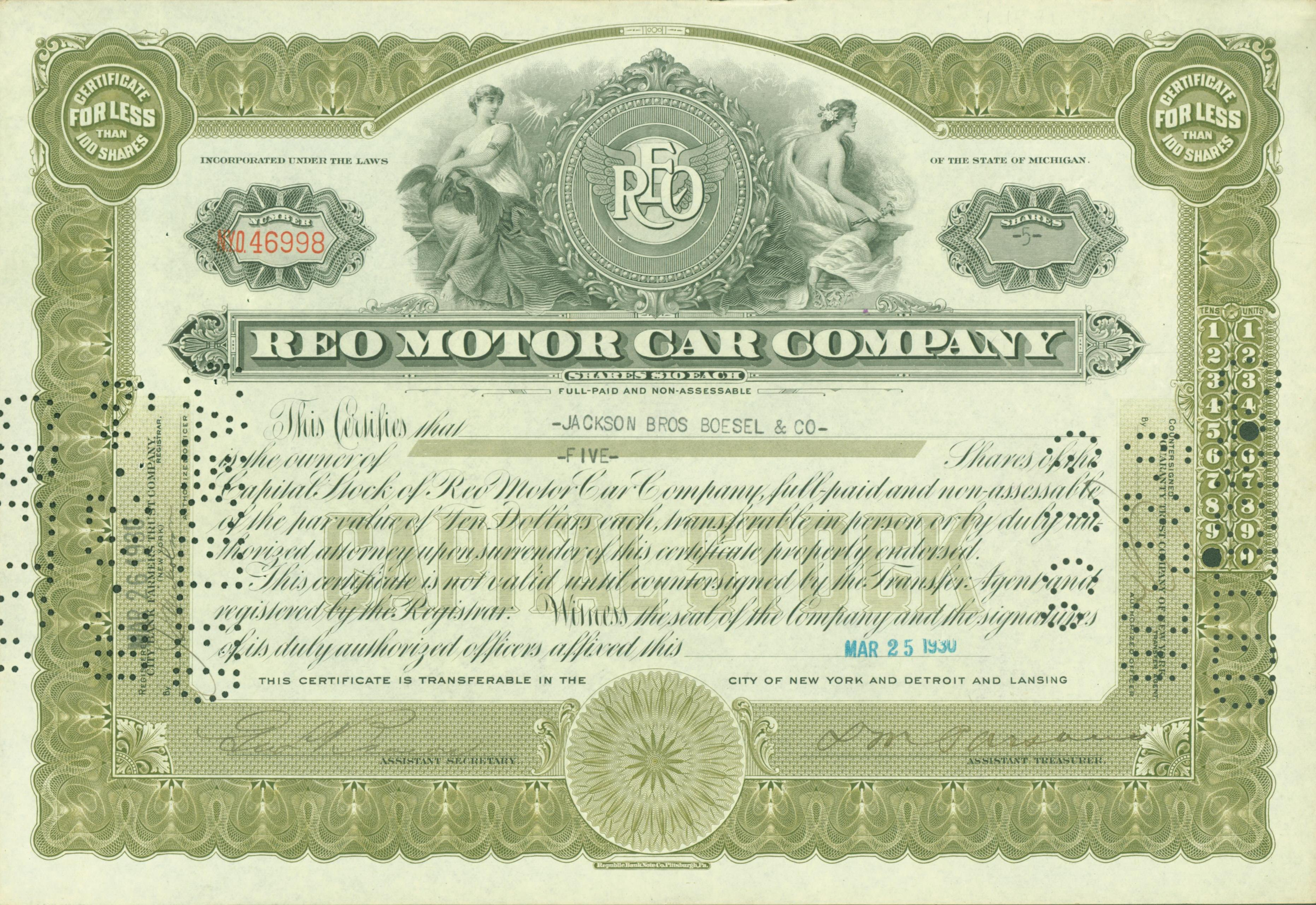
Share of the Reo Motor Car Company, issued 25 March 1930

The REO Motor Car Company (REO pronounced /ˈriːoʊ/, not letter by letter) was an American company based in Lansing, Michigan, which produced automobiles and trucks from 1905 to 1975. At one point, the company also manufactured buses on its truck platforms.

Ransom E. Olds was an entrepreneur who founded multiple companies in the automobile industry. In 1897 Olds founded Oldsmobile. In 1905 Olds left Oldsmobile and established a new company, REO Motor Car Company, in Lansing, Michigan. Olds had 52% of the stock and the titles of president and general manager. To ensure a reliable supply of parts, he organized a number of subsidiary firms, like the National Coil Company, the Michigan Screw Company, and the Atlas Drop Forge Company.

Originally the company was to be called "R. E. Olds Motor Car Company", but the owner of Olds' previous company, then called Olds Motor Works, objected and threatened legal action on the grounds of likely confusion of names by consumers. Olds then changed the name to his initials. Olds Motor Works soon adopted the popular name of its vehicles, Oldsmobile (which, along with Buick and Cadillac, became a founding division of General Motors Corporation).

The company's name was spelled alternately in all capitals REO or with only an initial capital as Reo, and the company's own literature was inconsistent in this regard, with early advertising using all capitals, and later advertising using the "Reo" capitalization. The pronunciation, however, was as a single word. Lansing is home to the R. E. Olds Transportation Museum.

== Early production ==
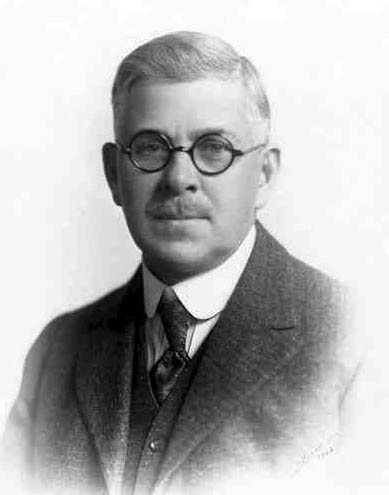
Ransom E. Olds, founder of REO

By 1907, REO had gross sales of $4.5 million, and the company was one of the four wealthiest automobile manufacturers in the U.S. After 1908, however, despite the introduction of improved cars designed by Olds, REO's share of the automobile market decreased due in part to competition from emerging companies like Ford and General Motors.

REO added a truck-manufacturing division and a Canadian plant in St Catharines, Ontario, in 1910. Two years later, Olds claimed that he had built the best car he could, a tourer able to seat two, four, or five, with a 30–35 hp (22–26 kW) engine, 112 inches (2,845 mm) wheelbase, and 32 inches (81 cm) wheels, for $1,055 (not including top, windshield, or gas tank, which were US$100 extra); self-starter was $25 more.

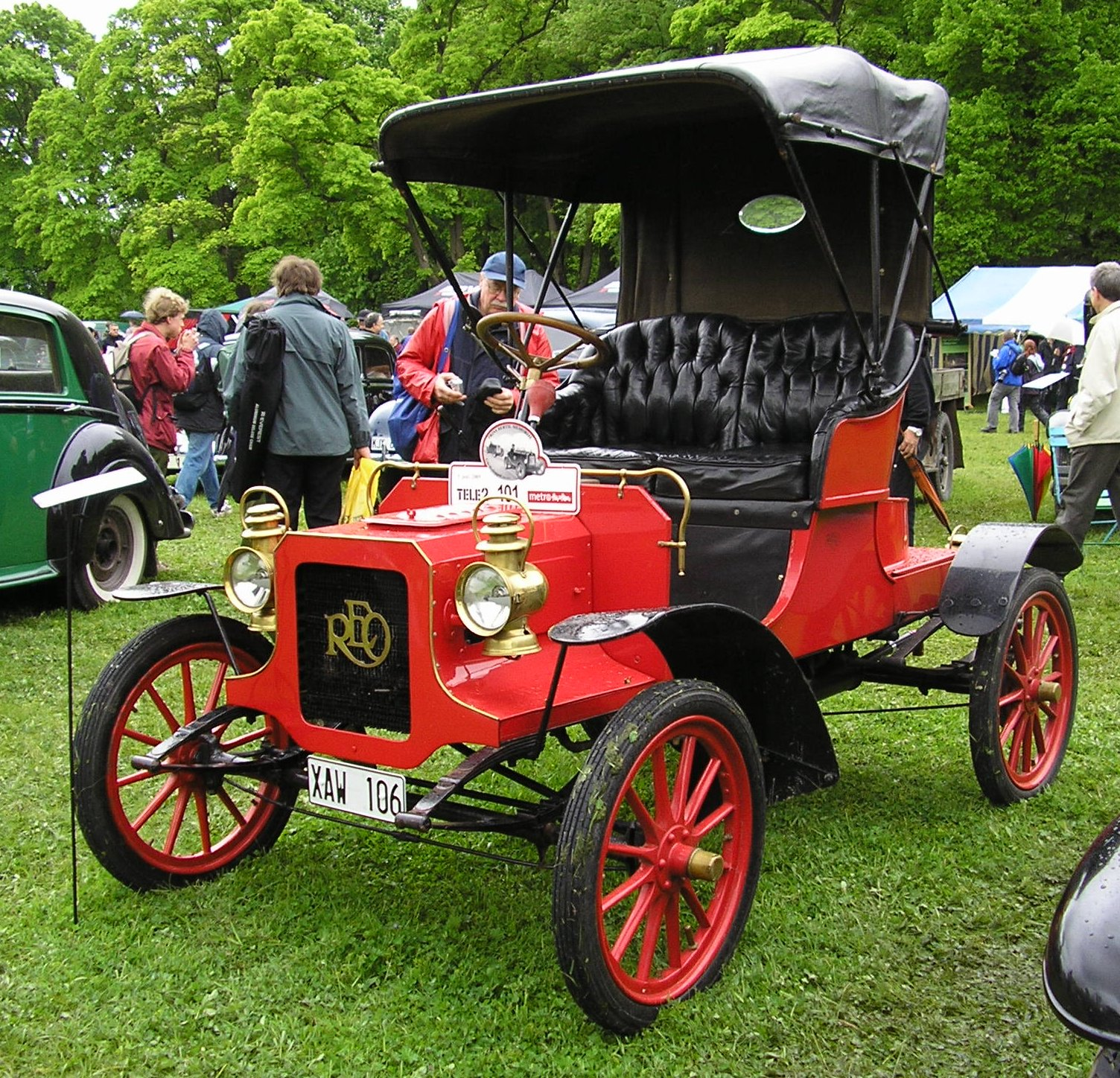
1906 REO Model B Runabout exhibited in 2005

In 1912 an REO special touring car made a 4,176 miles (6,720 km) Trans-Canada trip from Halifax, Nova Scotia, to Vancouver, British Columbia. The car, with mechanic/driver Fonce V. (Jack) Haney and journalist Thomas W. Wilby made the first trip by automobile across Canada (including one short jaunt into northeastern Washington State when the Canadian roads were virtually impassable).

In 1915, Olds relinquished the title of general manager to his protégé Richard H. Scott, and eight years later he also ended his tenure as president, remaining as chairman of the board.

From 1915 to 1925, under Scott's direction, REO remained profitable. The REO Speed Wagon was a light motor truck first introduced in 1915, an ancestor of the pickup truck. In 1923, the company sold an early recreational vehicle, called the "Motor Pullman Car". Designed by Battle Creek, Michigan, newspaper editor J. H. Brown, the automobile included a drop-down sleeping extension, a built-in gas cooking range, and a refrigerator.

In 1925 Scott, like many of his competitors, began an ambitious expansion program designed to make the company more competitive by offering cars in different price ranges. The failure of this program and the effects of the Great Depression caused such losses that Olds returned from retirement in 1933 and assumed control, but resigned in 1934. In 1936, REO abandoned the manufacture of automobiles to concentrate on trucks. In 1935, REO sold 5101 units and in 1936 it was 4227 trucks. In 1938, REO sold 2929 units and in 1939 it was 853 trucks.

Number of Motor Vehicles produced by REO

- 1905 - 12-15 Vehicles per day
- 1909 - 5728 Vehicles
- 1910 - 6588 Vehicles
- 1911 - 5728 Vehicles
- 1912 - 6342 Vehicles
- 1913 - 7647 Vehicles
- 1914 - 12745 Vehicles
- 1915 - 22247 Vehicles
- 1916 - 27811 Vehicles
- 1917 - 30246 Vehicles
- 1918 - 20158 Vehicles
- 1919 - 16483 Vehicles
- 1920 - 32800 Vehicles
- 1921 - 22342 Vehicles
- 1922 - 23152 Vehicles
- 1923 - 31880 Vehicles
- 1924 - 28681 Vehicles
- 1925 - 32650 Vehicles
- 1926 - 34542 Vehicles

== Reo Flying Cloud and Reo Royale ==
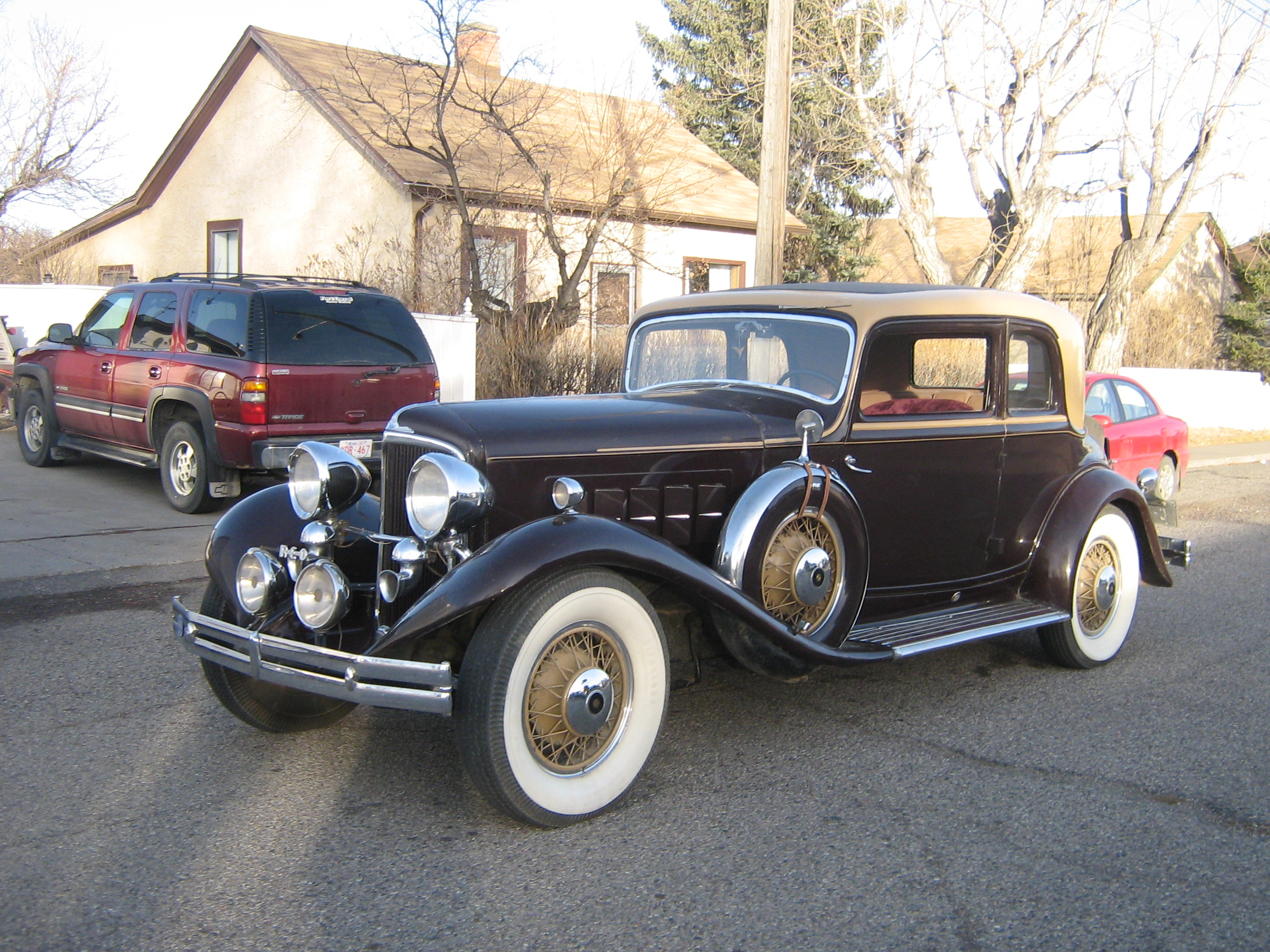
1931 REO Royale Victoria Eight

REO's two most memorable cars were its Reo Flying Cloud introduced in 1927 and the Reo Royale 8 of 1931.

The Flying Cloud was the first car to use Lockheed's new hydraulic internal expanding brake system and featured styling by Fabio Segardi. It had a 115-inch (2,900 mm) wheelbase. As Ned Jordan had transformed automobile advertising with his "Somewhere West of Laramie" ads for the Jordan Playboy, Reo changed the way automobiles were named with the Flying Cloud, a name that evoked speed and lightness. The final REO model of 1936 was a Flying Cloud.

In April 1927, Reo introduced the Wolverine brand as a companion to the Flying Cloud. With a Continental engine, artillery wheels, and a different pattern of horizontal radiator louvers, the Wolverine was made until 1928.

The 1931 Reo Royale introduced trendsetting design elements that established true automotive streamlining in the American market. The 8-cylinder model was sold through 1933 with minor updates. The name was used on a lower-priced 6-cylinder model through 1935. Beverly Rae Kimes, editor of the Standard Catalog of American Cars, terms the Royale "the most fabulous Reo of all". In addition to its coachwork by Murray designed by their Amos Northup, the Royale also provided buyers with a 125 hp (93 kW) straight-eight with a nine-bearing crankshaft, one-shot lubrication, and thermostatically-controlled radiator shutters. The Royale rode upon factory wheelbases of 131 inches (3,300 mm) (Model 8-31) and 135 inches (3,400 mm) (Model 8-35); a 1932 custom version rode upon a 152-inch (3,900 mm) wheelbase (Model 8-52). As many as 3 Dietrich coachbuilt bodies were built on 148-inch (3,800 mm) wheelbases in 1931. Beginning in 1933, the Royale also featured as an option REO's semi-automatic transmission, the Self-Shifter. This unit was unreliable, and Consumers Union Reports advised readers to avoid it. The Model 8-31 was priced at $2,145. The model 8-35 was priced from $2,745 for the sedan to $3,000 for the convertible coupe. The coachbuilt cars were priced close to $6,000. A convertible Victoria was listed at $3,195 but only one is known to have been built. The 8-35 & 8-52 are considered full CCCA classics.

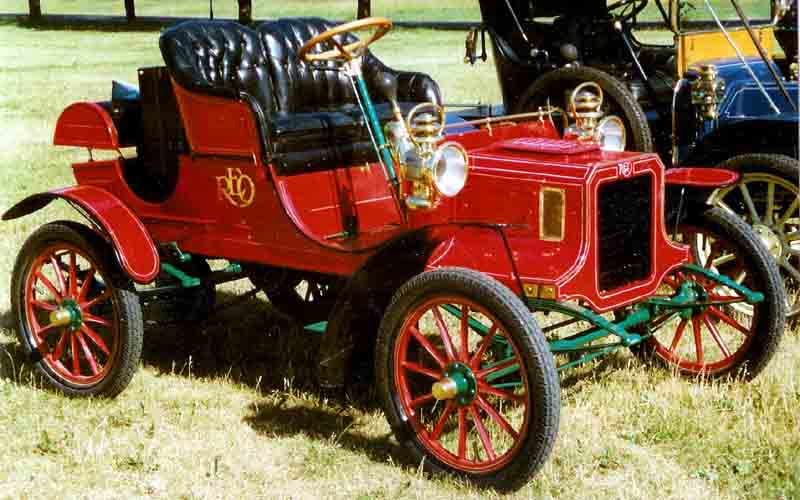
REO runabout 1906

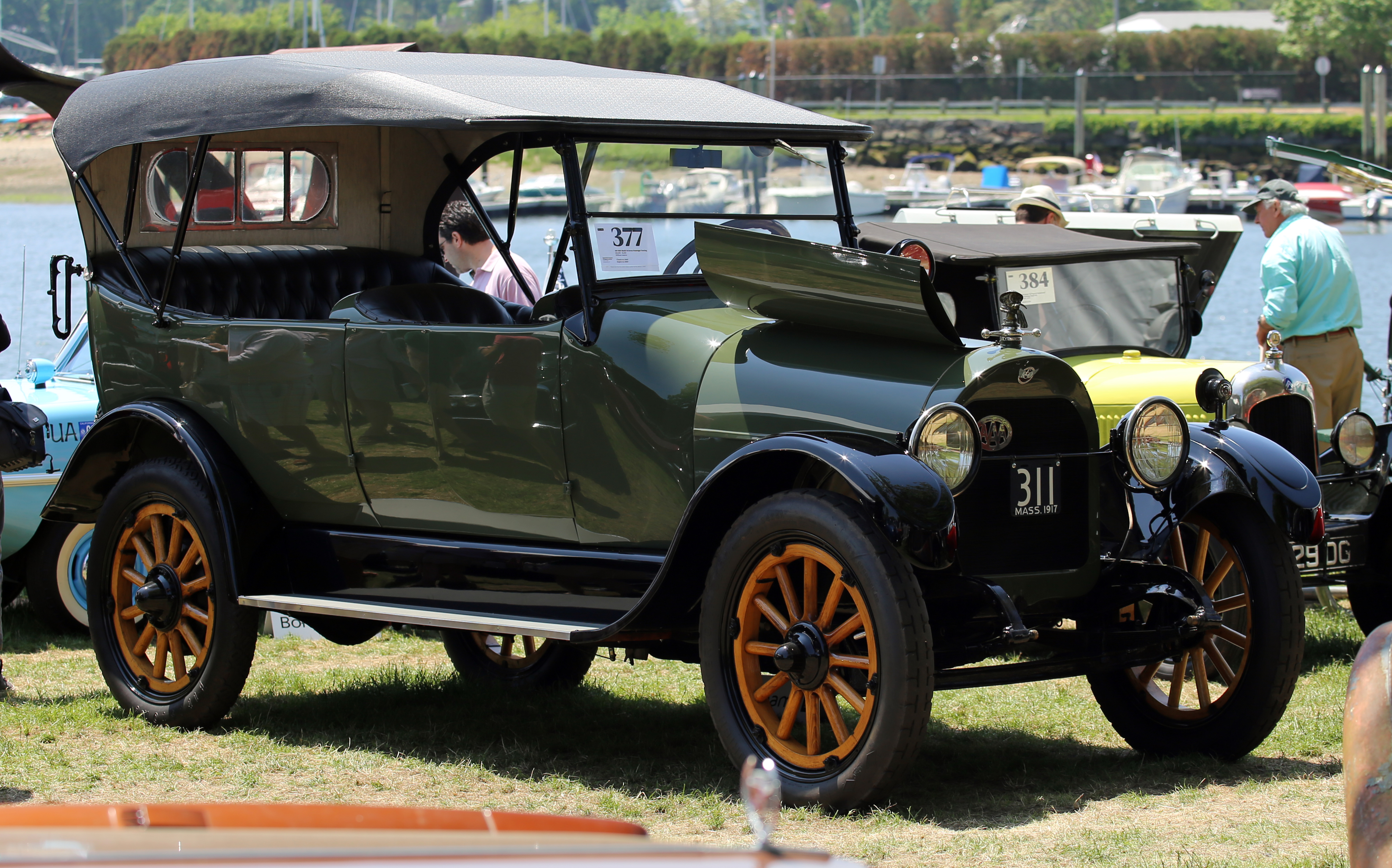
1917 Model M Touring

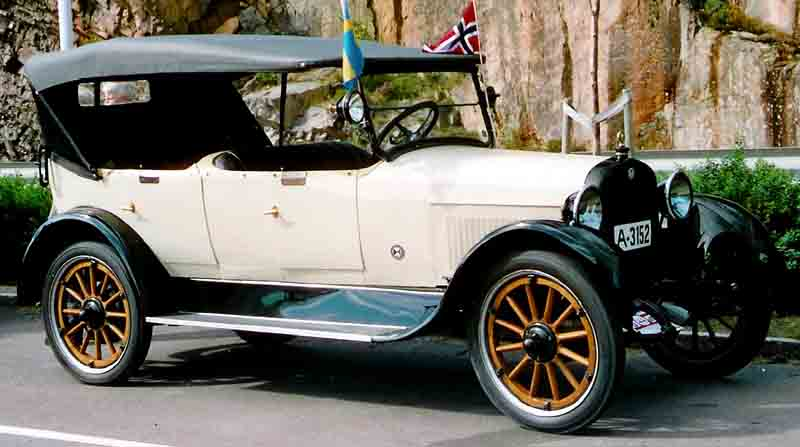
1919 REO Touring

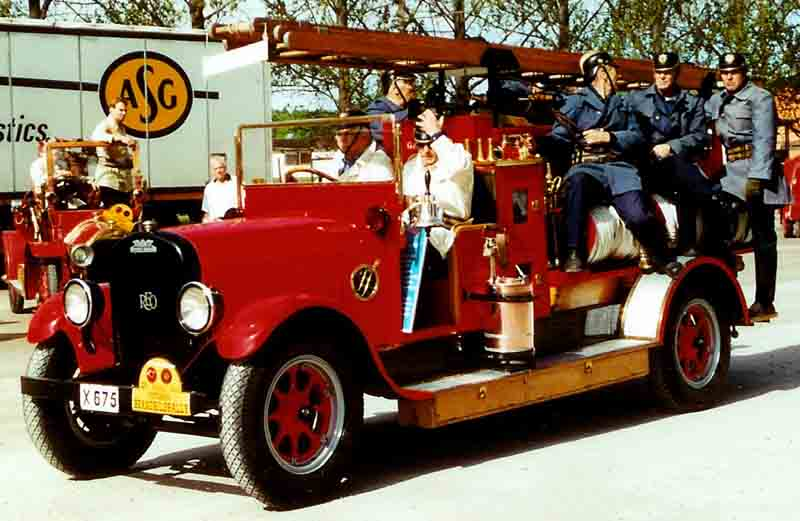
REO Fire Truck

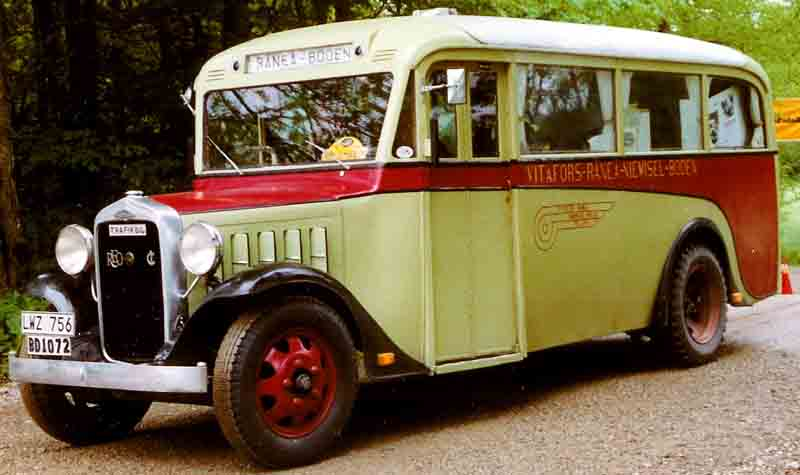
1934 REO Bus

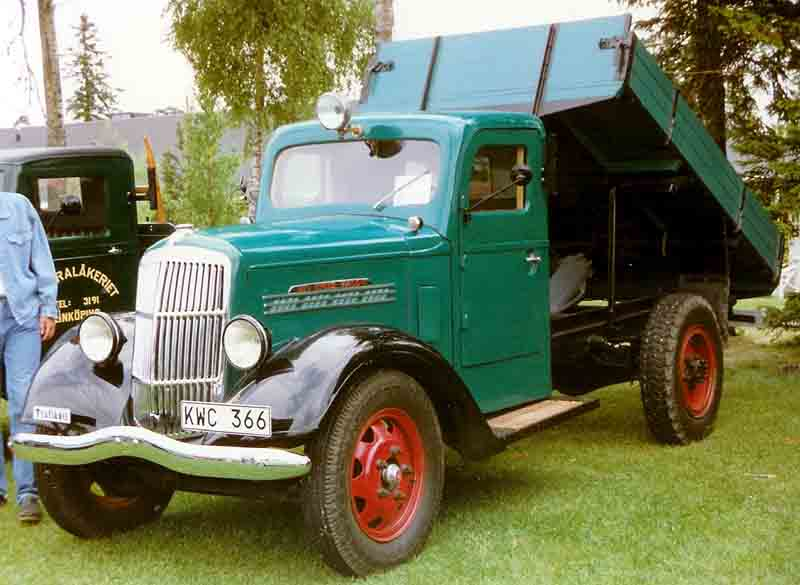
1939 REO Speed Wagon Truck

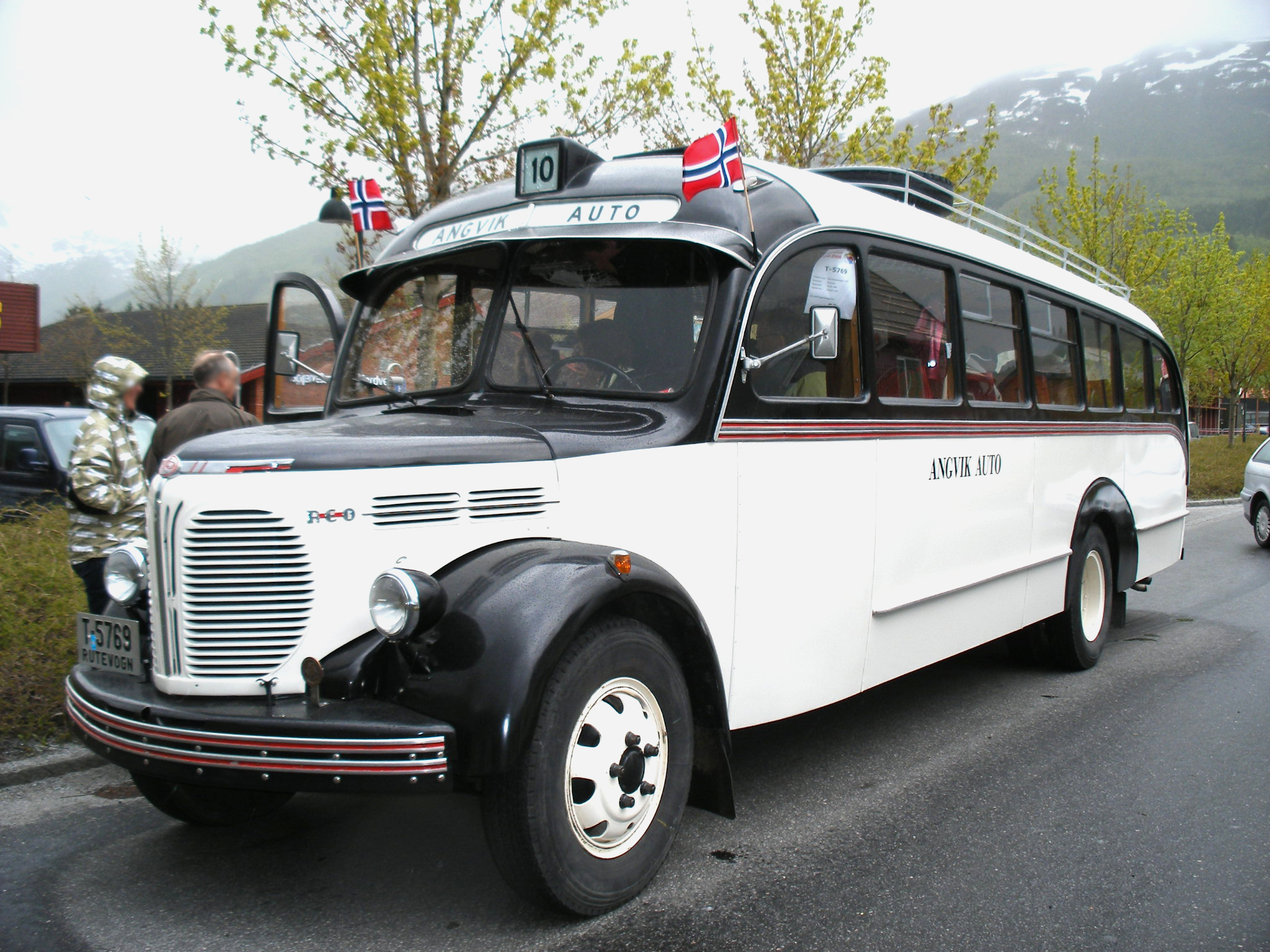
REO bus in Norway

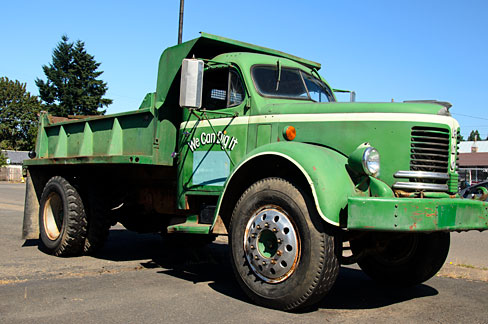
Cottage Grove Dump Truck, Lane County, Oregon

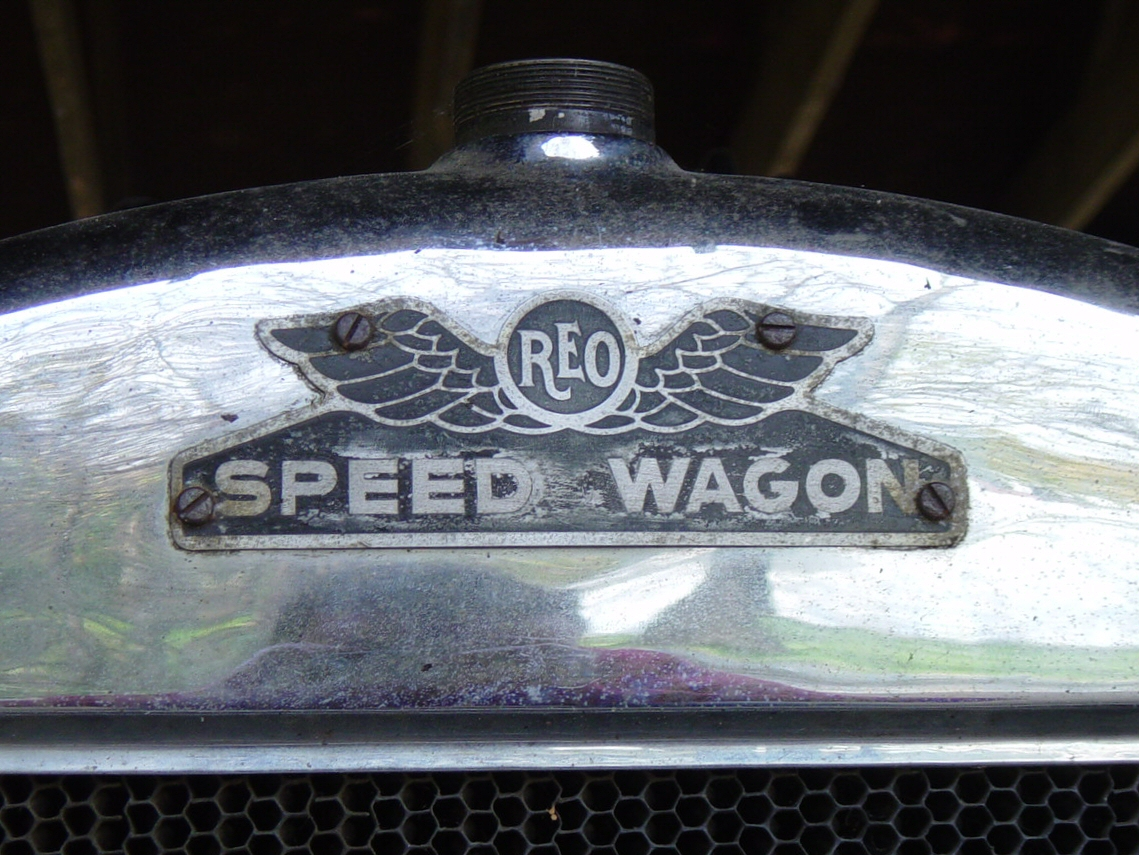
Badge from a REO Speed Wagon Fire Truck

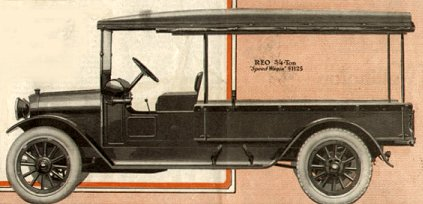
An REO Speed Wagon, from a 1917 advertisement

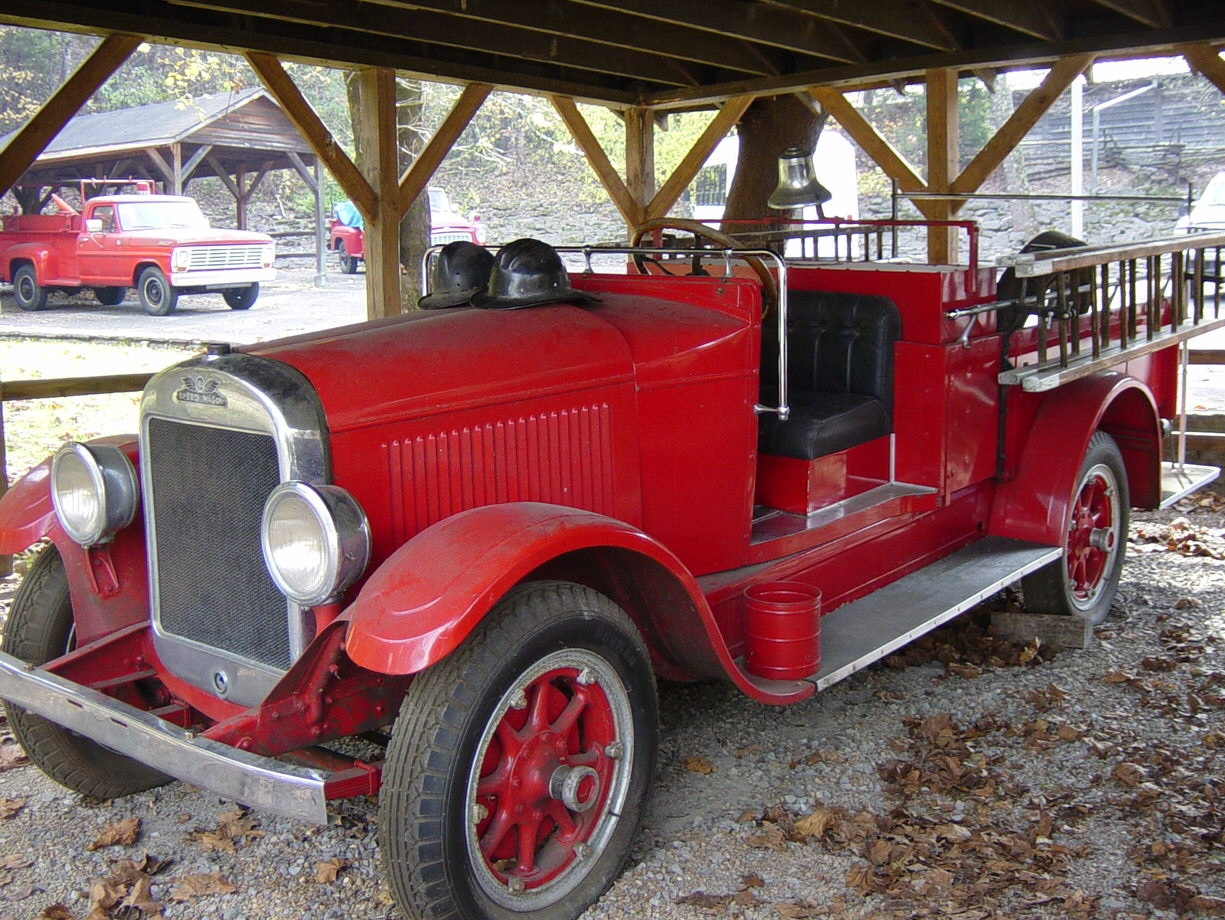
REO Speed Wagon Fire Truck at Jack Daniel's Distillery, Lynchburg, Tennessee

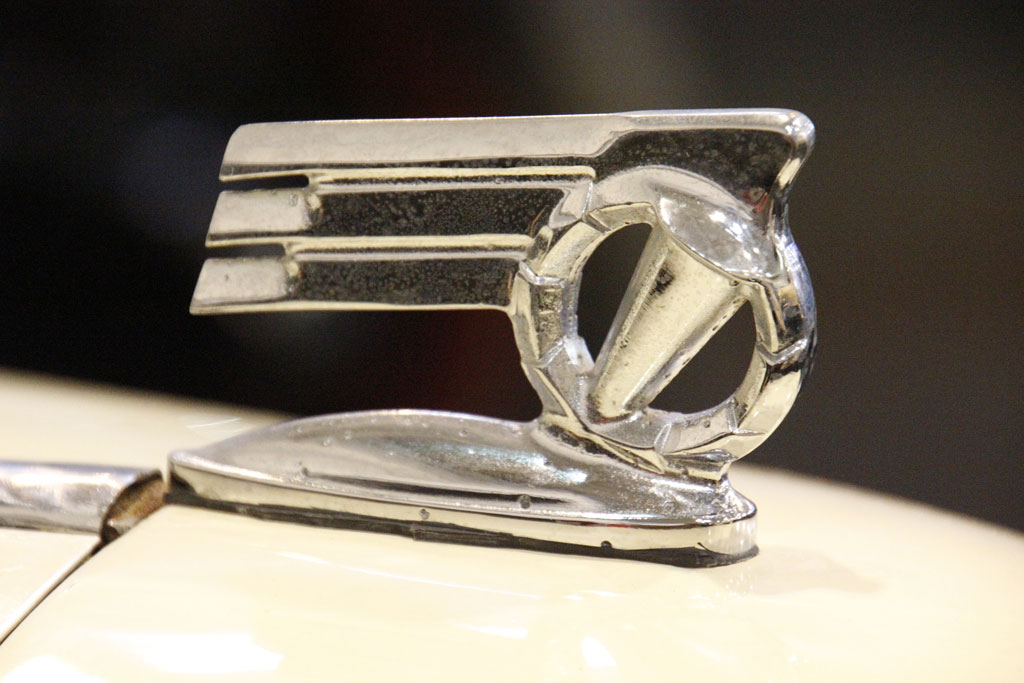
Reo Flying Cloud 4.7-litre

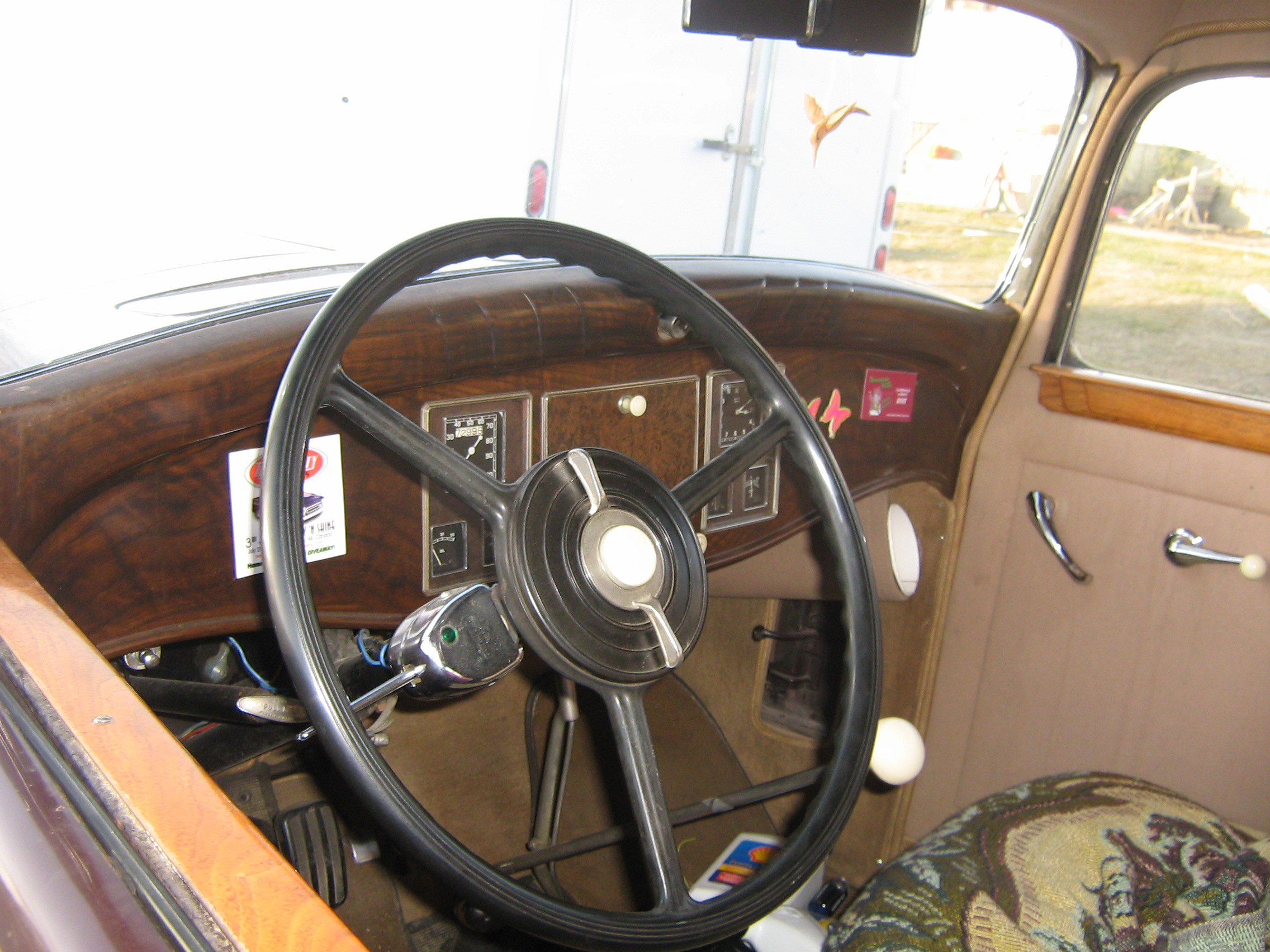
1931 Reo Royale Victoria Eight

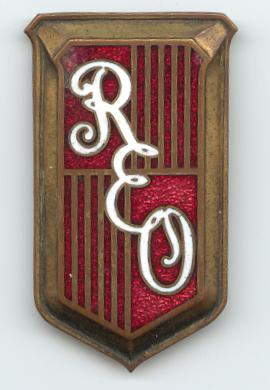
Car emblem for a Reo Flying Cloud (1930 model)

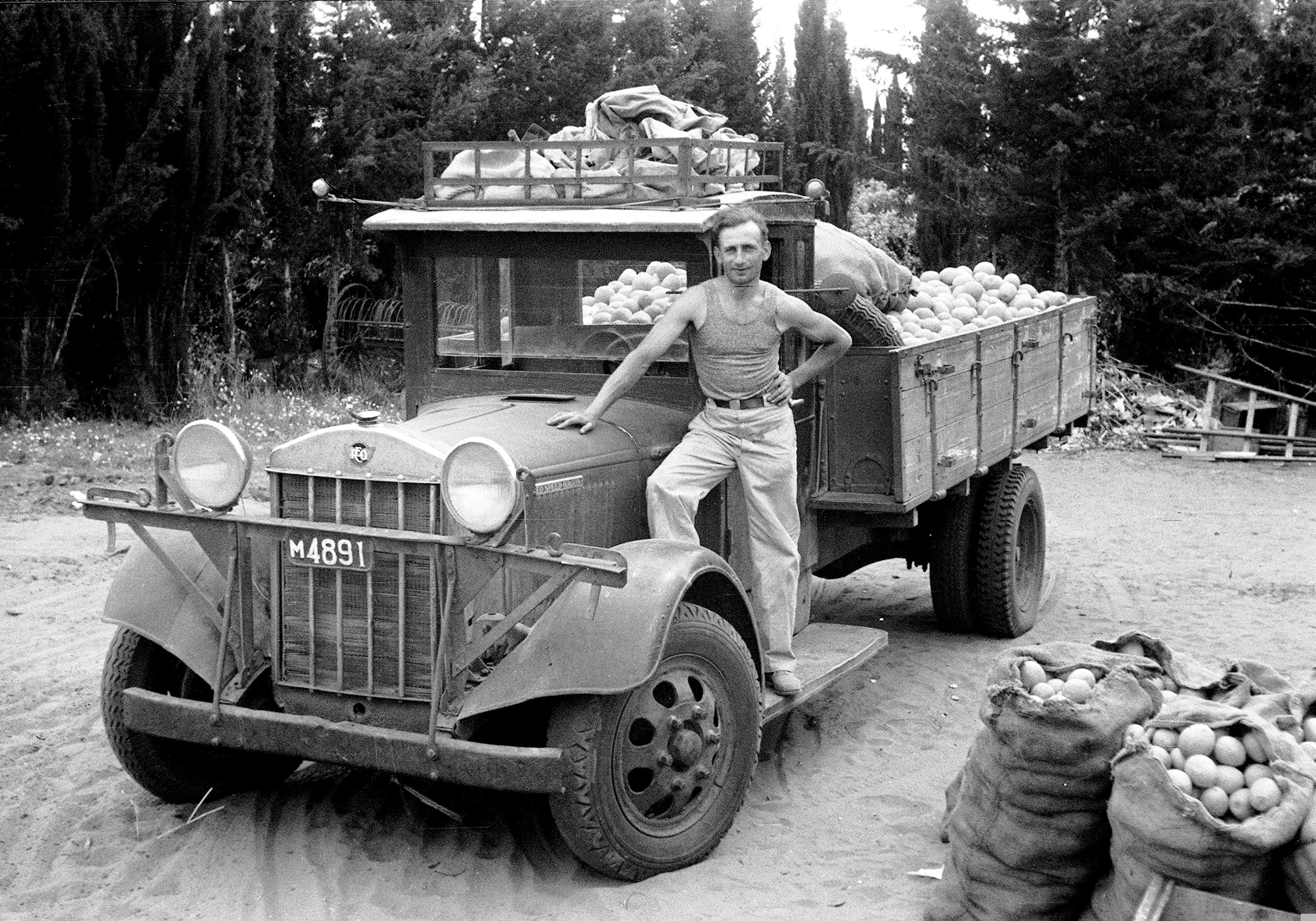
REO truck filled with citrus fruit, Kfar Saba, Mandatory Palestine, 1932

== After passenger cars ==
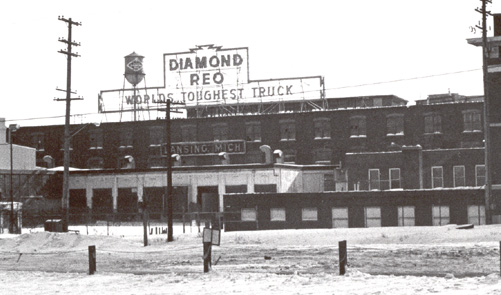
The REO factory in 1977

Although truck orders during World War II enabled it to revive somewhat, the company remained unstable in the postwar era, resulting in a bankruptcy reorganization. In 1954, the company was still underperforming, and sold its vehicle manufacturing operations (the primary asset of the company) to the Bohn Aluminum and Brass Corporation of Detroit. Three years later, in 1957, Reo's vehicle manufacturing operation became a subsidiary of White Motor Corporation White then merged REO with Diamond T Trucks in 1967 to form Diamond Reo Trucks. Volvo later took over White and thus currently owns the rights to the REO brand name.

Meanwhile, after selling Reo's vehicle manufacturing operation to Bohn in 1954, management began liquidating the remainder of the company. For tax reasons a group of shareholders successfully challenged the liquidation in a proxy fight in September 1955, and forced REO to take over a tiny nuclear services company called Nuclear Consultants, Inc. in a reverse takeover. The resulting Nuclear Corporation of America, Inc., diversified and purchased other companies to become a conglomerate, spreading into an array of fields including prefabricated housing and steel joist manufacturing in addition to nuclear services. Most of these businesses failed and the company was bankrupt again by 1966. After reorganizing, only the successful steel-joist business remained; the company started producing recycled steel and eventually renamed itself Nucor.

== Studebaker agreement ==
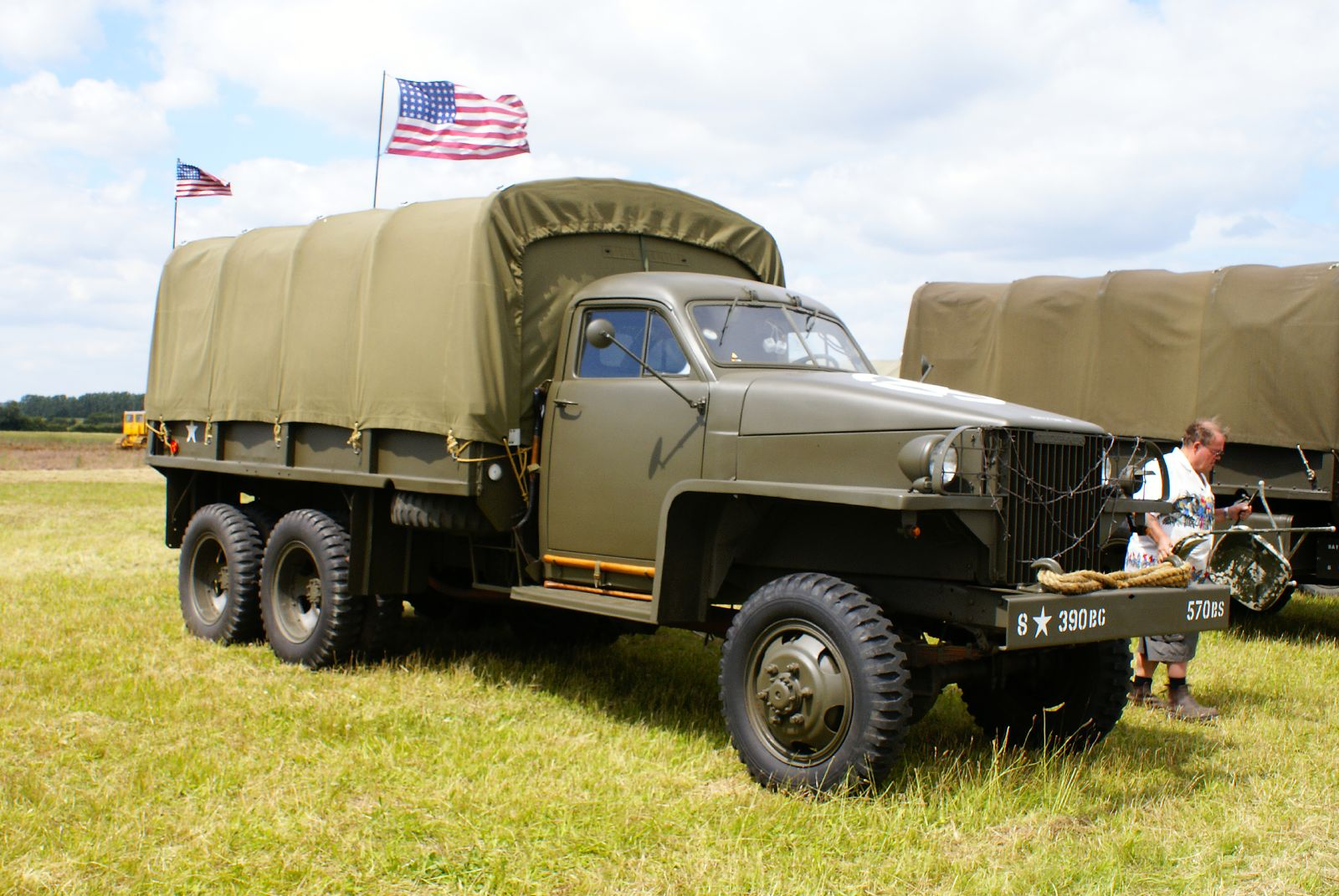
A REO US6 truck

Most Studebaker US6 trucks were built by Studebaker. However, during the Second World War, REO produced a number of them under license from Studebaker. The REO versions of the truck had some changes, such as different door handles and a more powerful engine. It is estimated that REO produced around 20,000 of these trucks and, unlike the original Studebaker trucks which were also used by the United States, the REO versions were only for export to the Soviet Union.

== Products ==
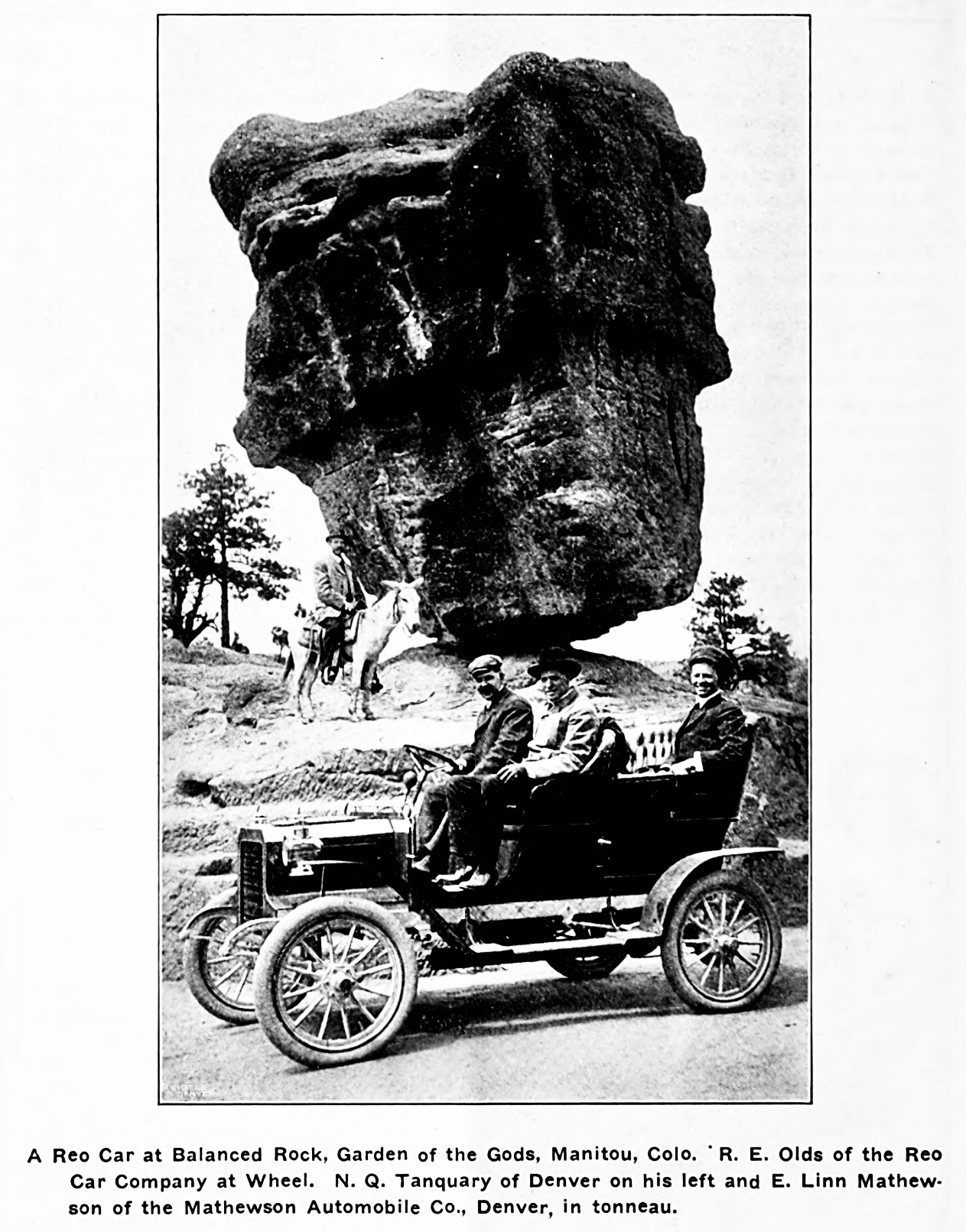
R.E. Olds at Wheel of a REO Model A

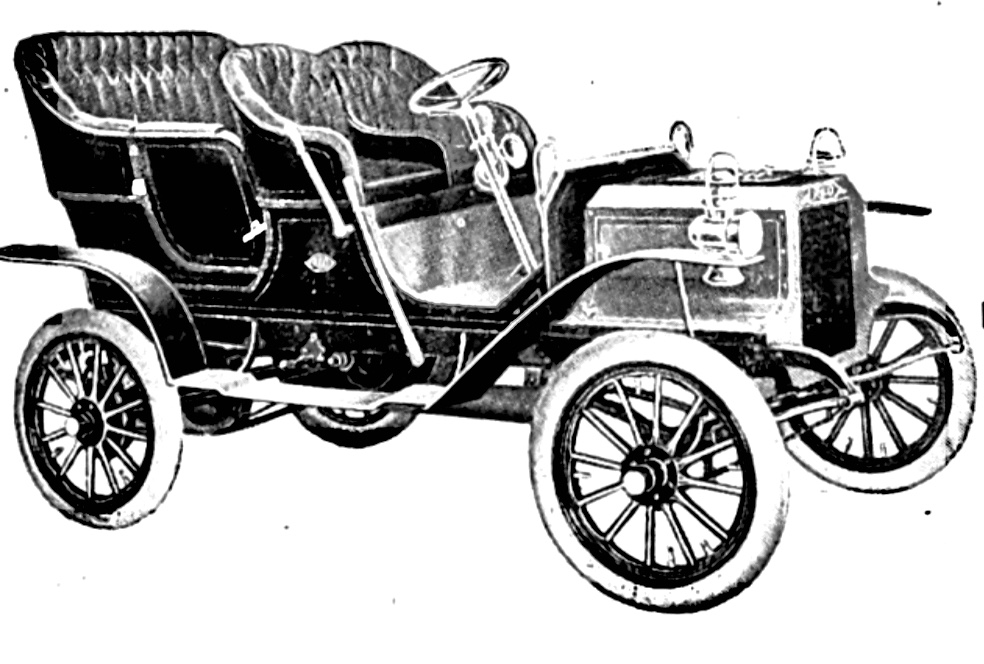
Reo Type A (16/20HP) 1905

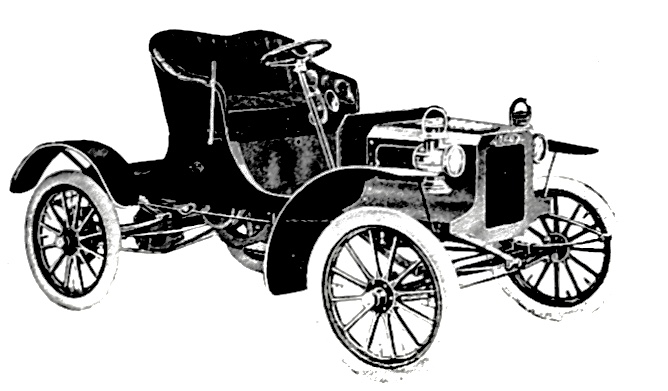
Reo Model B (1905-1908) 8 HP

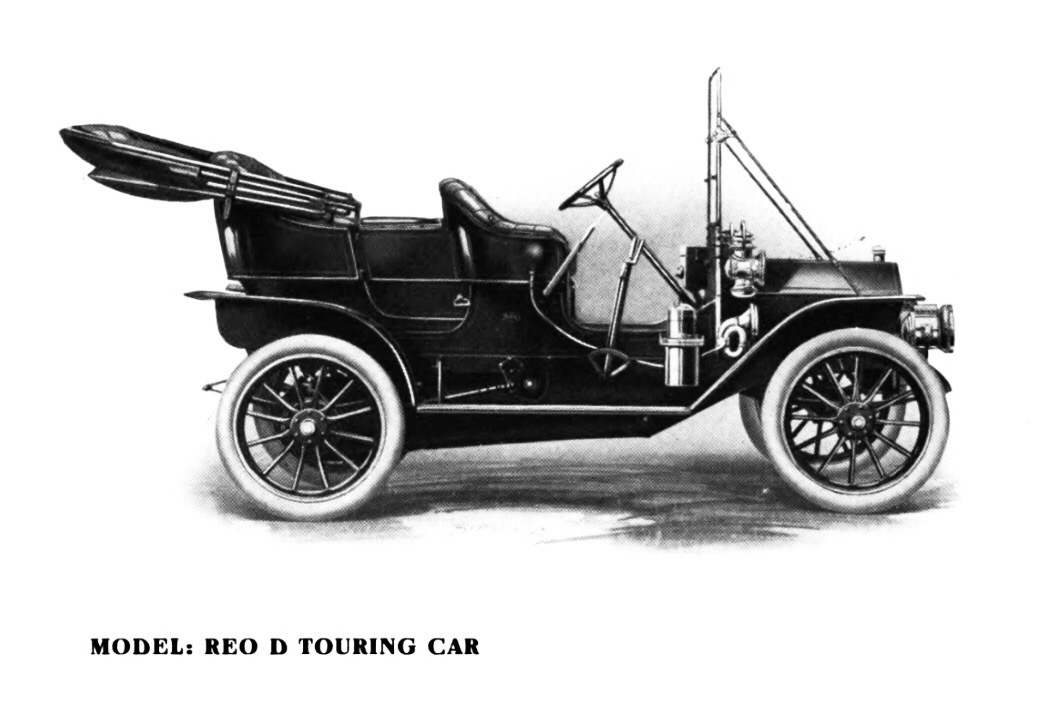
Reo Model D (1909-1910)

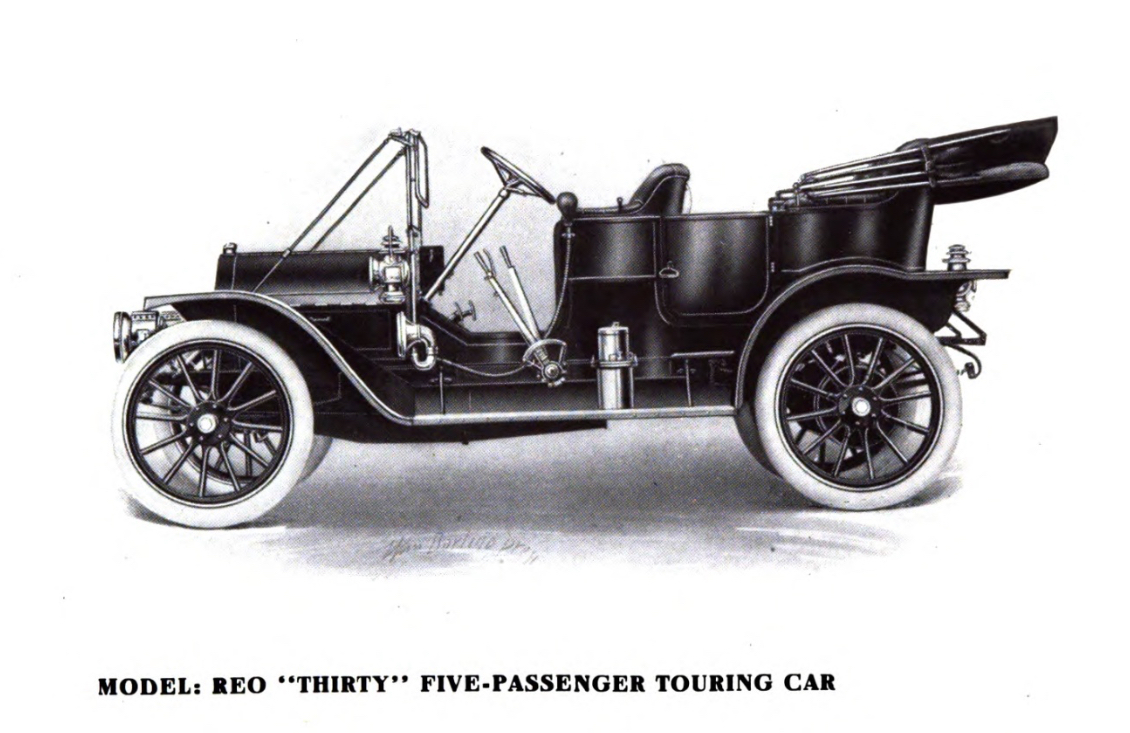
Reo Type R (1910-1911)

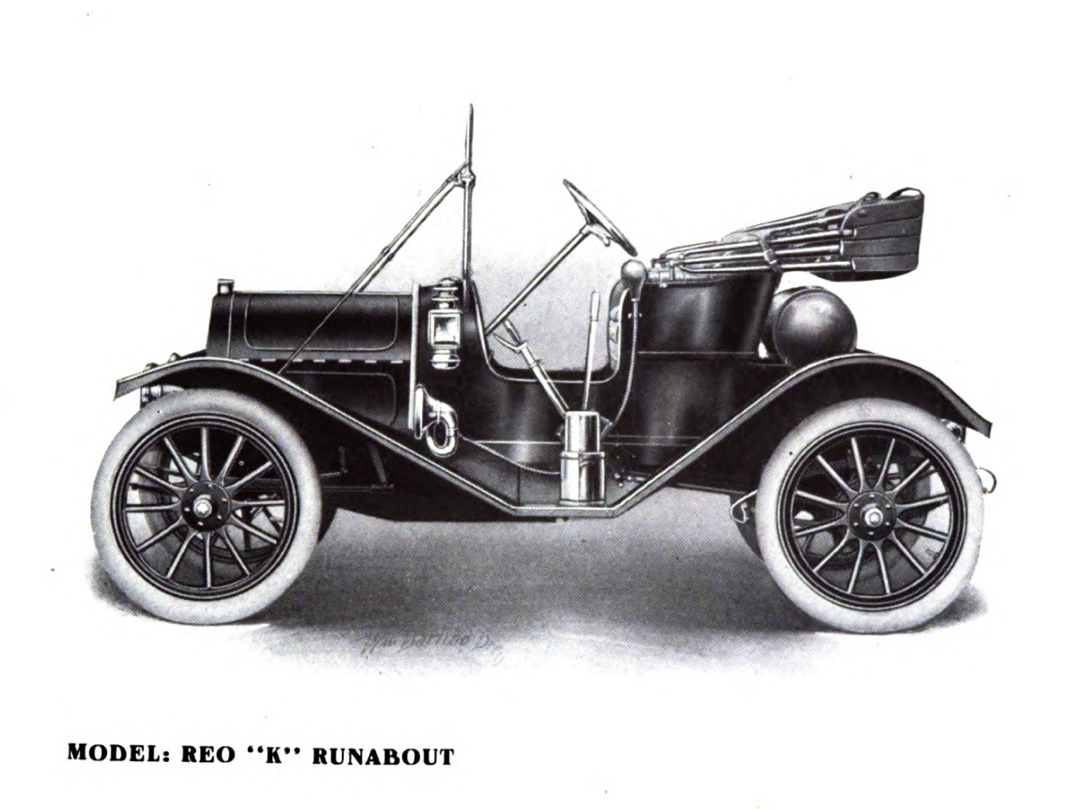
Reo Type K (1911)

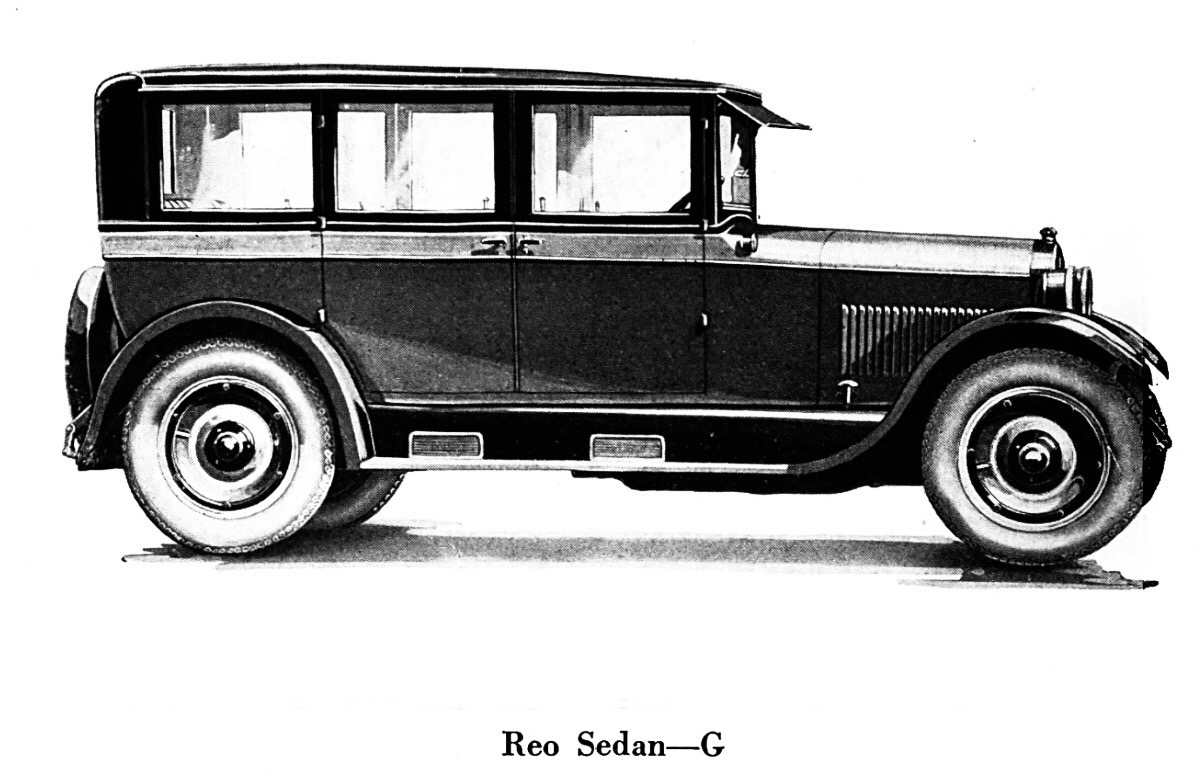
Reo Model G Sedan (1920-1926)

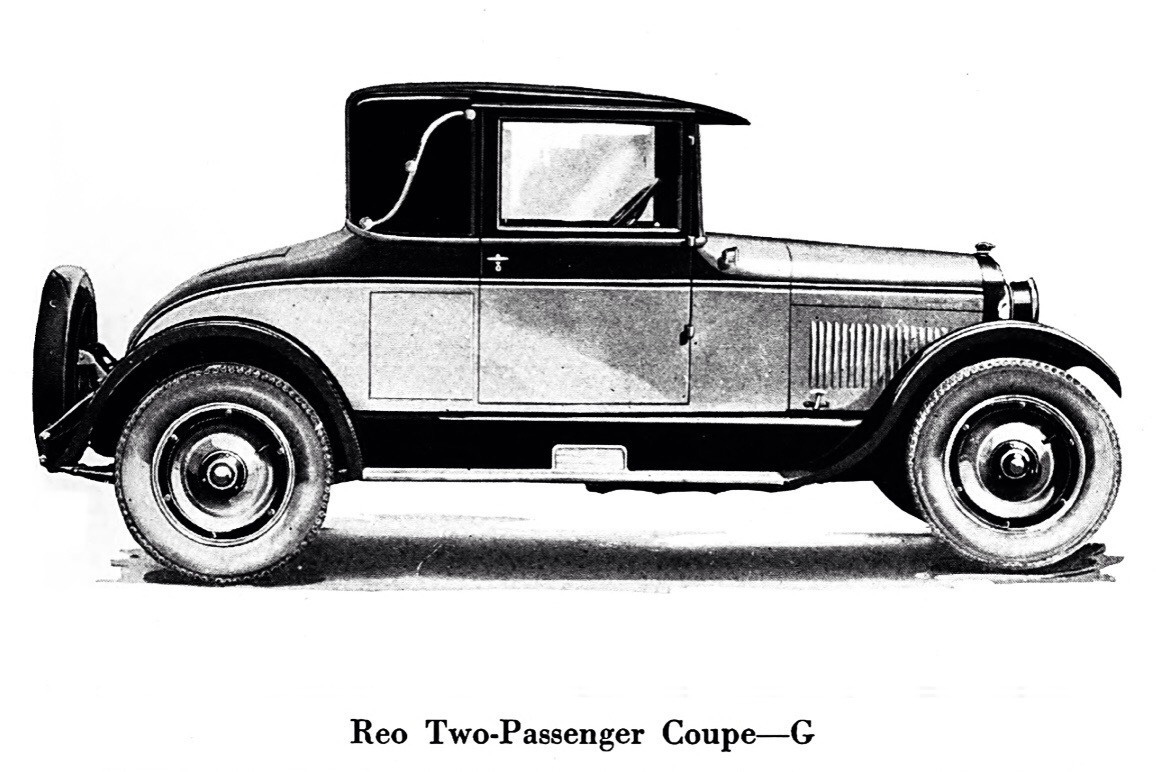
Reo Model G Coupé (1920-1926)

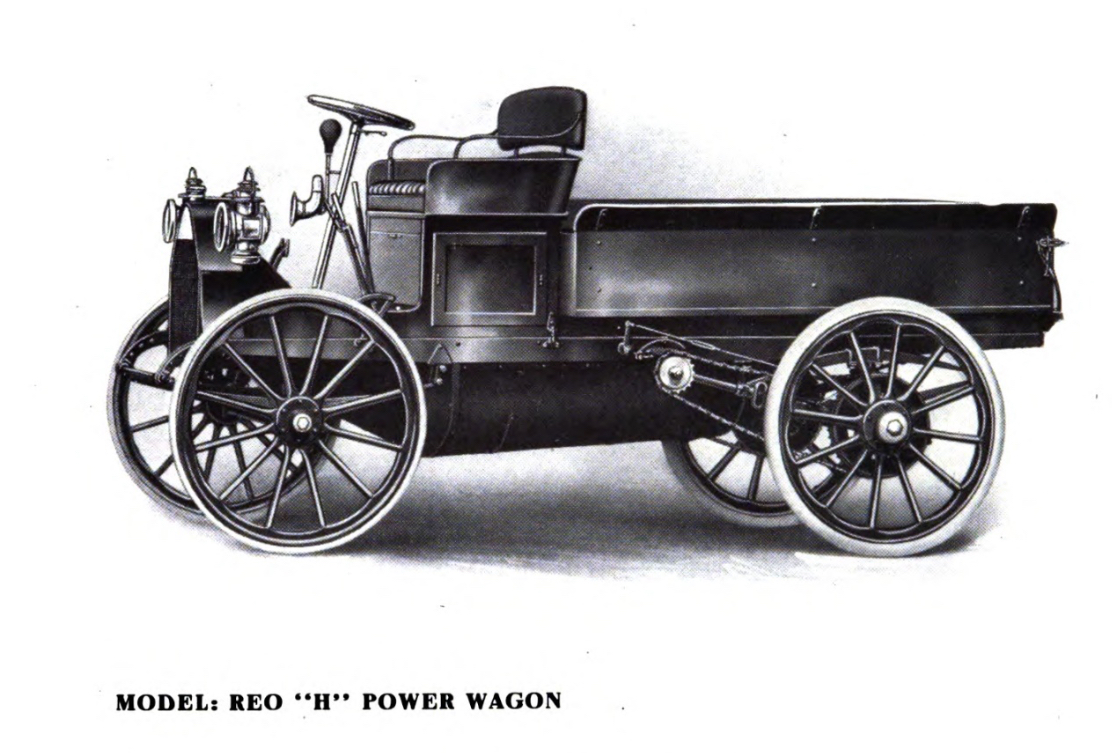
Reo Model H (1908-1915)

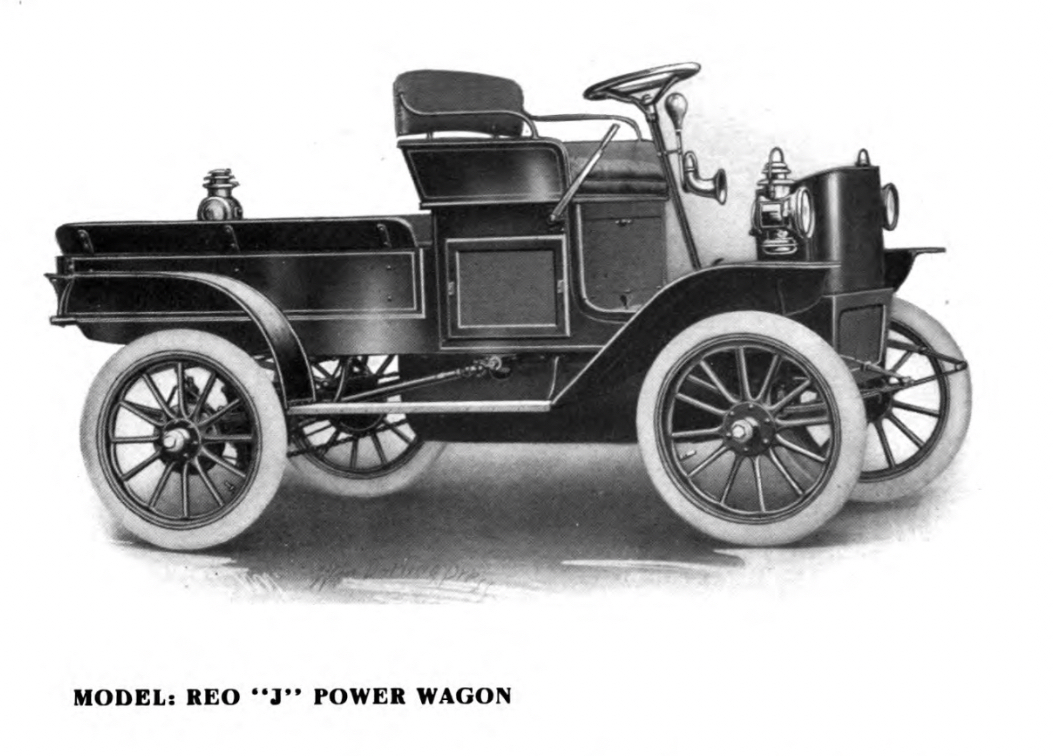
Reo Model J (1911-1919)

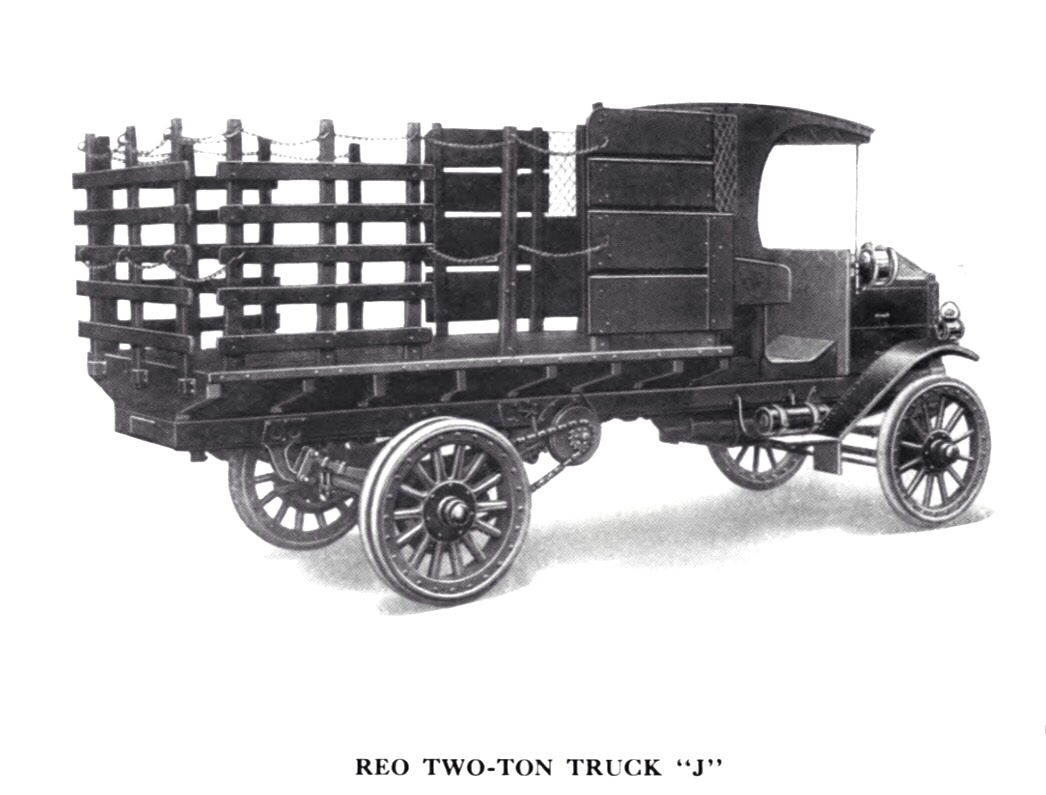
Reo Model J 2t (1911-1919)

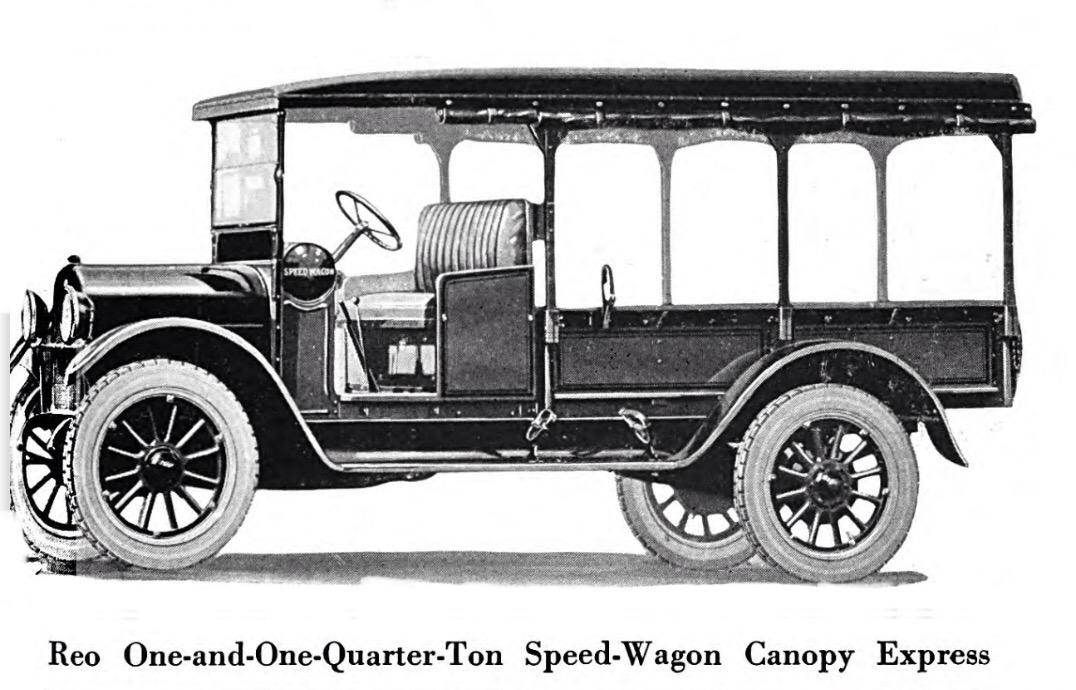
Reo Model F 1,25t (1921-1926)

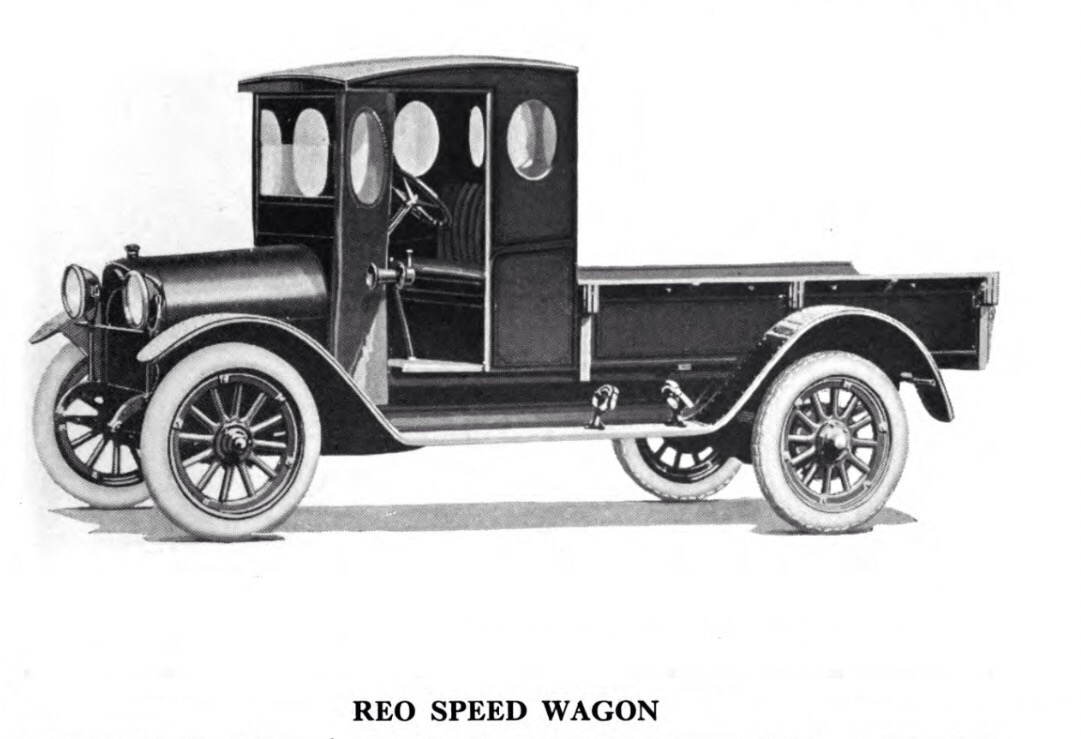
Reo Speed Wagon (1915-1953)

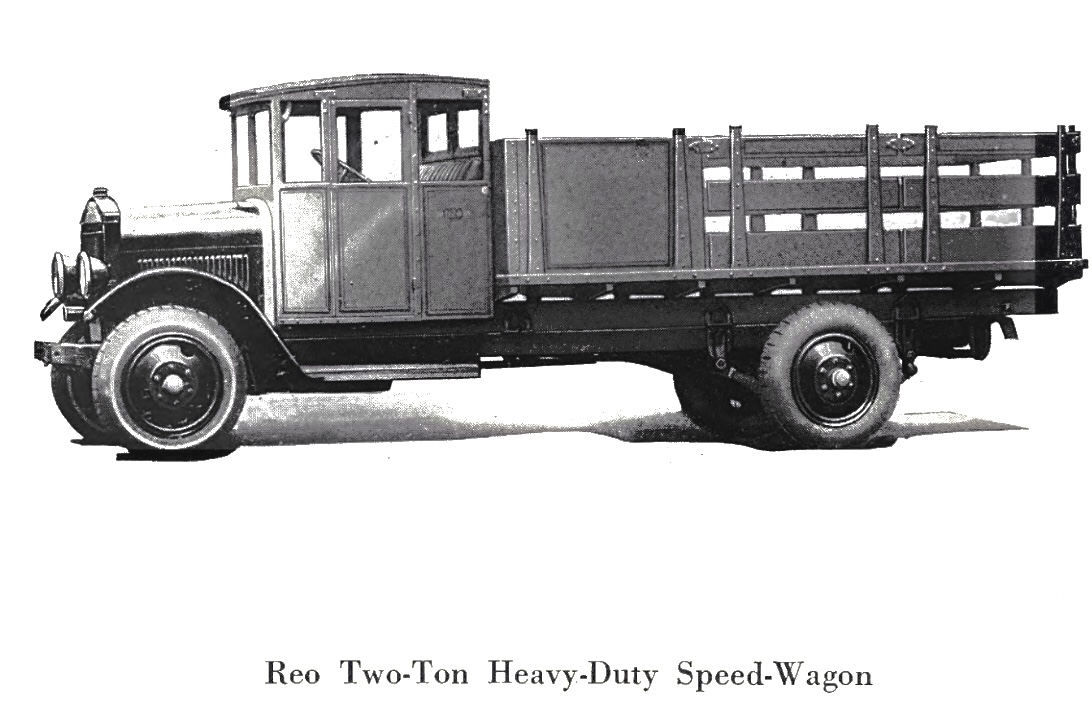
Reo Model G (1925-1927)

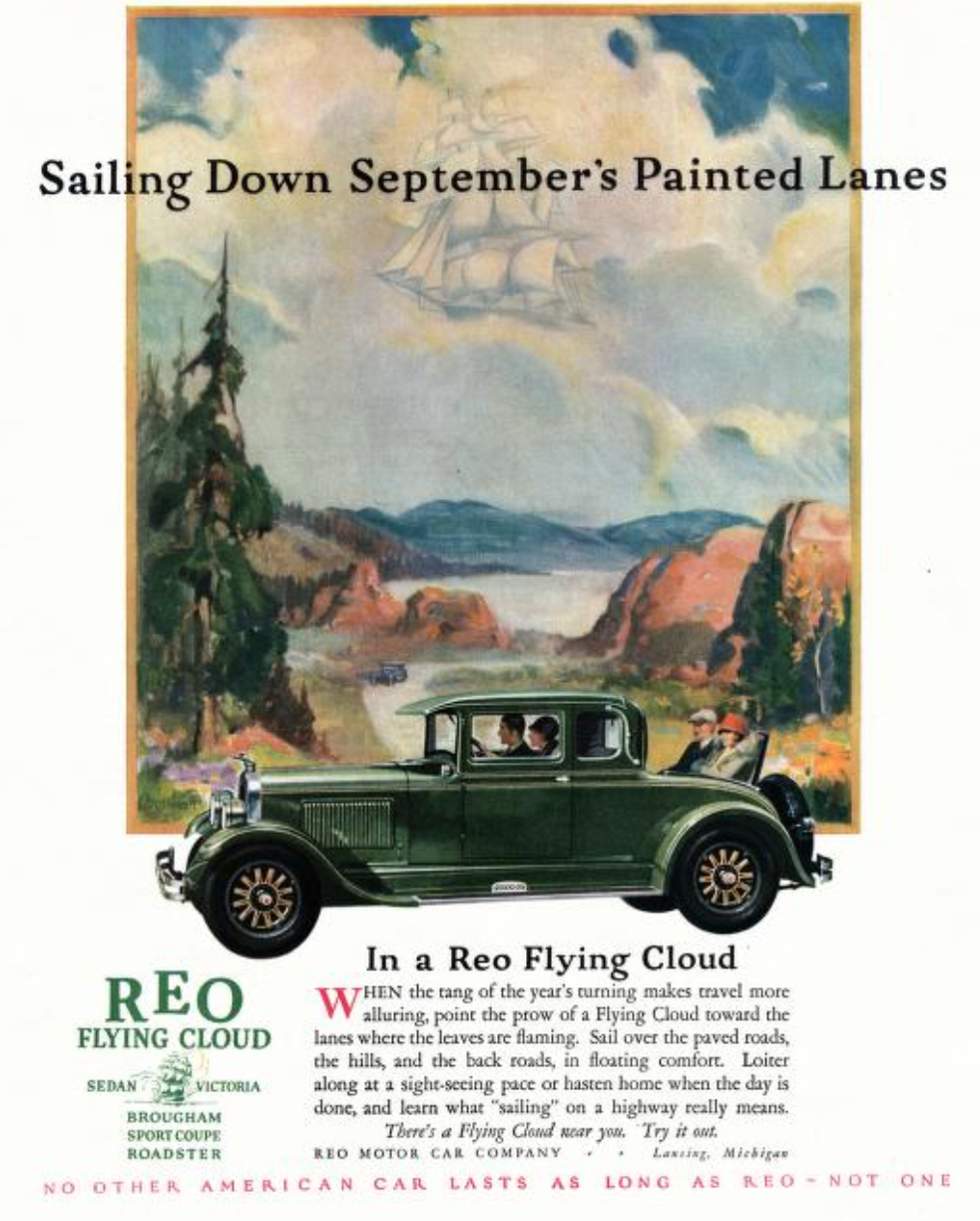
Reo Flying Cloud (1927)

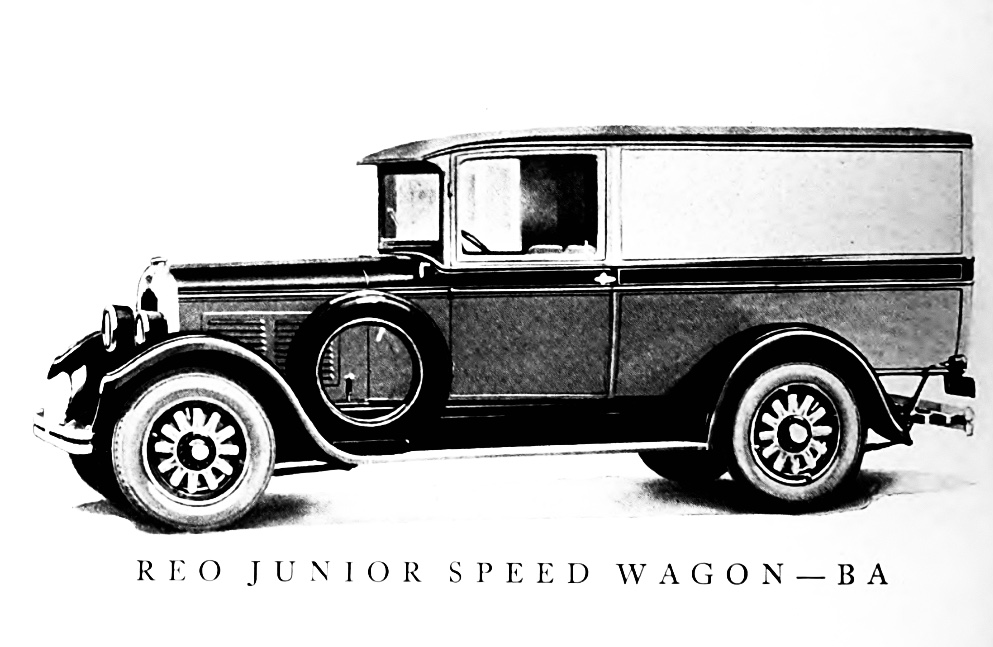
Reo Junior BA (1928-1931) based on Model 15

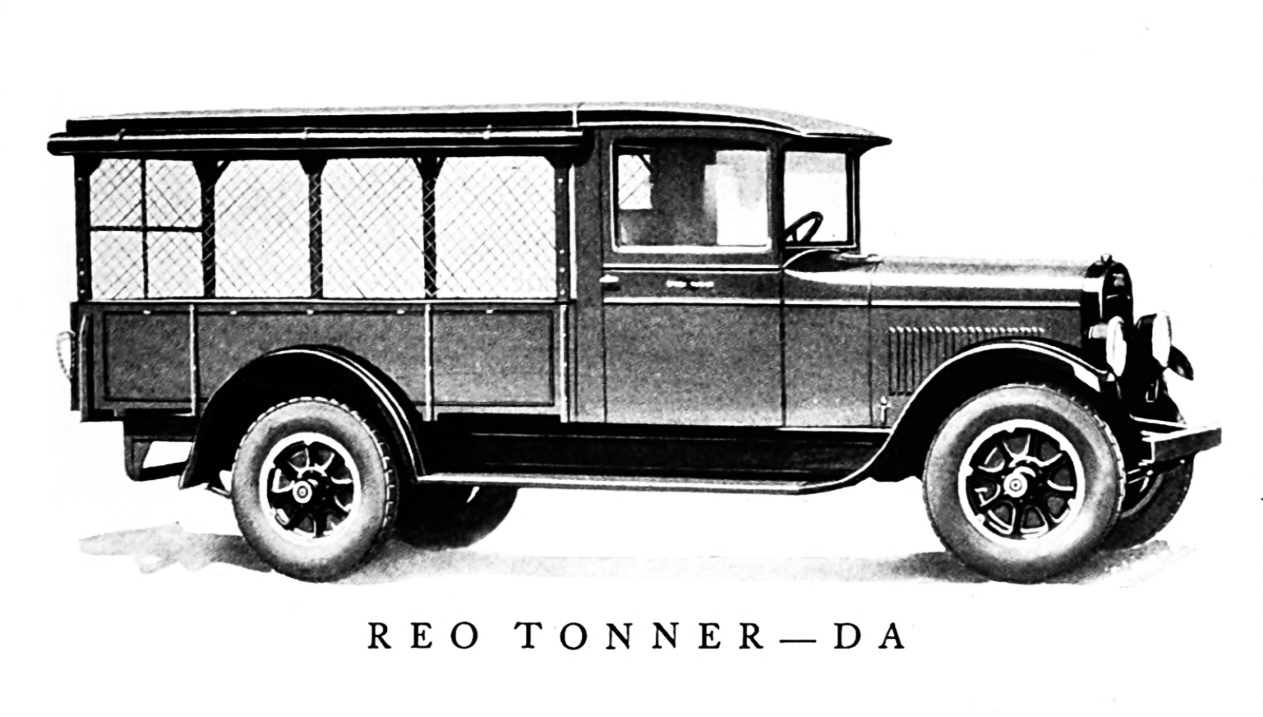
Reo DA (1928-1930)

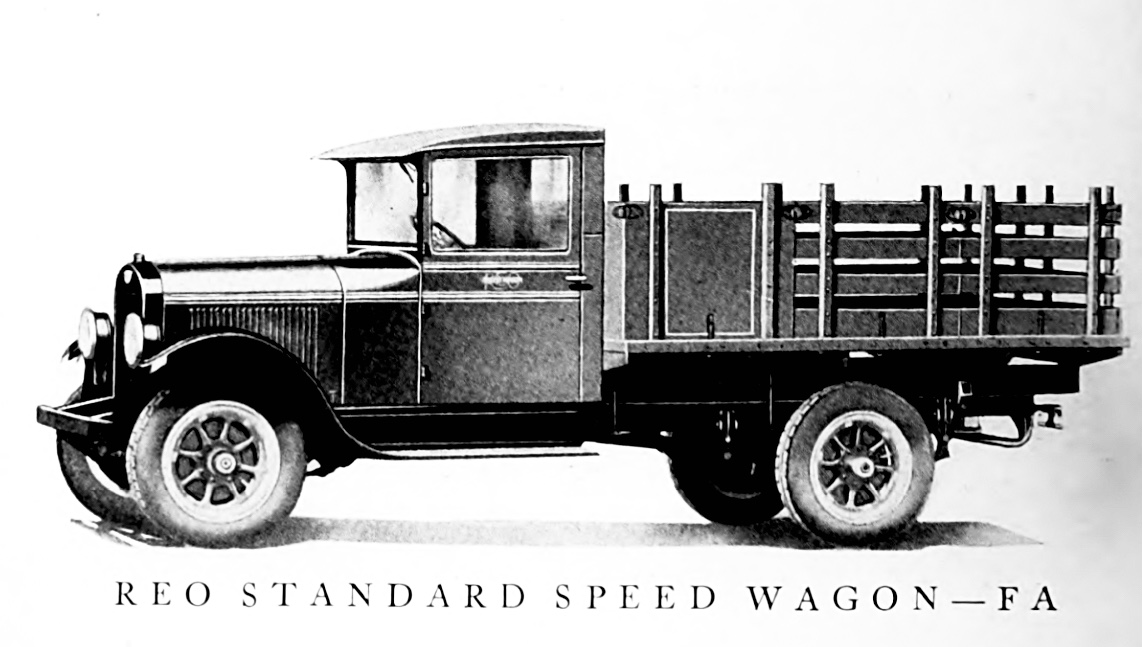
Reo FA (1928-1929)

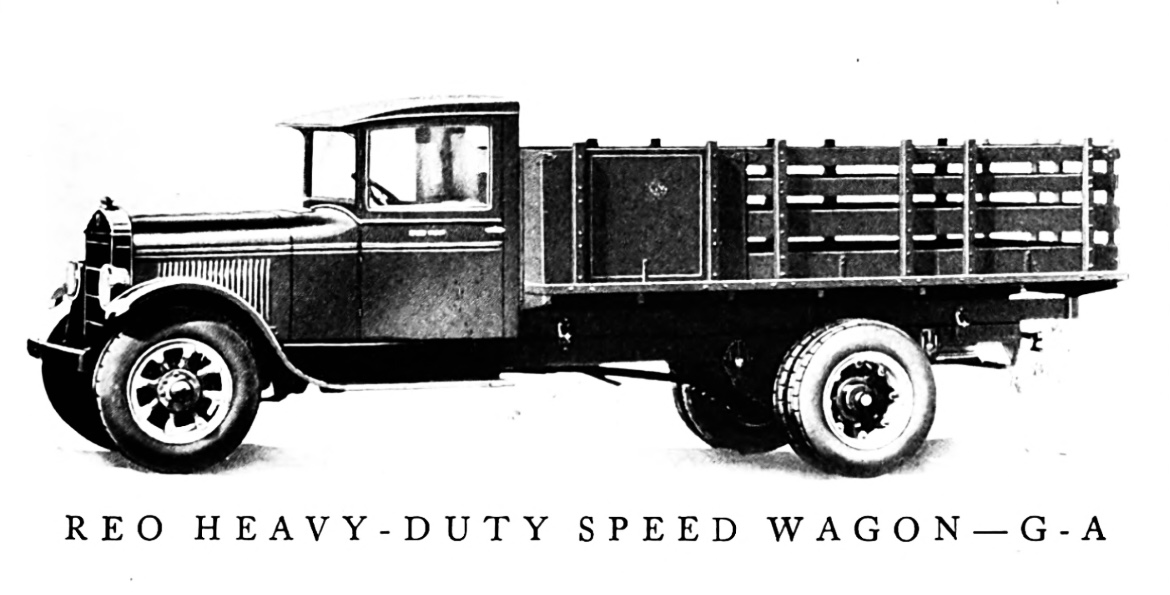
Reo GA (1928)

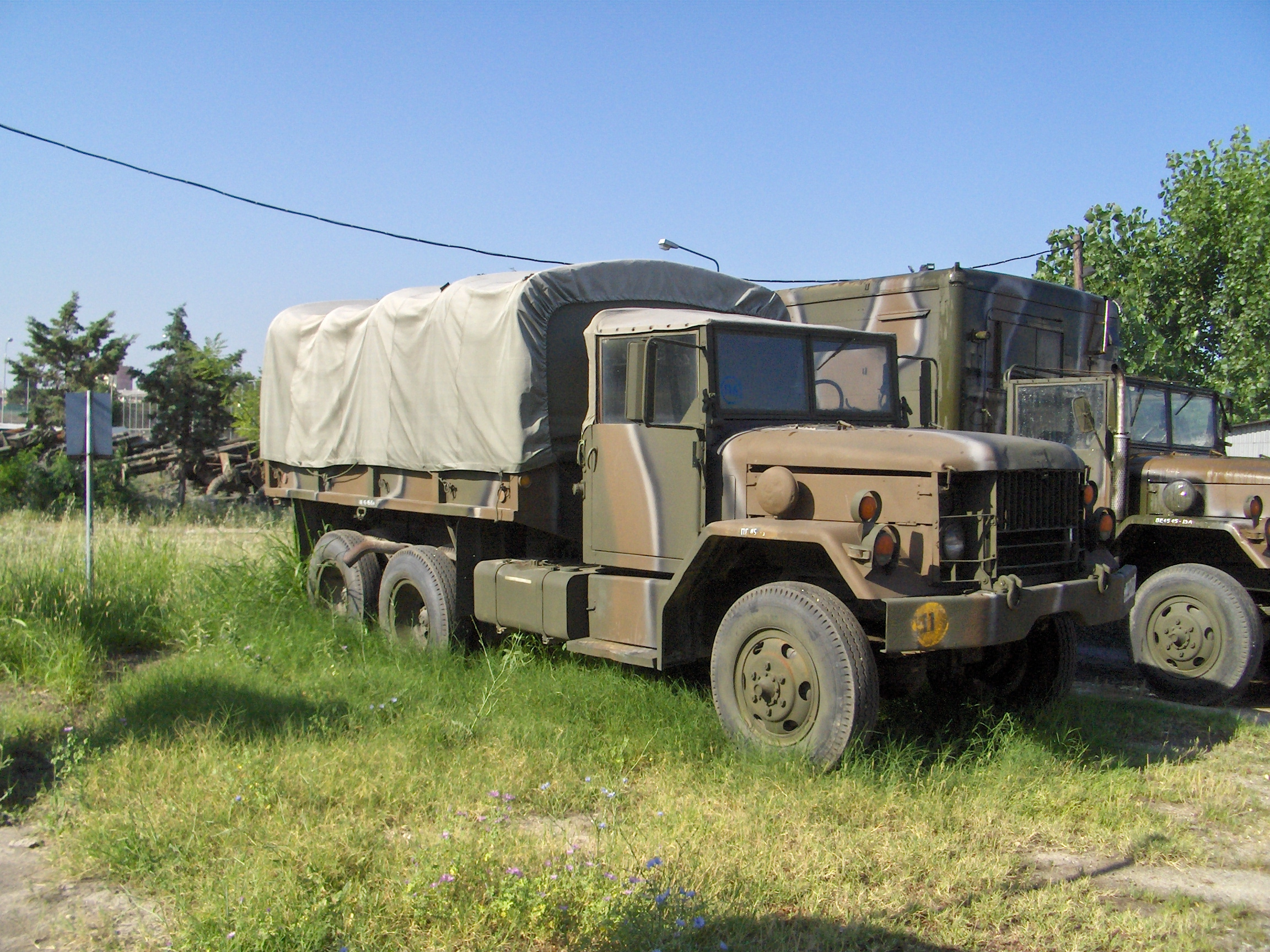
An M-35 2½-ton truck that served with the Greek Army

=== Cars ===
- Type A (1905-1908)
- Type B (1905-1908)
- Type C (1909-1910)
- Type D (1909-1910)
- Type G (1909-1910)
- Type R (1910-1911) · Thirty
- Type S (1910-1911)
- Type K (1911)
- 19 AS
- 96-T
- Comet
- DC
- Flying Cloud ·
- Flying Cloud Mate
- GB
- Gold Comet
- M-109
- M-34
- M-35
- M-35 A1
- M-48
- M-49
- M-50
- M-52
- M-Series
- M-246
- R-5 "Reo the Fifth" (1912)
- Royale
- Royale Elite
- Runabout
- T-6 (1920-1926)

=== Trucks ===
- H (1908-1915) 0,75 t
  - 1 Cylinder; 1742 cc
    - 1914 Produktion < 200 Vehicles; Serial Number 2101 to 2300
    - 1915 Production < 200 Vehicles; Serial Number 2301 to 2500
- J (1911-1919) 2t
  - 4 Cylinder, 3942 cc
    - 1914 Production < 1154 Vehicles; Serial Number 3351 to 4504
    - 1915 Production < 846 Vehicles; Serial Number 4505 to 5350
- F (1915-1920) 0,75 t
  - 4 Cylinder, 3942 cc
    - 1915 Production < 1000 Vehicles; Serial Number 10000 to 11000
    - 1916 Production < 1789 Vehicles; Serial Number 11001 to 12789
    - 1917 Production < 5210 Vehicles; Serial Number 12790 to 17999
    - 1918 Production < 3730 Vehicles; Serial Number 18001 to 21730
    - 1919 Production < 8170 Vehicles; Serial Number 21731 to 29900
    - 1920 Production < 10997 Vehicles; Serial Number 29901 to 40897
- F (1921-1926) 1,25 t
  - 4 Cylinder, 3942 cc
    - 1921 Production < 16651 Vehicles; Serial Number 45350 to 62000
    - 1922 Production < 13600 Vehicles; Serial Number 62001 to 75600
    - 1923 Production < 17699 Vehicles; Serial Number 75601 to 93299
    - 1924 Production < 14502 Vehicles; Serial Number 93299 to 107800
- V (1922-1924) 0,75 t
  - 4 Cylinder, 3942 cc
    - 1922 Production < 225 Vehicles; Serial Number 1 to 225
    - 1923 Production < 625 Vehicles; Serial Number 225 to 849
    - 1924 Production < 1309 Vehicles; Serial Number 849 to 2157
- F 150 HD (1925) 1,75 t
- F 128 HD (1925) 1,75 t
- V6 (1925-1926) 0,75 t
- V4 (1925-1926) 0,75 t
- G (1925-1927) 2 t
- 19 AS
- AC
- Apollo
- Reo Junior BA
- Comet
- DA
- DC
- FA
- GA (1927-1928) 3 t
- GB (1927) 3t
- Giant
- Gold Comet
- M35
- Raider
- Royale
- Speed Wagon
- Speed Delivery
- Speed Tanker

Year	Production	Model
1946		
1947	22,689	
1948	11,524	
1949	3,532	
1950	9,291	
1951	14,856	
1952	17,130	
1953	15,259	
1954	7,203	
1955	5,190	
1956	3,789	
1957	1,602	June 57, thereafter included in White
1958	0	

=== Buses ===
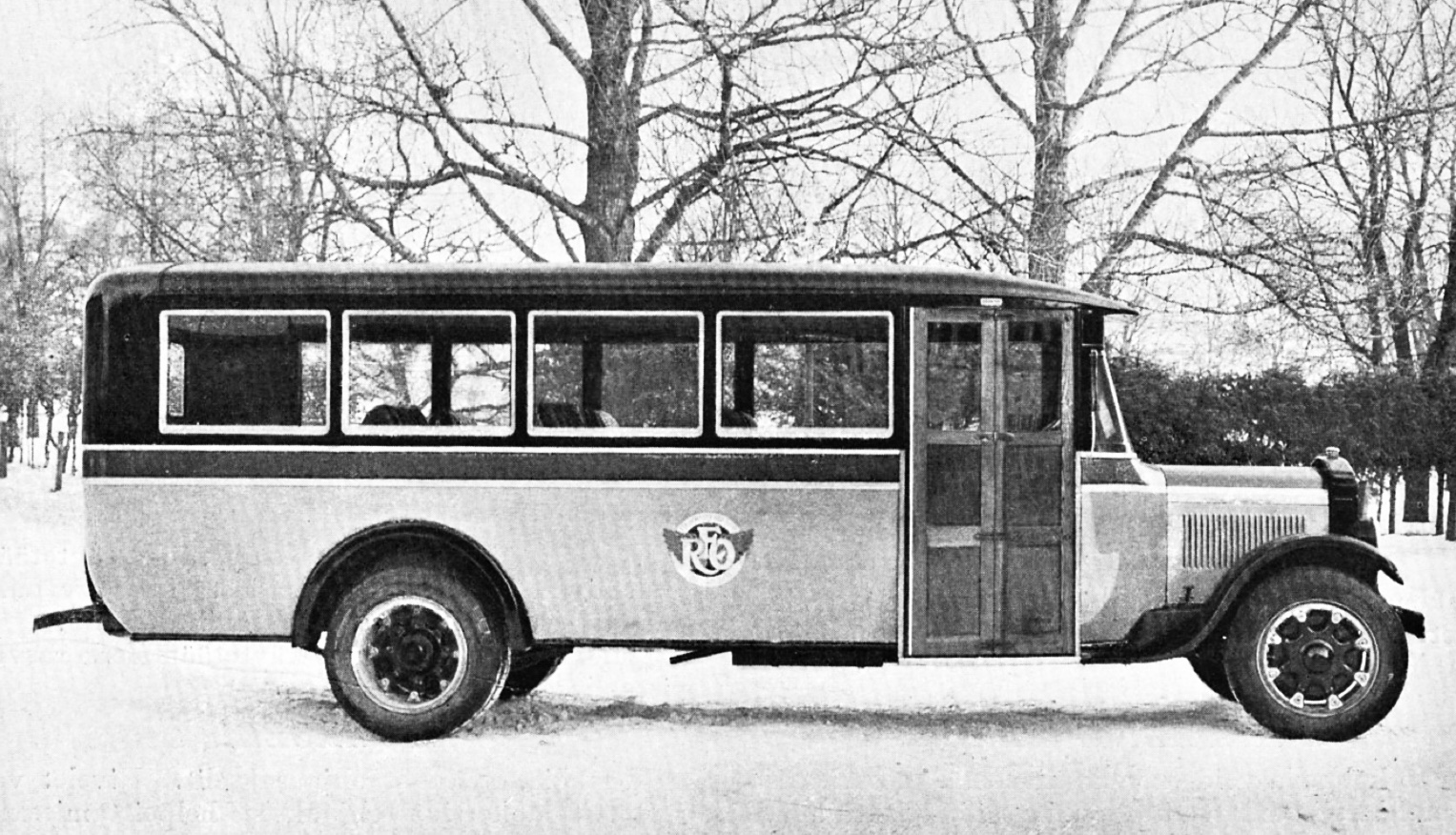
REO Omnibus Typ A; 22 passengers (1928)

- W 2 (1924)
- REO Omnibus 12 passengers Sedan (1928)
- REO Omnibus 12 passengers Post (1928)
- REO Omnibus 18 passengers (1928)
- REO Omnibus 20 passengers Sedan (1928)
- REO Omnibus Typ A 22 passengers (1928)
- REO Omnibus Typ B 22 passengers (1928)
- REO Omnibus 28 passengers City (1928)
- REO Omnibus 32 passengers Post (1934)
- 96HTD
- W series
- Gold Comet

== Clients ==
- Toronto Transportation Commission
- Israel Defense Forces

== In popular culture ==
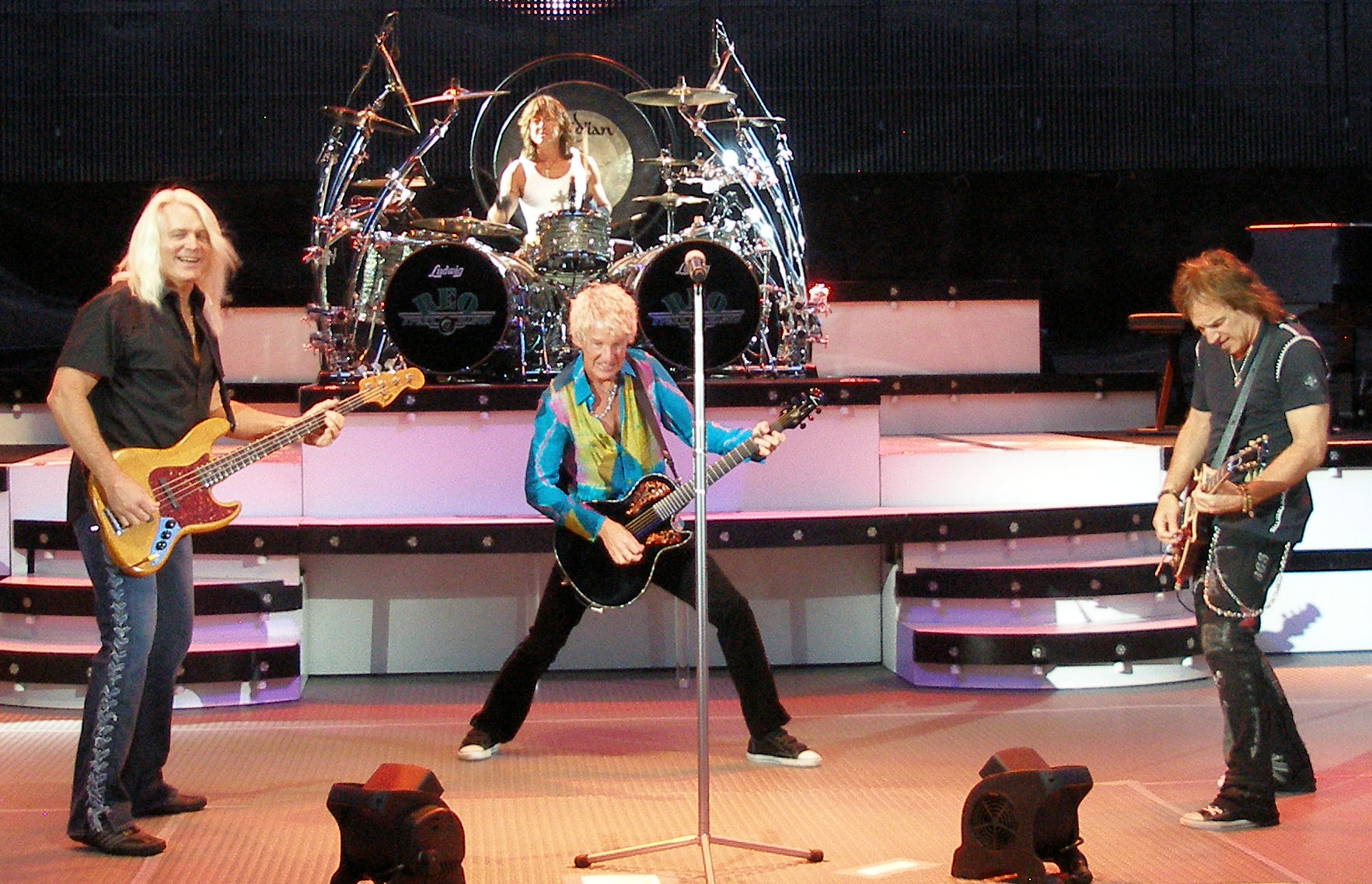
American band REO Speedwagon took their name from the homonymous vehicle.

The 1971 movie Big Jake featured REO motor cars.

- The band REO Speedwagon took their name from the REO Speed Wagon light delivery truck, an ancestor of pickup trucks.
- The band Diamond Rio took their name from REO's successor company Diamond Reo Trucks. The band misspelled "Reo" as "Rio", but lead singer Marty Roe decided to make a virtue out of his mistake, saying "I like it like that. It has a country-Southwestern flavor".
- A REO is mentioned in a humorous 1933 short story The Car We Had to Push by James Thurber. It tells the story of Thurber’s family car, which would only start if pushed a long way. After several odd adventures, the car is destroyed by a trolley car.
- The Barnum & Bailey Circus exhibited sideshow performers, Tiny Tim and Tom Thumb, driving a scaled-down version of the 1906 Reo Model-A Light Touring Car known as the "Baby Reo".
- Travel writer Robert Byron mentions a brand-new REO Speed Wagon as one of the more enjoyable rides in his voyage from Iran to Afghanistan between 1933 and 1934.

== Advertisements ==
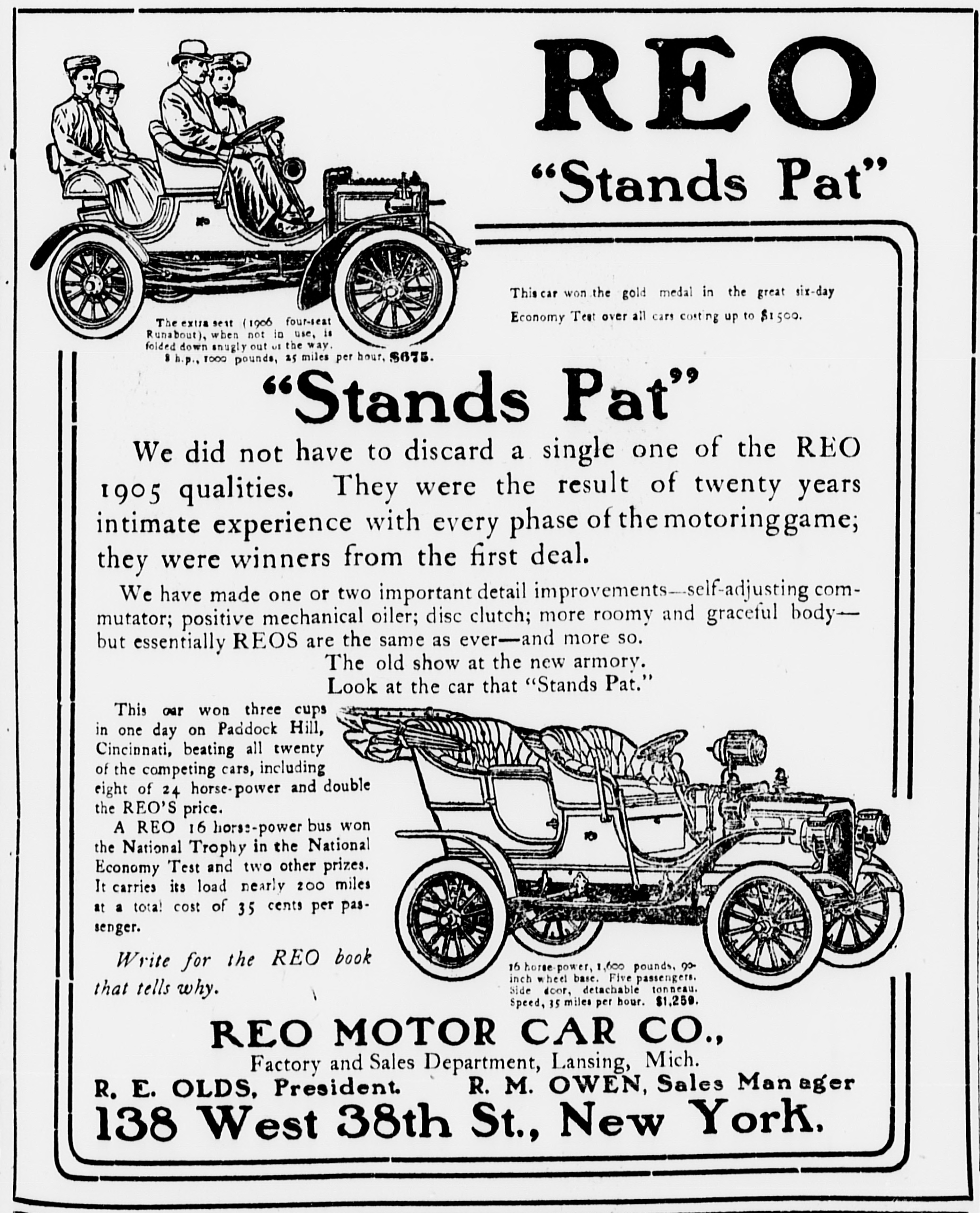
1906 REO advertisement

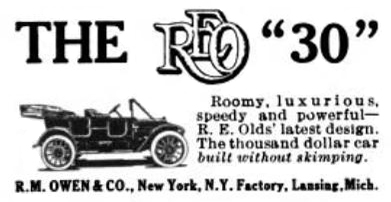
1912 REO advertisement. R. M. Owens & Co.

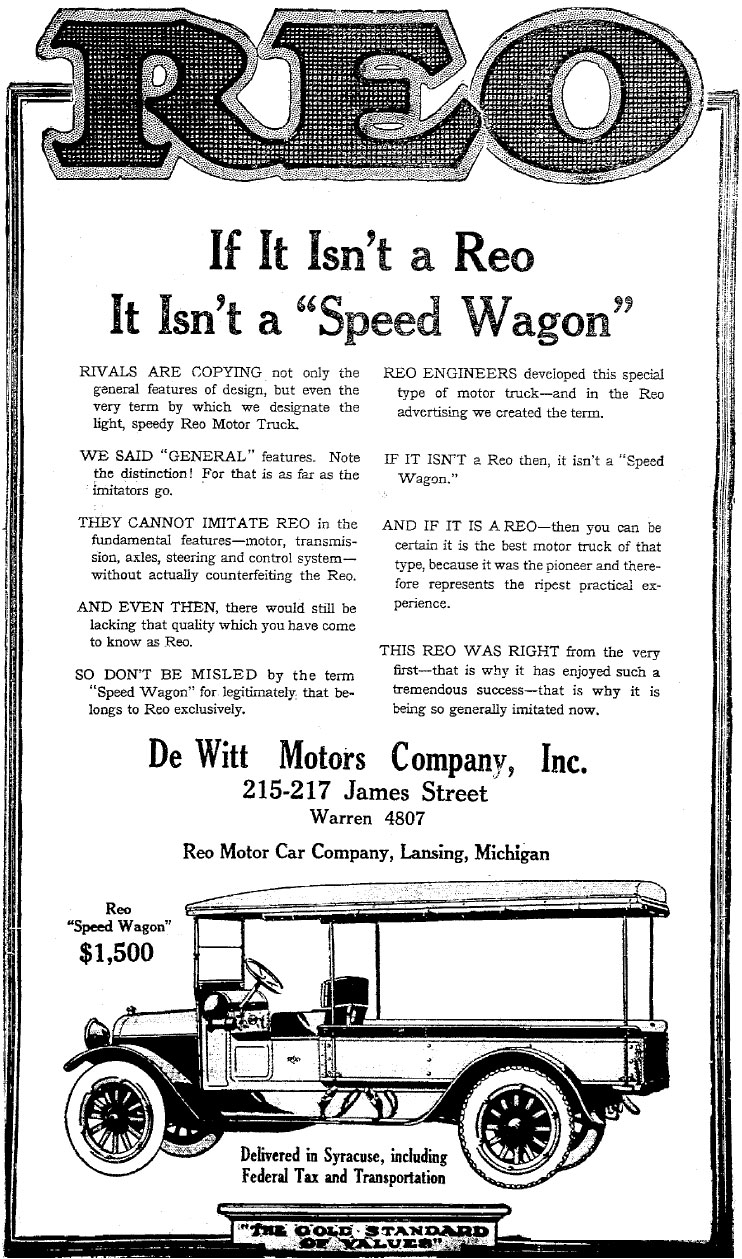
A 1919 REO Motor Car Company Advertisement. The Syracuse Herald, June 8, 1919

REO advertisement in 1953 (back cover of the October 1953 issue of Popular Mechanics)

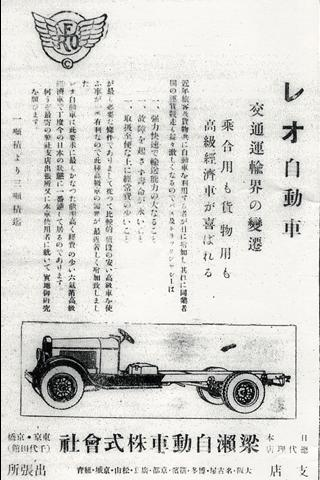
1929 REO advertisement sold at Yanase dealerships in Japan

== See also ==
- Ransom E. Olds
- Oldsmobile
- Wolverine
- List of defunct United States automobile manufacturers
