= Jack Haney =

Fonce V. "Jack" Haney (March 10, 1889 – March 26, 1935) was a Canadian auto mechanic and driver. Haney was a native of Huntington, Indiana, United States. In 1912, he was the driver and mechanic of the Reo Motor Company sedan that travelled 4,176 miles from Halifax, Nova Scotia to Vancouver, British Columbia. The journey, undertaken with journalist Thomas W. Wilby, took 52 days and was the first trans-Canada trip made by an automobile. Haney was required to make numerous repairs throughout the journey.

The trip garnered considerable press coverage in Canada, especially because the Reo special touring car had been built in St. Catharines.

Haney settled in St. Catharines after the trip. He married Annie Glendinning Swan on May 23, 1914, and opened his own garage in the city. He was also involved with the Canadian Flying Club, established in 1928.
