= Wolverine (automobile company) =

Defunct American motor vehicle manufacturer

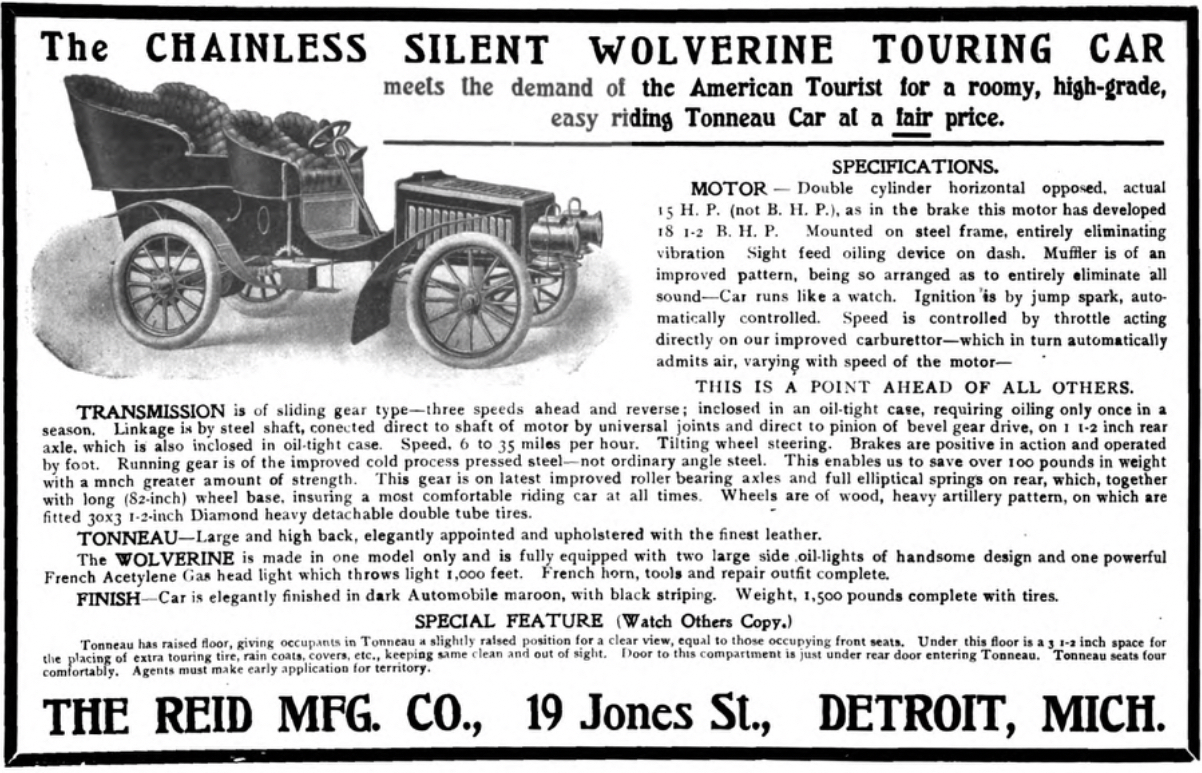
Wolverine Model C (1904-1905)

The Wolverine car was made by the Reid Manufacturing Company of Detroit, US from 1904 to 1905. The prototype was designed by Walter L. Marr. A test drive by Cycle and Automobile Journal reported that the car was good. In 1906 the company moved to Dundee, Michigan, and changed its name to Wolverine Automobile & Commercial Company of Dundee. where it closed in 1908.

This make was superseded by the Craig-Toledo.

== Models ==
Model(year)	Engine	HP	Wheelbase	Transmission
Model C (1904–1905)	4-cylinder	15	82"	3-speed
Model D(1904–1905)	2-cylinder	26	88"	3-speed
Model G(1906)	2-cylinder	10	72"	3-speed
Model F(1906)	2-cylinder	18	88"	3-speed
Model E(1906)	4-cylinder	40	88"	3-speed
