= R. E. Olds Transportation Museum =

Transportation museum in Michigan

R.E. Olds Transportation Museum
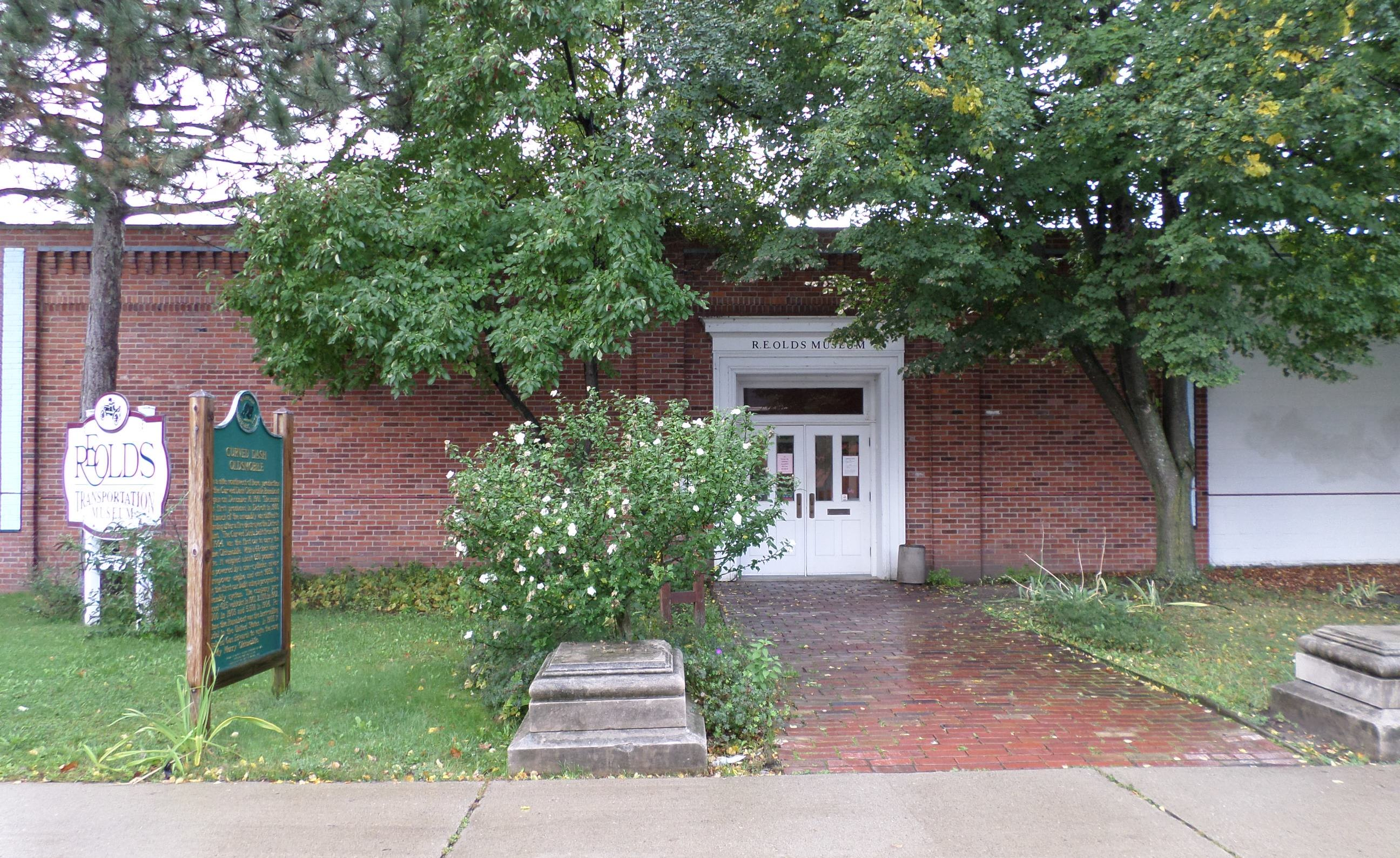

- Location within Michigan
- Established: May 1981; 45 years ago
- Location: 240 Museum Drive; Lansing, Michigan
- Coordinates: 42.73135°N 84.54807°W
- Type: Automotive
- Director: Michael Mumaugh
- Website: www.reoldsmuseum.org

The R.E. Olds Transportation Museum is named for Ransom E. Olds, founder of Oldsmobile and REO, and is located in Lansing, Michigan. It is one of the top-rated automotive museums in the United States.

== Collection ==
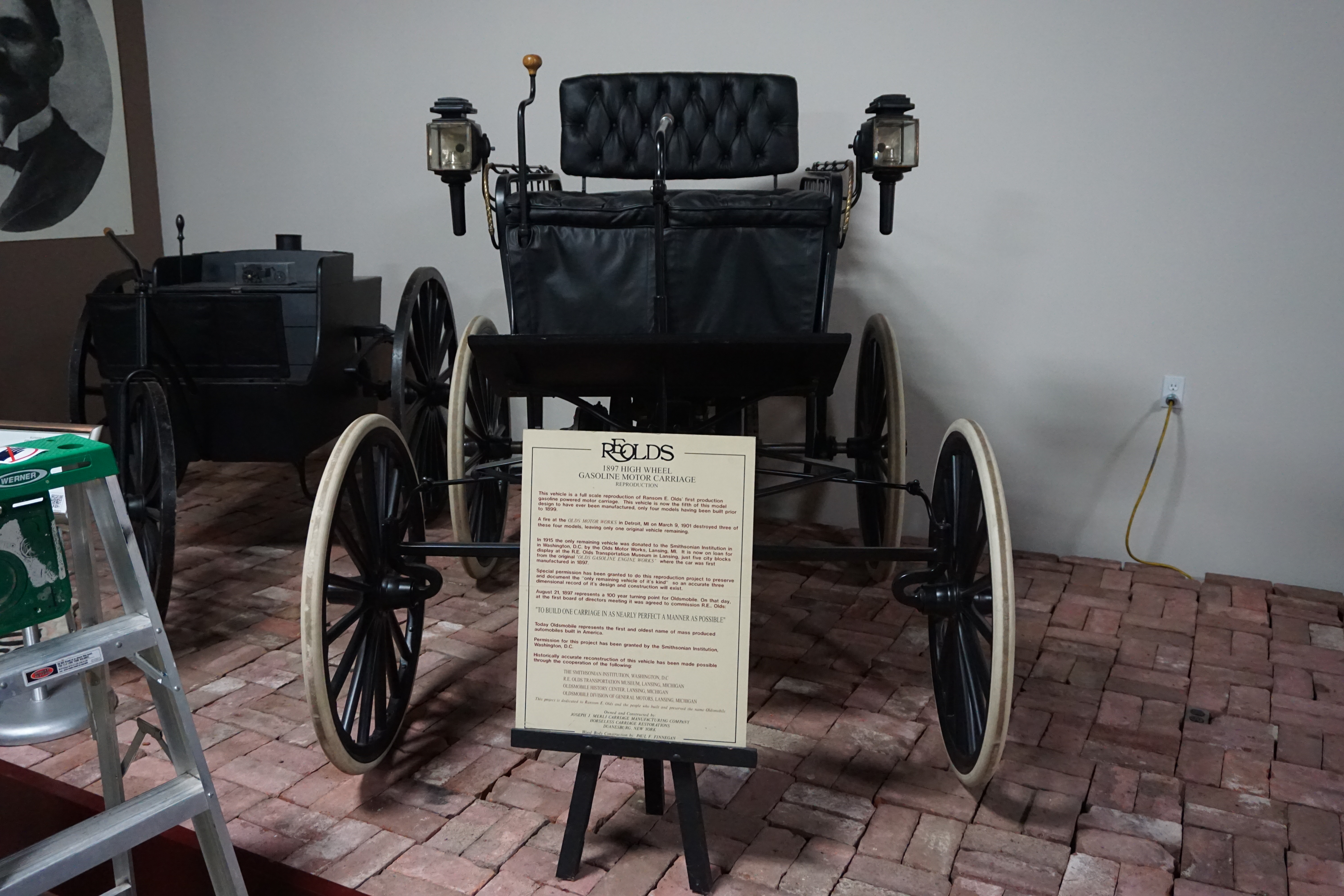
Replica of the first production gasoline vehicle built by Olds in 1897

The R. E. Olds Museum houses a diverse collection of Oldsmobiles dating from 1897 to 2004. The 1897 Olds, one of four built that year, is on loan from the Smithsonian Institution. There is also a replica of the 1893 steam carriage built by Ransom E. Olds on display, prior to the founding of the Olds Motor Works, which was the official name of Oldsmobile until the 1940s.

This museum also houses automobilia covering nearly a century, including a nearly complete collection of Michigan license plates, early traffic signs and a working 1950s-era traffic signal. A bicycle collection shows the connection between early automakers and cycle makers who had the tools, know-how and creativity to successfully produce an automobile.

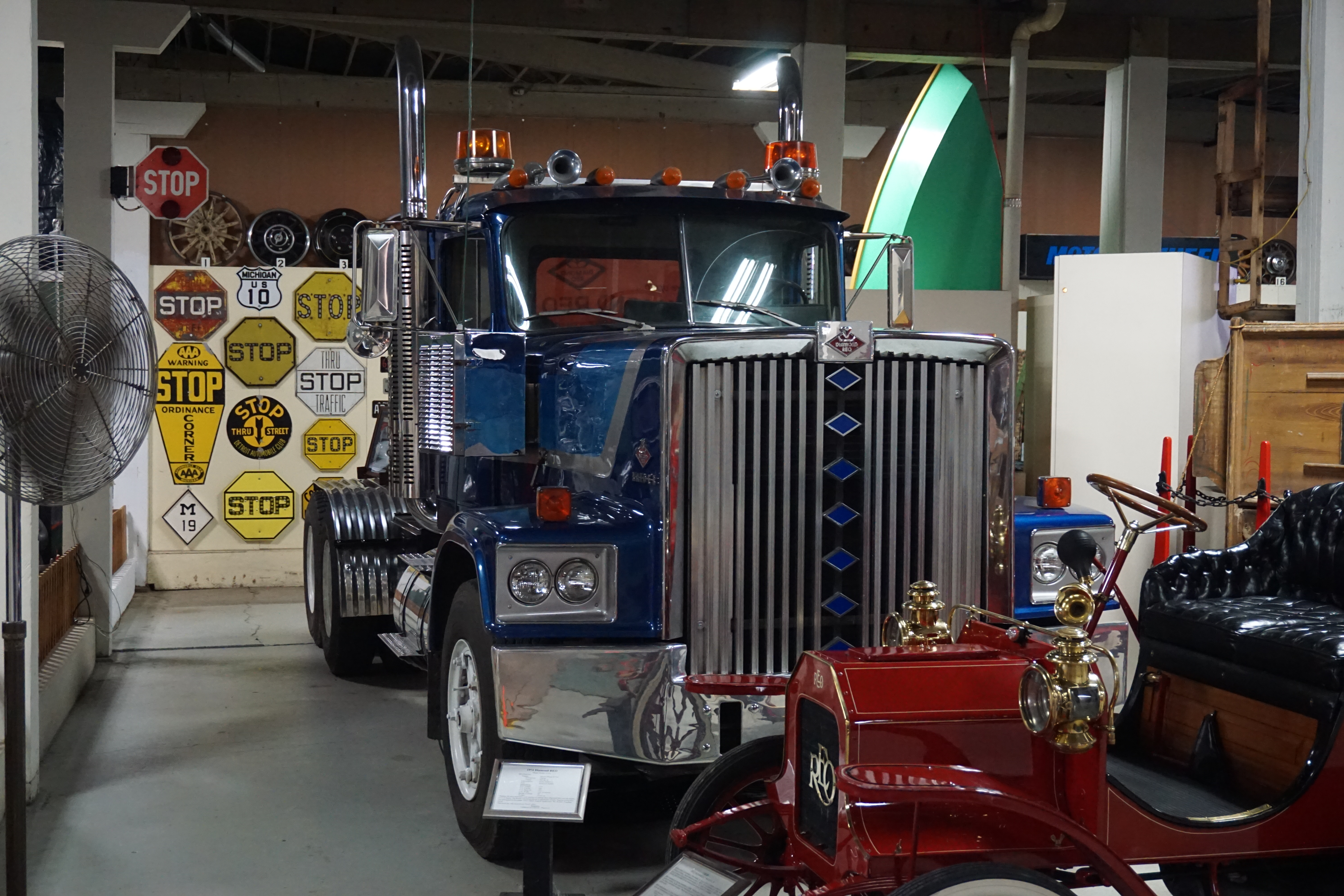
1974 Diamond Reo Raider C119

It also houses a collection of REO vehicles from the company that Ransom E. Olds created after he resigned from Oldsmobile. A well-known vehicle from that company is the REO Speed Wagon, the namesake of a major band by the same name. Another well-known truck that was made by a successor of that company is the Diamond REO.

Another significant part of this museum's collection are items from the Ransom E. Olds household.

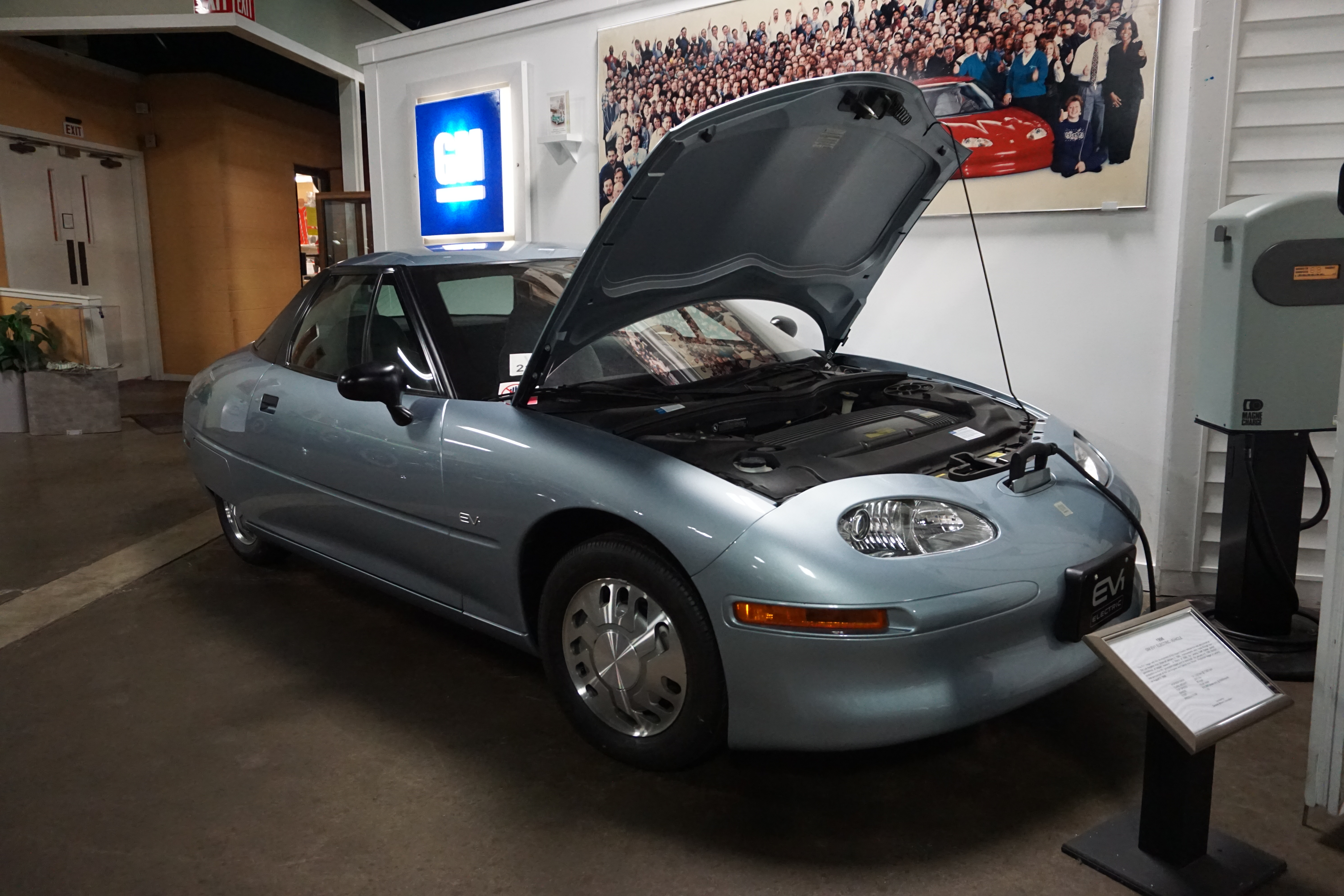
1996 GM EV1

The R. E. Olds Museum collection includes multiple electric cars, including an 1899 Olds Motor Works Electric and a 1996 General Motors EV1. The EV1 in the museum's collection is one of approximately 40 that were not destroyed when the EV1's entire production run was recalled in the early 2000s.

The last Oldsmobile built, a 2004 Alero GLS, was displayed at the museum after it rolled off the assembly line at Lansing Car Assembly. The "Final 500 Collector's Edition" (#500 of 500) Alero sedan in Dark Cherry Metallic paint was on display at the museum until 2009, when it was moved to the GM Heritage Center in Sterling Heights. The final Oldsmobile was sold to a collector in Florida in late 2017.

== History ==
Plans were in the making for an automotive museum in Lansing as early as 1977. The R. E. Olds Museum opened in May 1981, following years of planning and preview events. Highlights of the initial collection included a 1911 Oldsmobile Limited from the Oldsmobile factory collection, and the first Oldsmobile Toronado produced.

The museum's building holds a place in Lansing's automotive history, as the home of the Bates automobile. The building was subsequently used as a beer warehouse, and was the original bus garage for CATA at its inception in 1972. Converting the building to a museum required substantial work, performed mostly by volunteers.

The city leased the building to the museum for $2 per year until 2018, when the museum purchased the building for $2.

The Olds Museum was featured on American Pickers in 2011. The museum was the buyer of a 1908-vintage license plate used by the Oldsmobile factory on its test cars.

== See also ==
- List of automobile museums
- List of transport museums
