= REO Speed Wagon =

Light motor truck

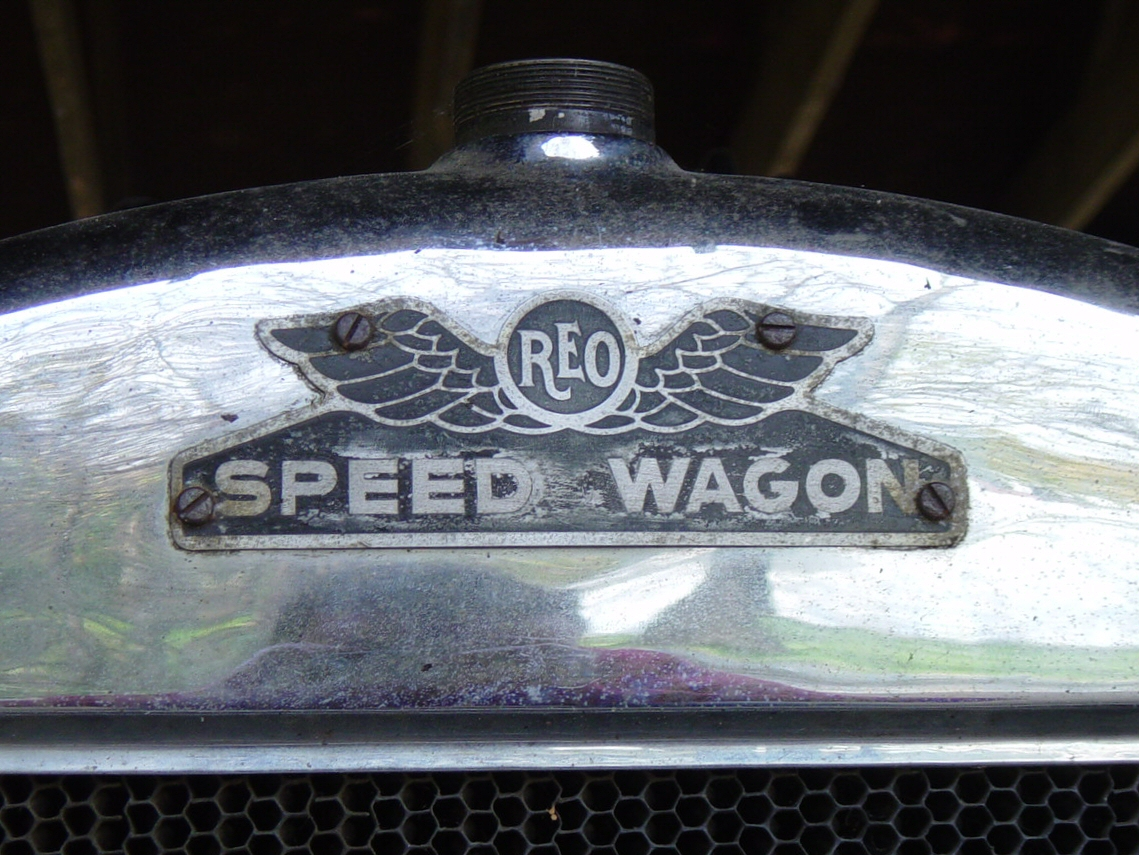
Badge from a REO Speed Wagon Fire Truck

The REO Speed Wagon (alternatively Reo Speedwagon) was a light motor truck model manufactured by REO Motor Car Company. It is an ancestor of the pickup truck.

First introduced in 1915, production continued through at least 1953, and made REO (the initials of its founder, Ransom Eli Olds) one of the better-known manufacturers of commercial vehicles in America prior to World War II. Although the basic design and styling of the chassis remained consistent, the Speed Wagon was manufactured in a variety of configurations (pickup and panel truck, passenger bus) to serve as delivery, tow, dump, and fire trucks, as well as hearses and ambulances. Other manufacturers provided refits for adapting the Speed Wagon for specialized purposes. The Speed Wagon used REO's "Gold Crown" series of engines, and was well regarded for power, durability, and quality.

While REO produced some wagons based on its automobile chassis (the Model H) starting in 1908 and had organized a division to produce trucks in 1910 with success, the Speed Wagon's introduction in 1915 was a significant step and a sales success. The company was soon offering a variety of Speed Wagon models with many options, and by 1925 had produced 125,000.

After years of roughly equal car and truck emphasis, REO shifted its focus completely to trucks, ending automobile production in 1936. Production for the civilian market was suspended during World War II, resuming in 1946. In 1967, Diamond T and Reo Trucks were combined to form the Diamond Reo Trucks Division of the White Motor Corporation.

The rock and roll quintet REO Speedwagon took its name from this vehicle. The name was later used for a main character in JoJo's Bizarre Adventure.

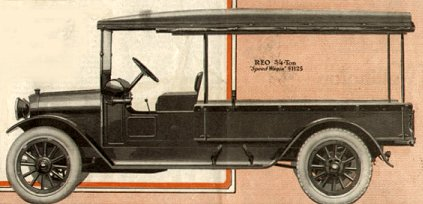
A REO Speed Wagon, from a 1917 advertisement

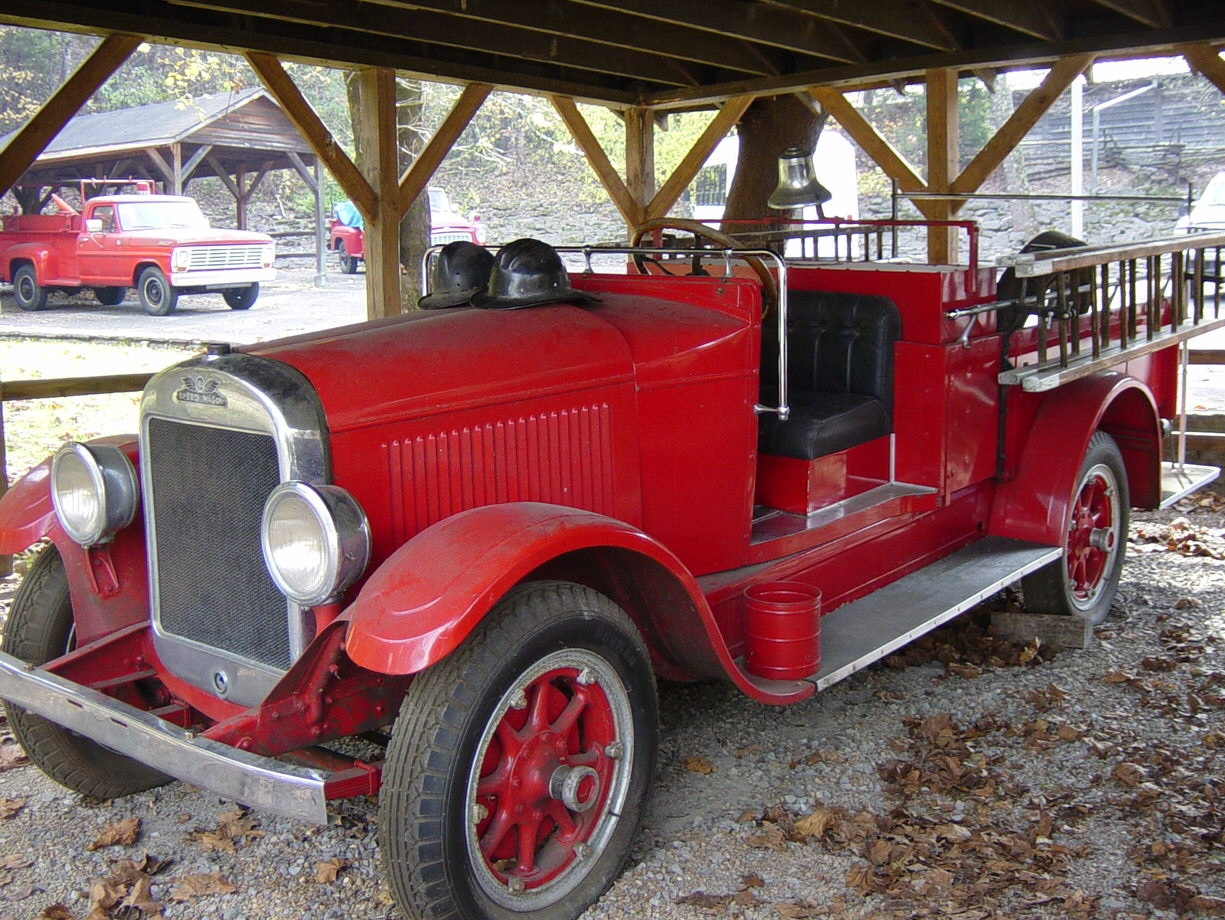
A REO Speed Wagon Fire Truck at Jack Daniels Distillery, Lynchburg, Tennessee

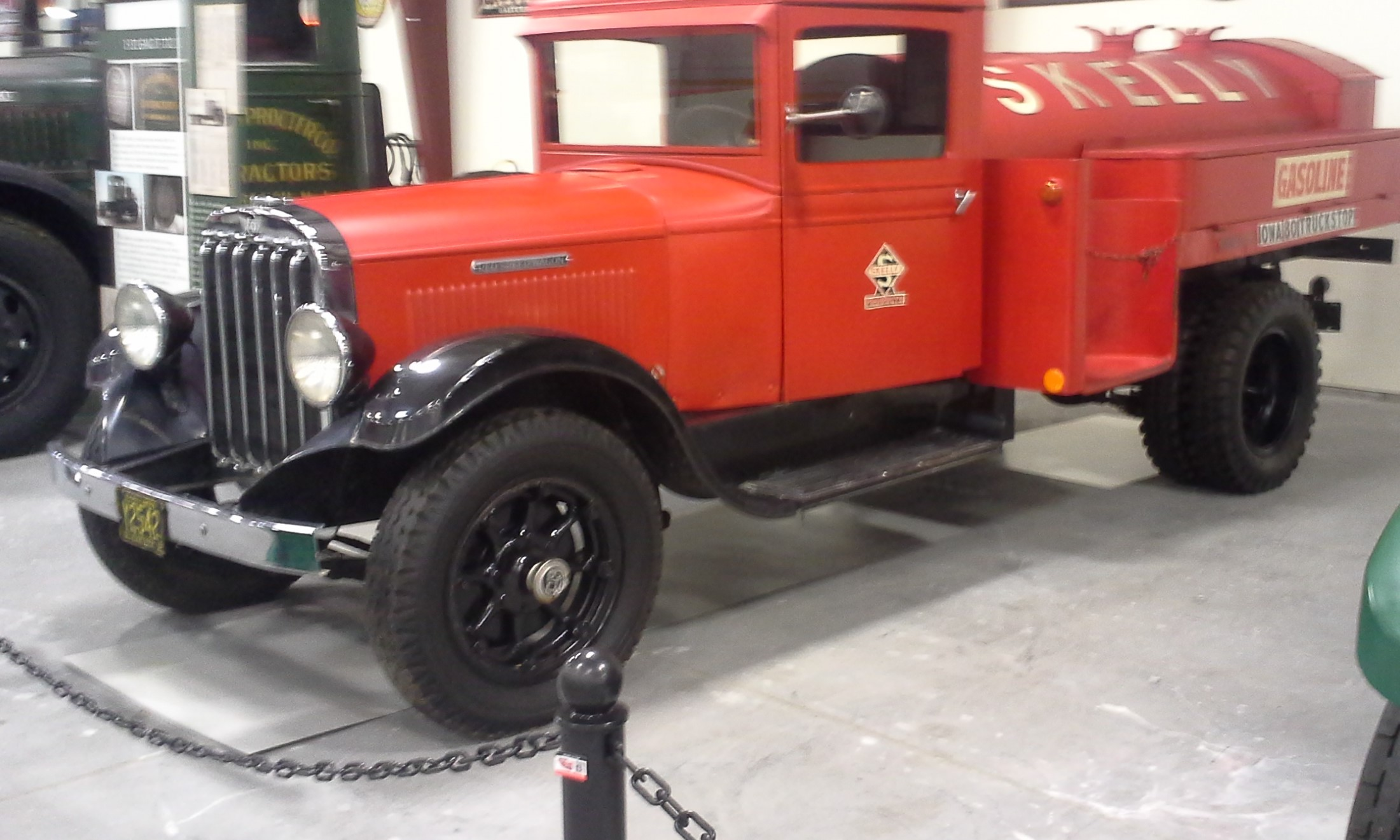
1929 REO Speedwagon EX REO at the Iowa 80 Trucking Museum. Six cylinder flathead "Gold Comet", four-speed transmission, top speed of 35 MPH

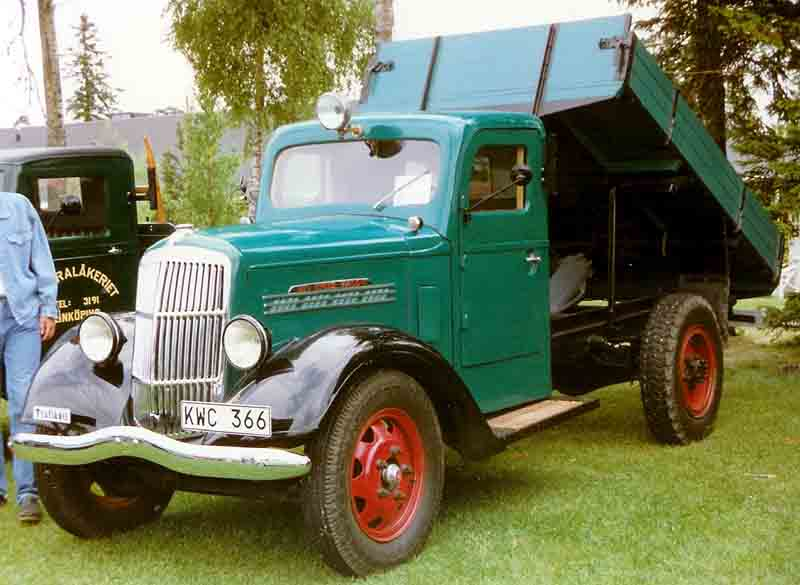
REO Speed Wagon Truck 1939

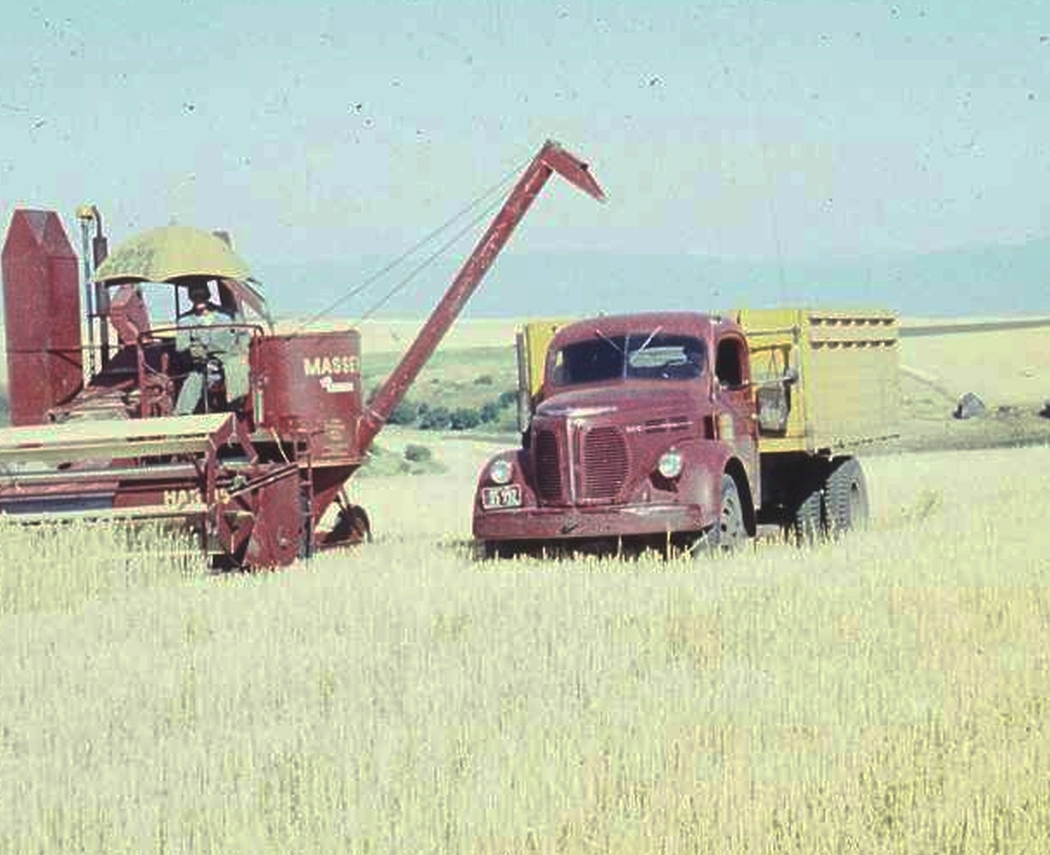
1948 2 1/2-ton REO Speed Wagon truck used to haul grain on the Camas Prairie, Idaho c. 1953

== Models ==
- The 1915 model featured 1-ton weight capacity, four-cylinder engine, and three-speed transmission and aimed to be faster than the 10–15 mph (16–24 km/h) average speed of contemporary trucks.
- The 1917 model featured 3.25-ton capacity, had canvas top and sides, and cost $1125.
- The 1925 model featured a six-cylinder engine.
- The 1929 model featured REO's "Gold Crown" 268 cu in (4.4 L), 67 horsepower (50 kW), six-cylinder engine.
- The 1933 Model BN featured REO's six-cylinder "Gold Crown" engine and combination of parts from the company's Flying Cloud and Royale luxury cars. It is a rare, relatively fast panel delivery truck with a wooden body.
