= Texaco Doodlebug =

Tanker truck of the 1930s

The Texaco Doodlebug (also called the Diamond T Doodlebug) was a futuristic American tanker truck of the 1930s.

The vehicles were streamlined and highly aerodynamic. The overall shape, a flattened half-cylinder rounded at the front and tapered at the end, has been described as a "pill" or "breadloaf". The passenger cabin was blended into the body, and there were no fenders, hood, cowl, or running boards. The windshield was compound curved glass, quite advanced for the time. It stood only 6 feet (1.8 m) tall, very short for a tanker truck then or since.

The bodies were made by Heil Trailer in Fort Payne, Alabama (museum there with references and photos from the build shop that produced them) and the chassis by Diamond T. The first model was publicly displayed in January 1933. The Texaco Doodlebug probably featured a rear-mounted Hercules L-head six-cylinder engine. The clutch and gearbox were actuated by air pressure. A microphone in the engine compartment connected to a speaker in the driver's position allowed the driver to hear the engine, so he would know when to shift.

The Doodlebugs were part of an overall project by Texaco, contracted to industrial designers Norman Bel Geddes and Walter Dorwin Teague, to modernize their brand look. This project produced the Texaco star-T logo still used today and other updates, including the Doodlebug, which was designed by Bel Geddes and his design team. However, not many Doodlebugs were produced (some sources say six, but the actual number may be lost to history).
