= Diamond T 4-ton 6×6 truck =

US Army heavy tactical truck

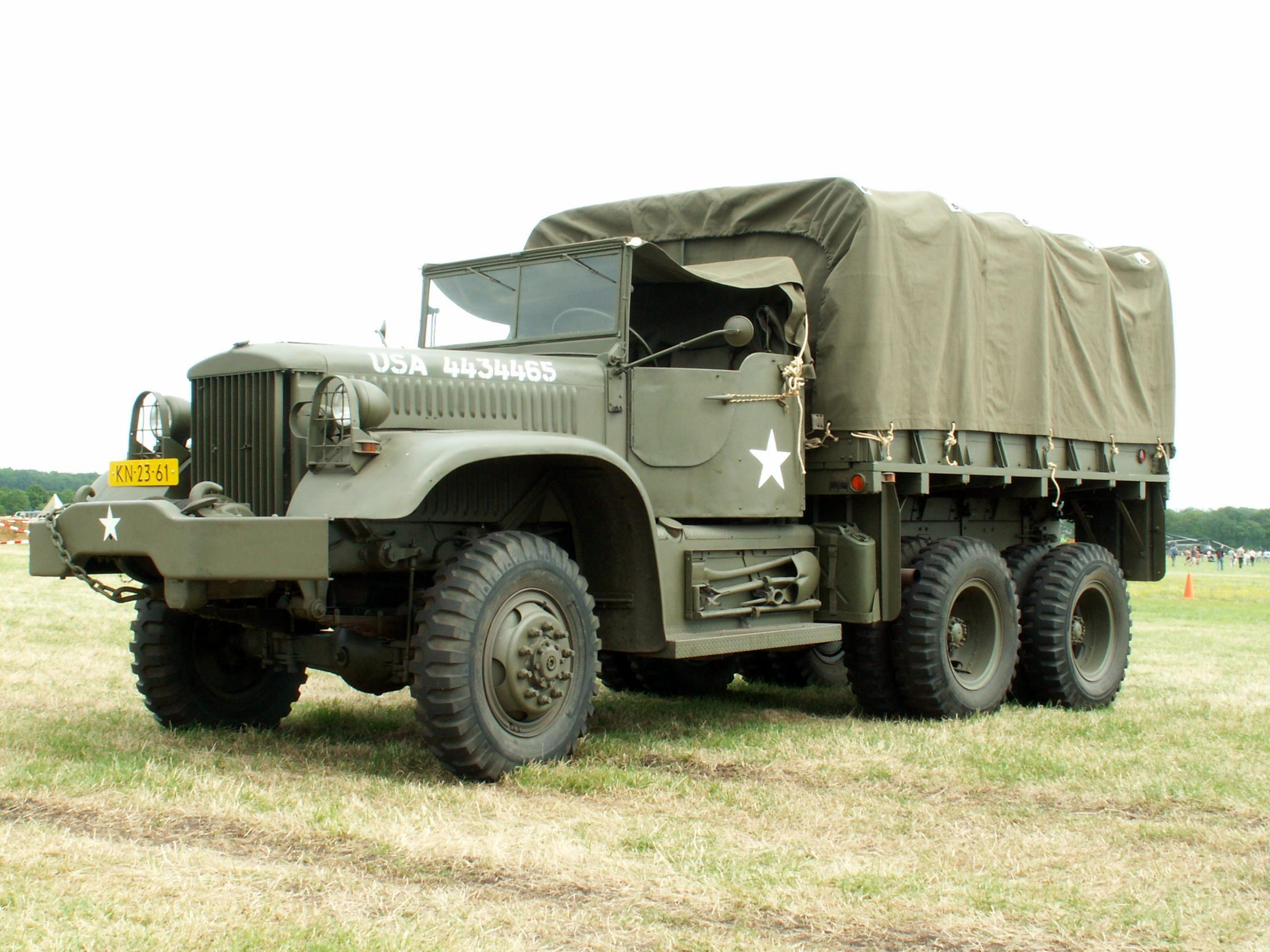
- Diamond T Model 968 cargo truck
- Type: 4-ton (3,600 kg) 6×6 truck
- Place of origin: United States

Production history
- Manufacturer: Diamond T
- Produced: 1940–1945
- No. built: 30,000+
- Variants: Dump, wrecker, and others

Specifications (Model 968A cargo)
- Mass: 18,400 lb (8,300 kg) (empty)
- Length: 24 ft 1 in (7.3 m)
- Width: 8 ft (2.4 m)
- Height: 9 ft 6 in (2.9 m)
- Engine: Hercules RXC; 131 hp (98 kW)
- Transmission: 5 speed X 2 range
- Suspension: Live beam axles on leaf springs
- Fuel capacity: 60 US gal (230 L)
- Operational range: 150–175 mi (241–282 km)
- Maximum speed: 37 mph (60 km/h)

The Diamond T 4-ton 6×6 truck was a heavy tactical truck built for the United States Army during World War II. Its G-number was G-509. Cargo models were designed to transport a 4-ton (3,600 kg) load over all terrain in all weather. There were also wrecker, dump, and other models. They were replaced by the M39 series 5-ton 6×6 trucks in the 1950s.

== History ==
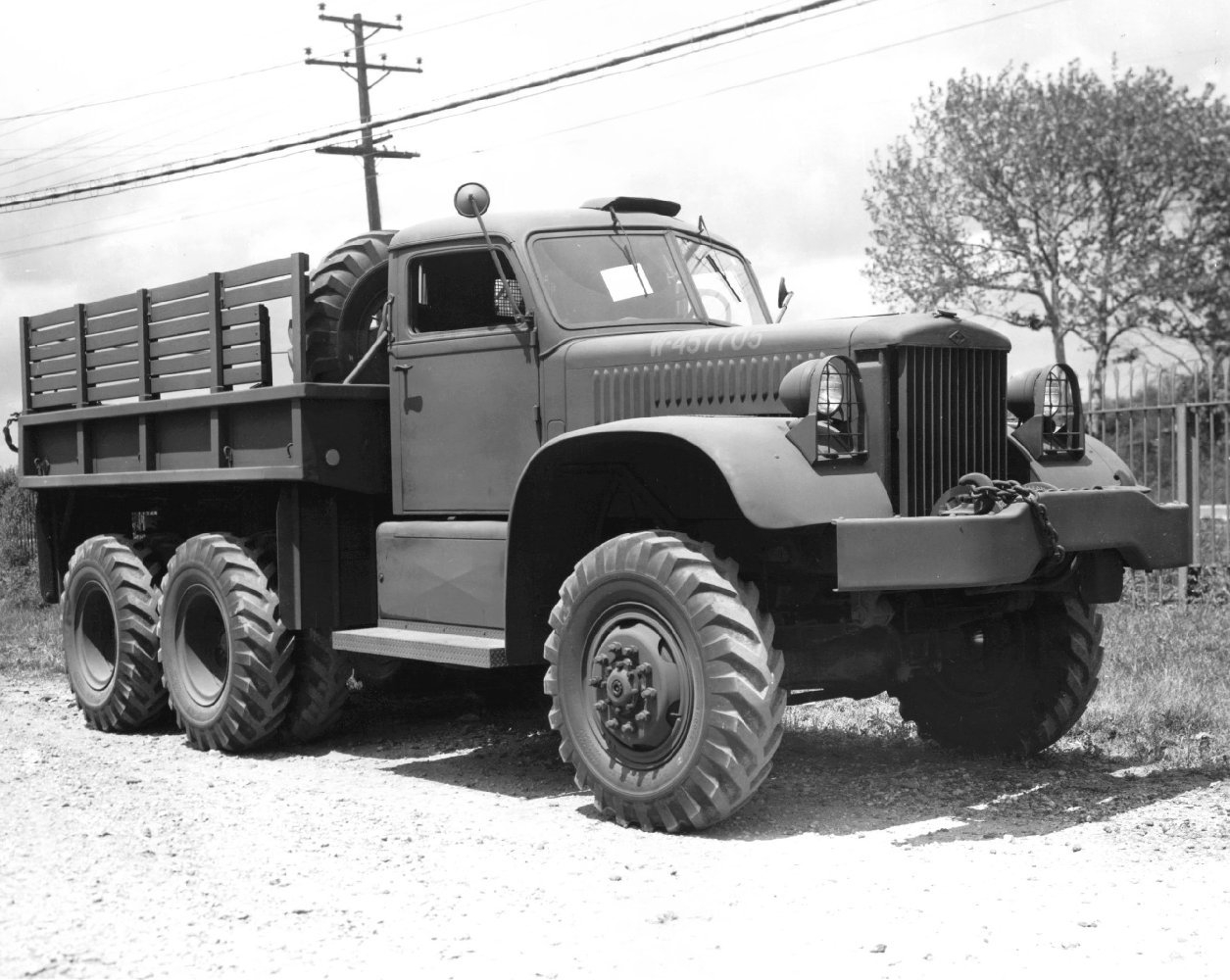
"Truck, Diamond, 4-ton, 6×6 with winch cargo"

In 1939–1941 the Army Ordnance Corps was developing a complete line of tactical trucks that could operate over all roads and cross-country terrain in all weather. 4-ton (3,600 kg) load rated six-wheel drive trucks had been successful towing artillery in the 1930s, and the size would be standardized to tow the Field Artillery Branch's new 155 mm howitzer M1.

Autocar, Diamond T, and White were building prototypes, Diamond T built 1,000 Model 967s in 1940. In 1941 their improved Model 968 was standardized and went into production at their Chicago plant. They would build over 30,000 chassis between 1940 and 1945.

The chassis was also the base for Ordnance's standard medium wrecker truck, and was used by the Corps of Engineers for cargo, dump, and specialty bodies. A crane for chemical weapons and an extra long cargo version for Canada were also built. In addition to trucks built for Canada, 2,245 were exported under the Lend-Lease Act, most to the British, French, and Canadians.

== Specifications ==
=== Engine and driveline ===
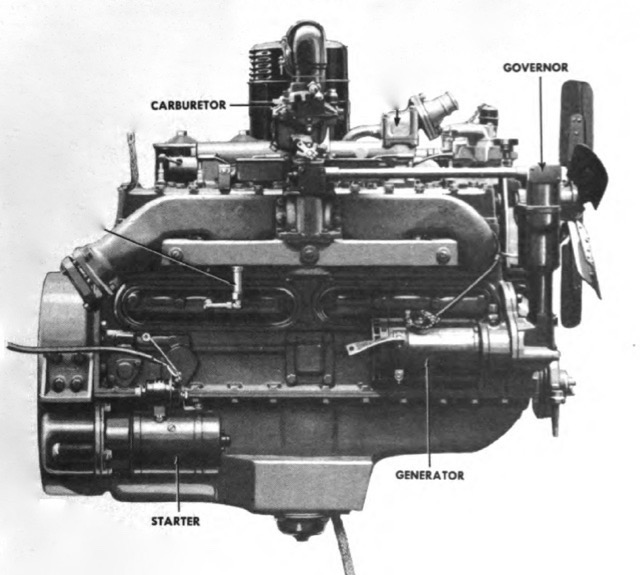
Hercules RXC engine

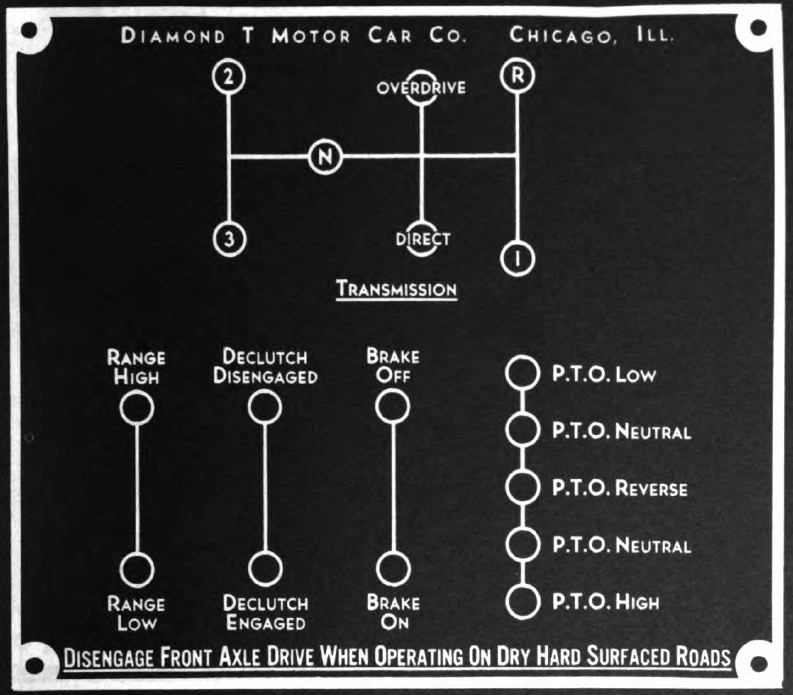
Model 968 shift pattern

All standardized models used Hercules RXC engines, a 529 cu in (8.7 L) L-head inline 6 cylinder gasoline engine developing 131 horsepower (98 kW) at 2100 rpm and 396 pound force-feet (537 N⋅m) of torque at 1000 rpm.

A 5-speed manual transmission with a very low 1st and an overdrive 5th gear was used. A transfer case had a high and low range, a neutral for power take-off operation, and engaged the front axle. Axles were Timken double reduction “pumpkin” type.

Most trucks had a front-mounted 15,000 pounds (6,800 kg) Gar Wood winch with 300 feet (91 m) of cable. The exception was dumps built before June 1944. The winch was driven off the transmission with it in neutral and was operated from inside the cab. Dump and wrecker bodies were driven off the transfer case with the transmission in gear.

=== Chassis ===
All models had a ladder frame with three live axles, the front on leaf springs, the rear tandem axles on leaf springs with locating arms.

There were two wheelbases. The standard 151 inches (3.8 m) and the long 172 inches (4.4 m) used by the pontoon cargo truck. (measurements are from the centerline of the front axle to the centerline of the rear tandem).

Tires were 9.00×20 with dual rear tires. Brakes were full air with drum brakes on all wheels. Trailer air connections applied trailer-brakes with the truck brakes and a hand lever could apply the trailer brakes alone.

Early models had commercial type cabs, in June 1944 open military type cabs were introduced. These were easier to use in combat and also reduced shipping height, very important at the time. Both cab types could be equipped with a ring for a .50 cal. machine gun and every fourth truck was equipped with one.

== Models ==
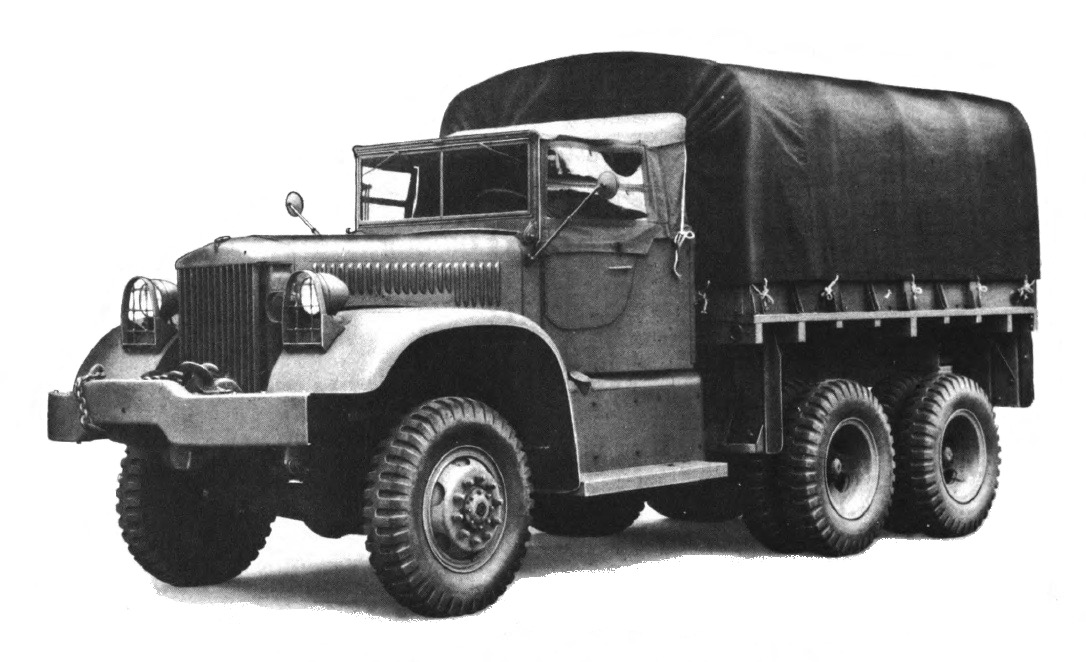
Model 968A cargo

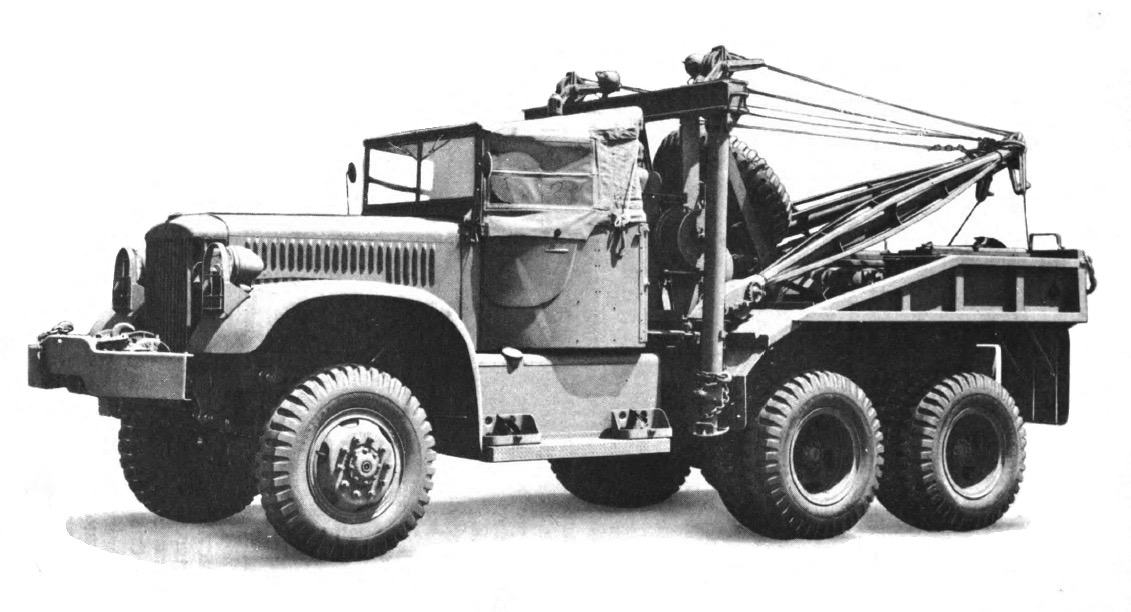
Model 969A wrecker

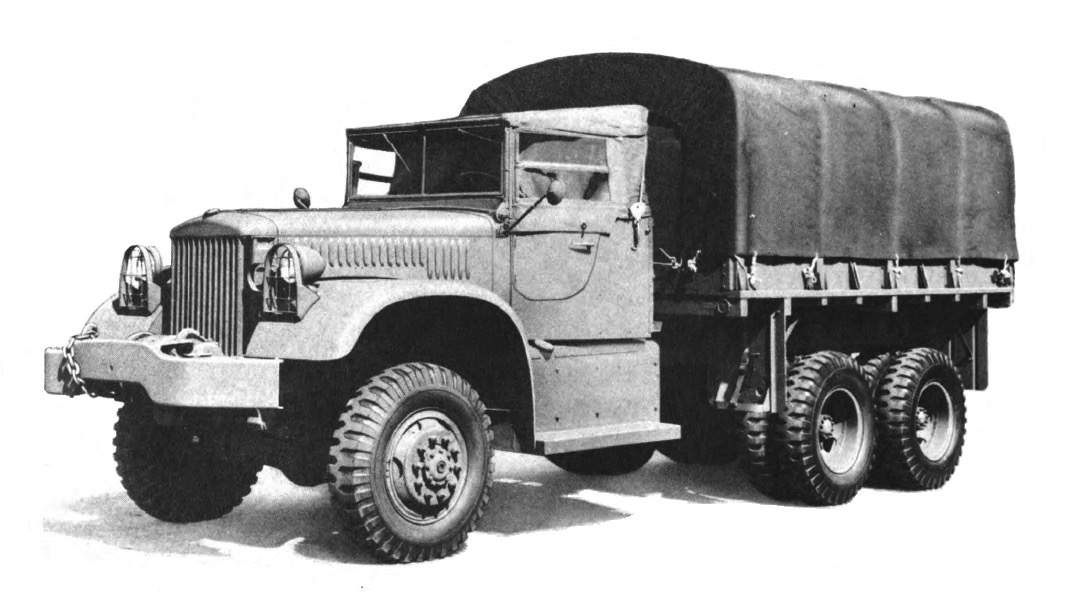
Model 970A ponton

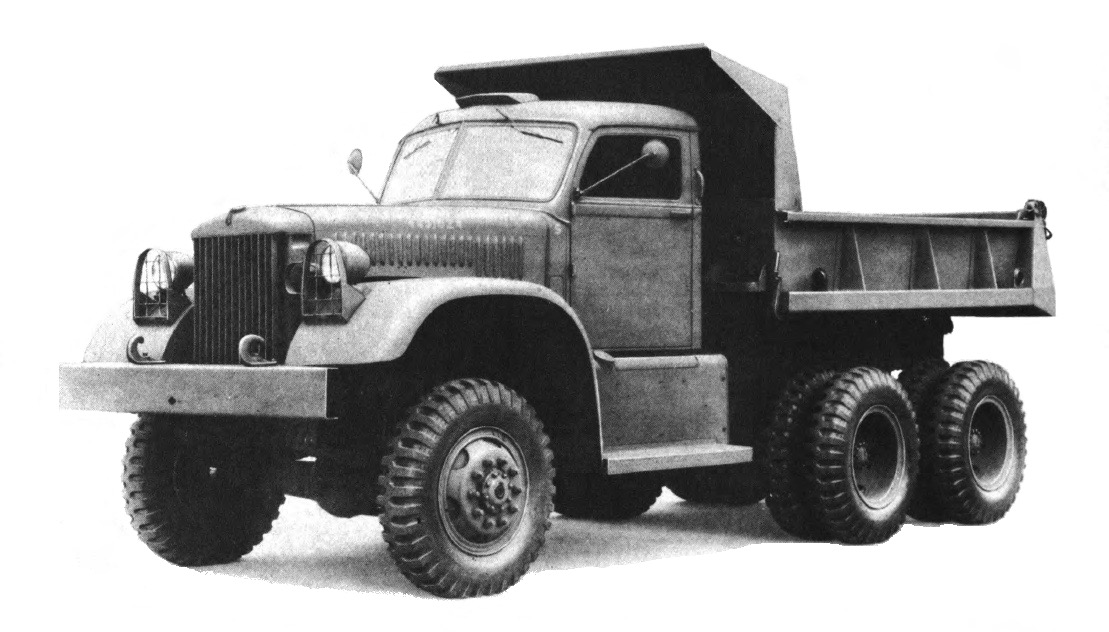
Model 972A dump

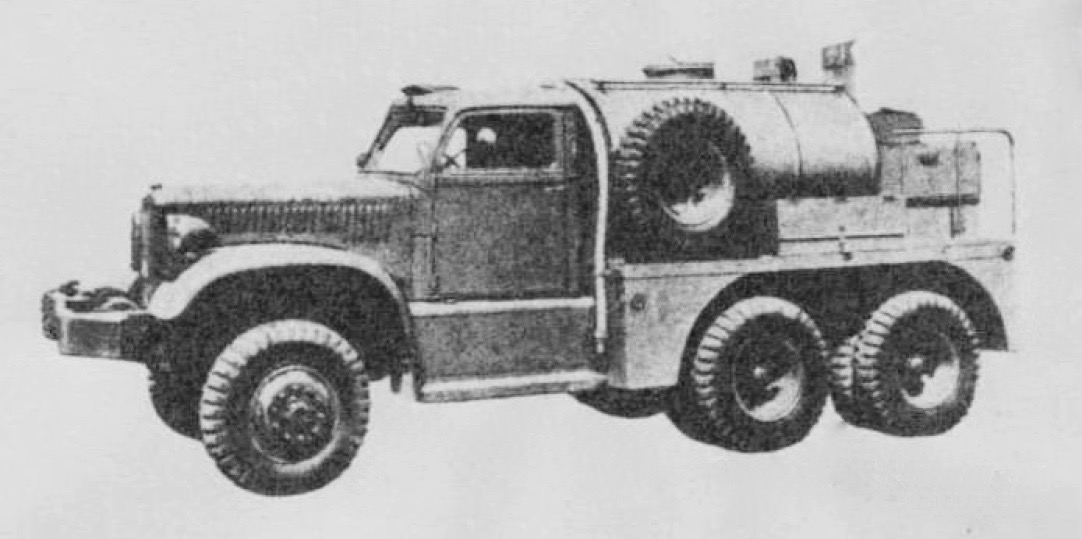
Asphalt distributor

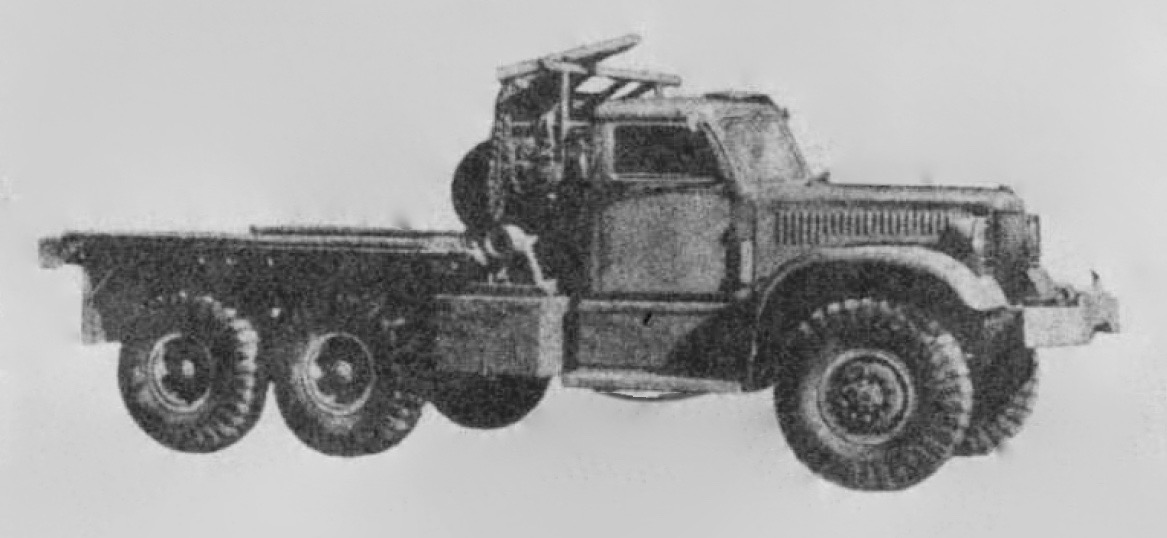
Flatbed

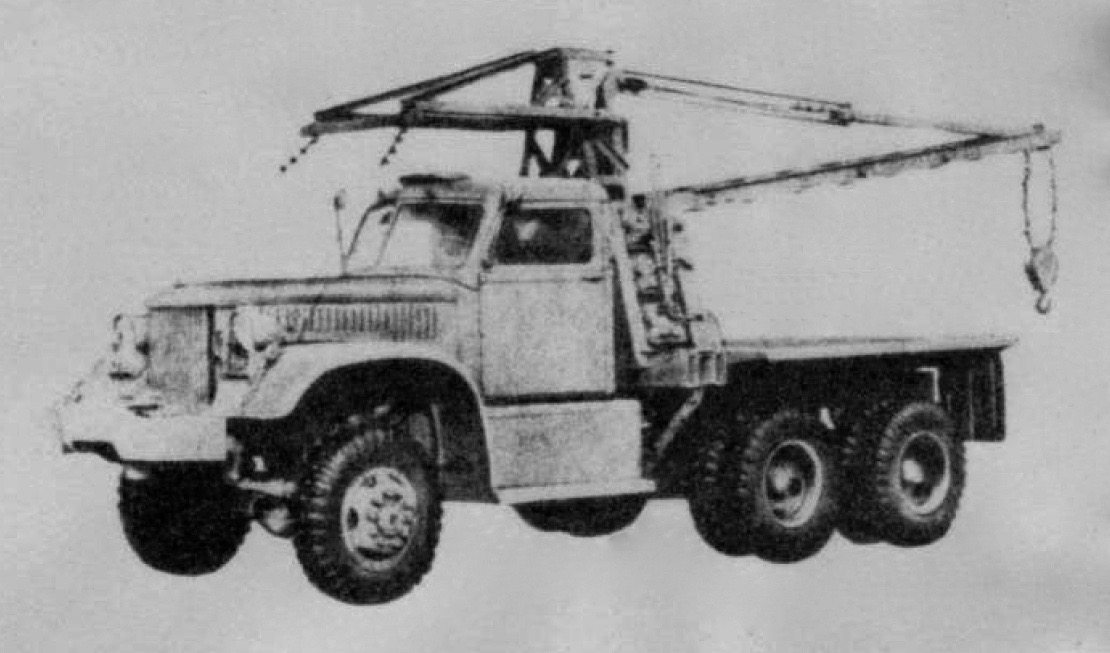
Chemical warfare crane

=== Cargo Model 968 ===
The basic cargo model was a prime mover used to tow the 155 mm howitzer M1 and transport the gun crew, equipment, and ammunition. They had a pintle hitch at the rear to tow up to 11,000 pounds (5,000 kg) off-road and 25,000 pounds (11,000 kg) on road. With a short wheelbase and rear overhang, the body could only be 11 feet (3.4 m) feet long. It had sideboards with fold down troop seats and bows for an overhead tarpaulin. Two spare tires were mounted inside the body, across the front. Early models had all steel bodies, in 1942 they were replaced by largely wood types to conserve steel.

=== Wrecker Model 969 ===
The wrecker had a Holmes twin-boom design with a swinging boom and powered hoist cable on each side. When towing the booms were rotated to the rear, connected at the ends, and worked as one A-frame. When lifting the booms could be separated and rotated 90% forward to the side, an outrigger could be lowered to increase lifting capacity. A power take-off on the transfer case drove a transmission with two winches in the wrecker frame. Controls on both sides of the body allowed each winch to raise or lower independently of the other. The body had low sides on the rear half which tapered to the floor in the front, making clearance for the boom to swing. A brace for the wrecker frame held a spare tire. Welding tanks, an air compressor, cables, block and tackle, chains, tow-bars, and other equipment were carried.

=== Ponton Model 970 ===
The prime mover had limited cargo room, and the Engineers wanted a model with a larger body to carry bridge pontoons. The spare tire was moved behind the cab and a 12-foot (3.66 m) bed was placed further back on the chassis. The wheelbase was increased as the rear tandem was moved back to improve weight distribution. It could tow 11,000 pounds (5,000 kg) off-road and 25,000 pounds (11,000 kg) on-road like the prime mover, but had a wider turning radius.

=== Dump Model 972 ===
The dump had a 12 feet (3.7 m) long 4 cubic yards (3 m^{3}) steel body that was raised and lowered by a hydraulic cylinder and lever arrangement under the body. A power take-off on the transfer case, used with the transmission in gear, drove the hydraulic pump, the controls were inside the cab. The body had a tailgate that hinged from either the top or bottom. When the tailgate was hinged at the top the bottom could be opened while dumping with a lever on the left front corner of the body, just behind the driver's window. The front of the body had a stone-shield that covered the cab and the spare tire mounted between the cab and body.

=== Cargo Model 975 ===
The Canadian Army bought 1,500 extra-long chassis with a 201" wheelbase. Cargo, bridge, and "workshop" van bodies were mounted.

=== Specialty bodies ===
In addition to the ponton and dump trucks the Engineers used over 2,000 chassis for specialty bodies. Two similar engineer bodies were mounted on short wheelbase chassis. Distributors are tank trucks with nozzles on the rear to spread the liquid in an even pattern when the truck drives forward. A water distributor carried 1,000 US gallons (3,800 L), an asphalt distributor carried 800 US gallons (3,000 L) and had a heater to keep the asphalt warm.

Two engineer bodies were mounted on long wheelbase chassis. A flatbed with a cab protector and mid-ship mounted winch was used for self-loading and carrying large equipment. A 13 feet (4.0 m) van body was used for map-making and printing sections.

The Chemical Warfare Service used a short wheelbase chassis for a standard swinging boom body used to lift and move chemical containers.

== Gallery ==
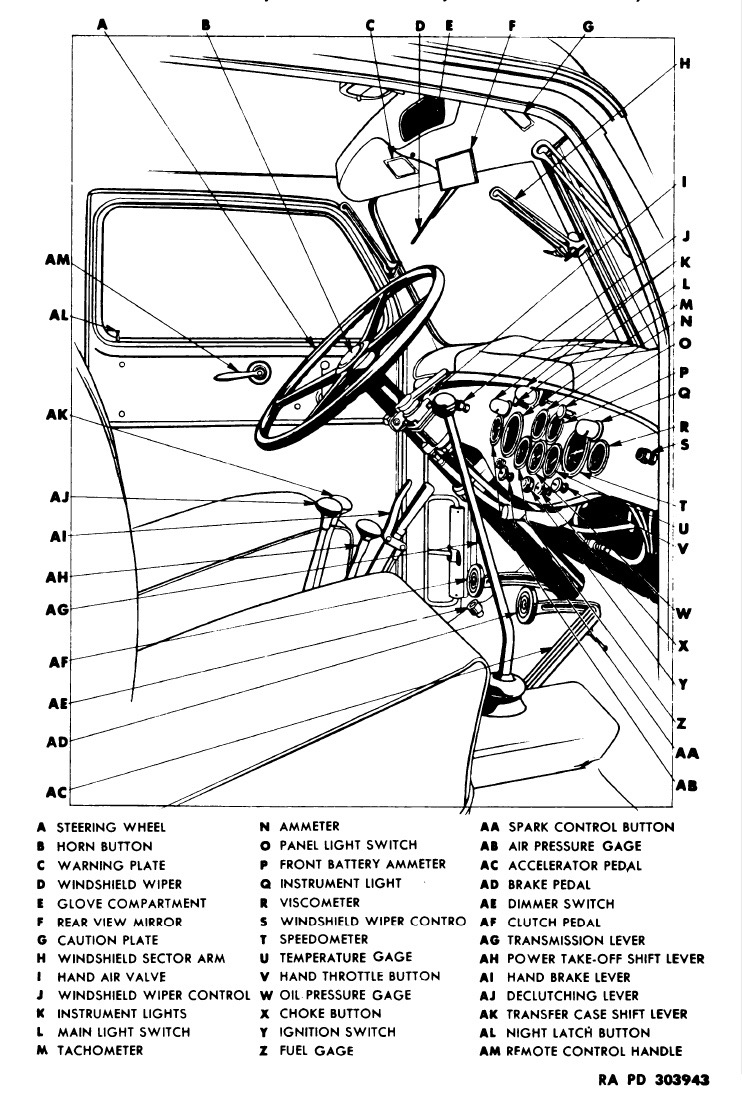
Interior of closed cab

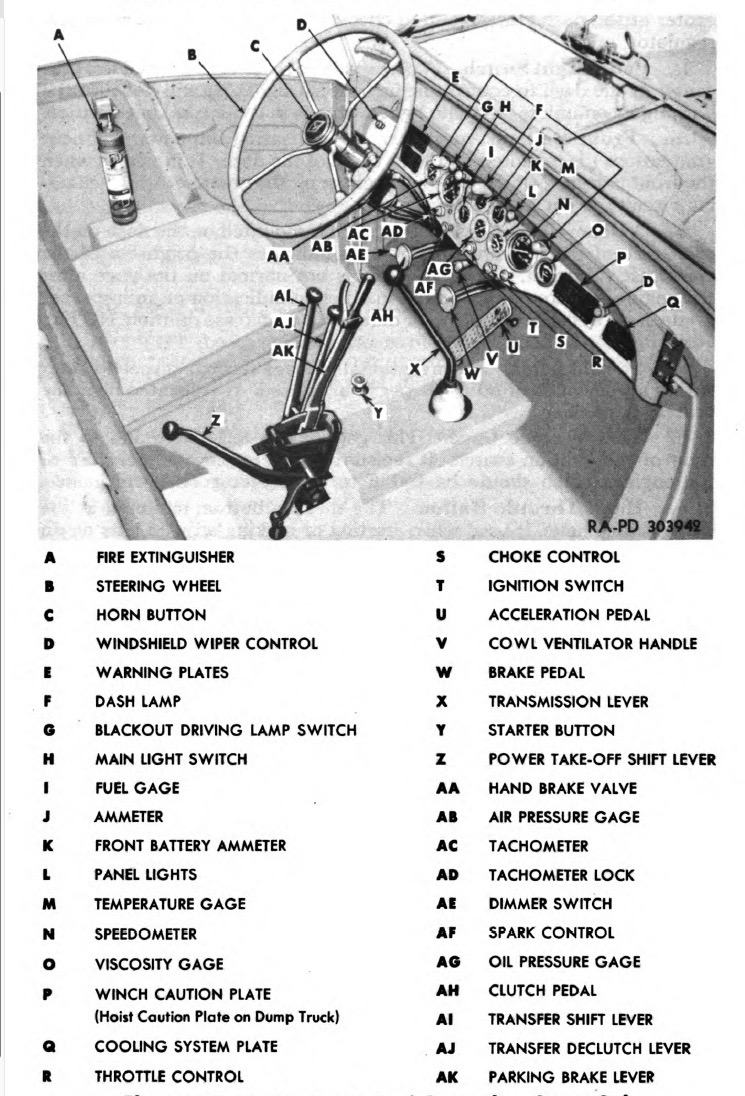
Interior of open cab

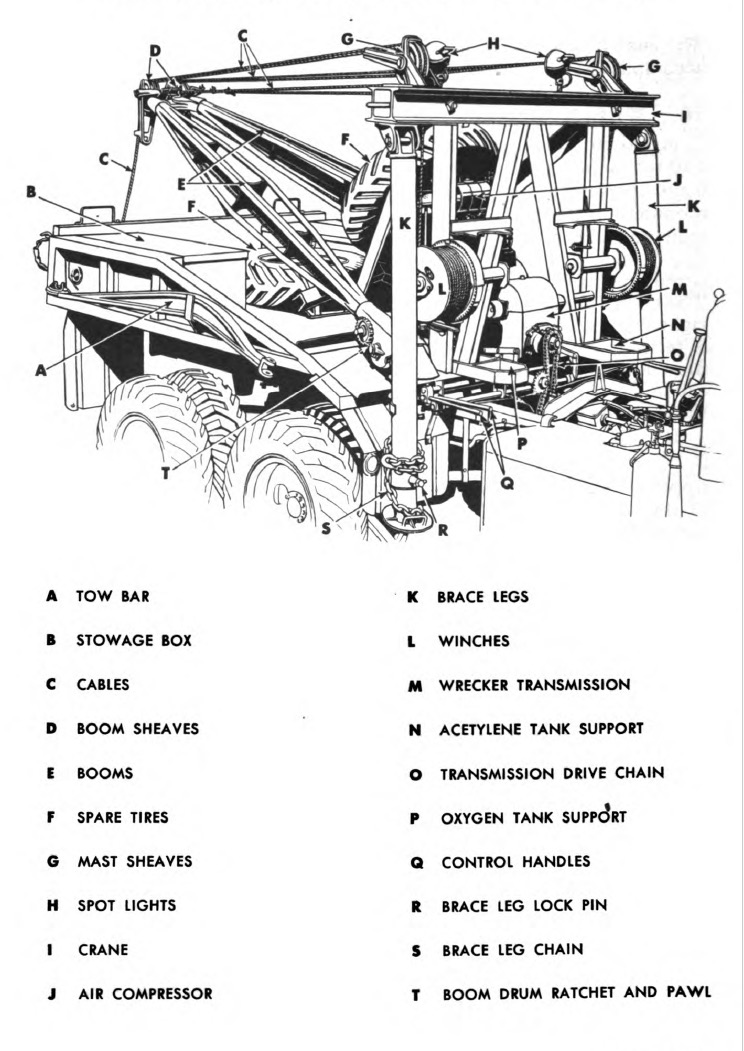
Wrecker boom
(right front without cab)

== See also ==
- M19 tank transporter
