= Diamond T =

Defunct American motor vehicle manufacturer

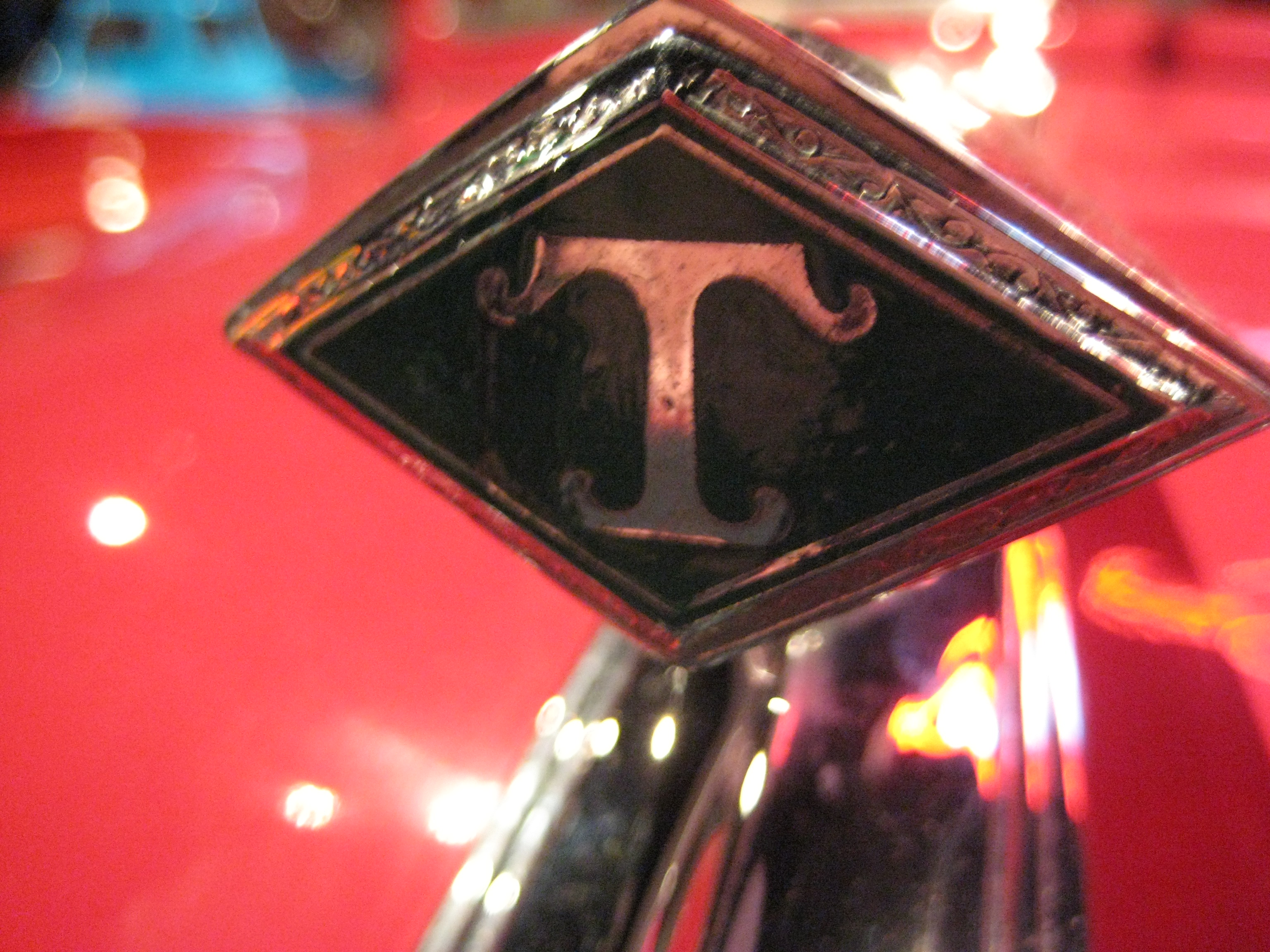
- Industry: Automotive
- Founded: 1905; 121 years ago
- Founder: C. A. Tilt
- Defunct: 1967; 59 years ago
- Fate: Merged
- Successor: Diamond Reo Trucks
- Headquarters: Chicago, Illinois
- Products: Automobiles, trucks

The Diamond T Company was an American automobile and truck manufacturer. They produced commercial and military trucks.

== History ==
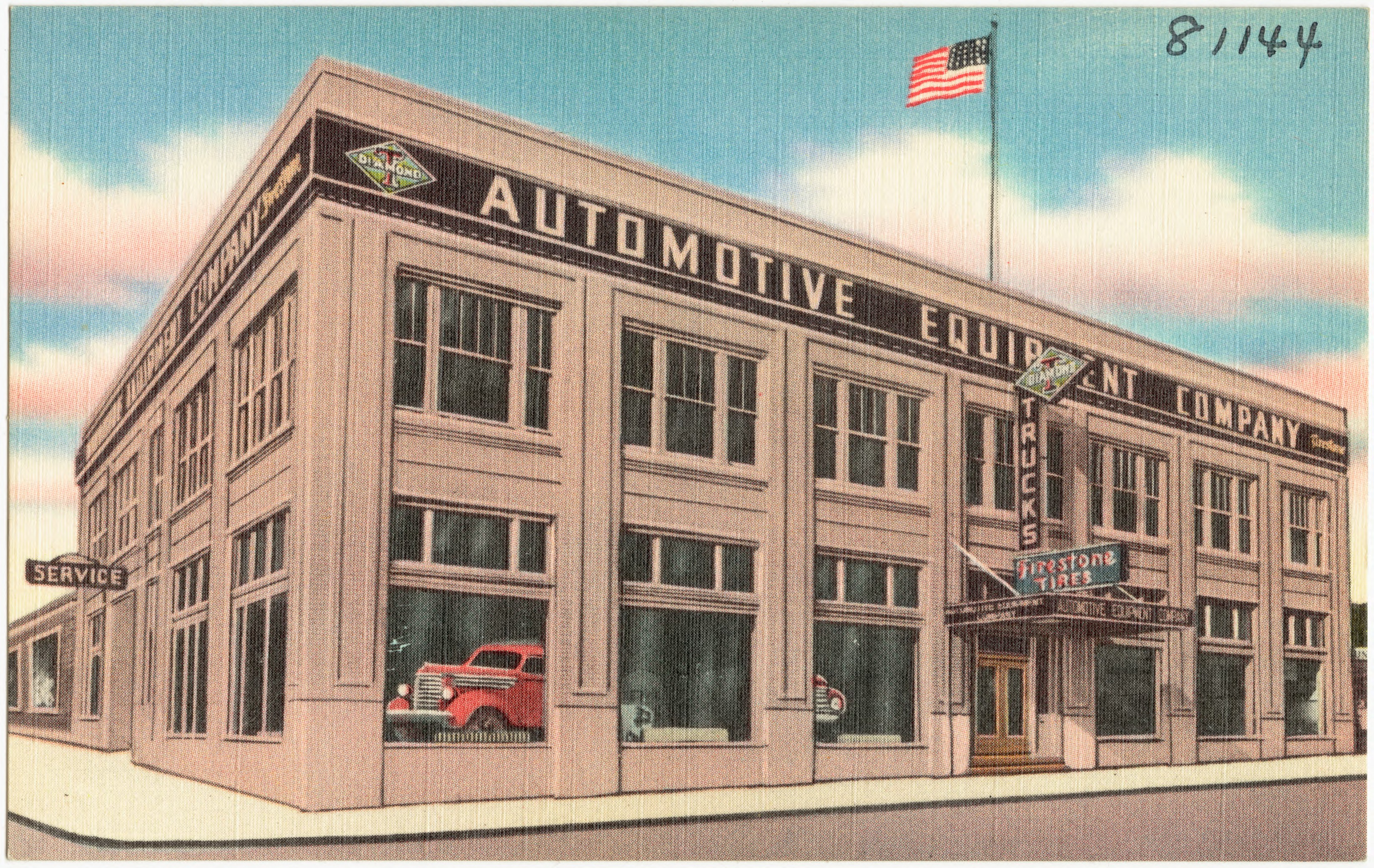
1940s Diamond T dealership in Oregon.

The Diamond T Motor Car Company was founded in Chicago in 1905 by C. A. Tilt. Reportedly, the company name was created when Tilt’s shoe-making father fashioned a logo featuring a big “T” (for Tilt) framed by a diamond, which signified high quality. The company's hood emblem on trucks was a sled dog in harness. From its beginnings manufacturing touring cars, the company later became known for its trucks. By 1967, as a subsidiary of White Motor Corporation, it was merged with Reo Motor Company to become Diamond Reo Trucks, Inc.

During World War II, Diamond T produced a prototype of a heavy truck in the 980/981, a prime mover which was adapted and quickly acquired by the British Purchasing Commission for duty as a tank transporter tractor. Coupled with a Rogers trailer, the truck gave sterling service with the British Army in North Africa Campaign, where its power and rugged construction allowed the rescue of damaged tanks in the most demanding of conditions. In addition Diamond T built the entire range of the G509 series 4 ton 6X6s, including cargo, dump, semi tractor, and wrecker trucks, as well as some lighter trucks, and even G7102 half tracks. Diamond T ranked 47th among United States corporations in the value of World War II military production contracts. Diamond T manufactured three pickup trucks: The Model 80,201 and the Model 202. The pickups were powered by the Hercules QX-series 6-cylinder engines. The model 80 was produced from 1936 to 1938 and the Model 201 was produced from 1938 to 1949.

Diamond T advertisement (1918)

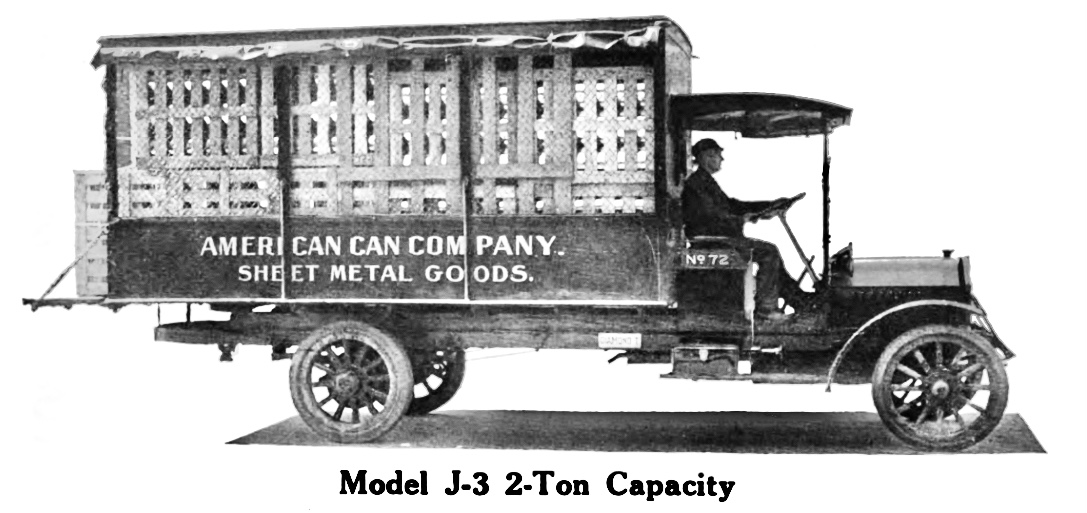
Diamond T Model J3 (1915-1920) 2t

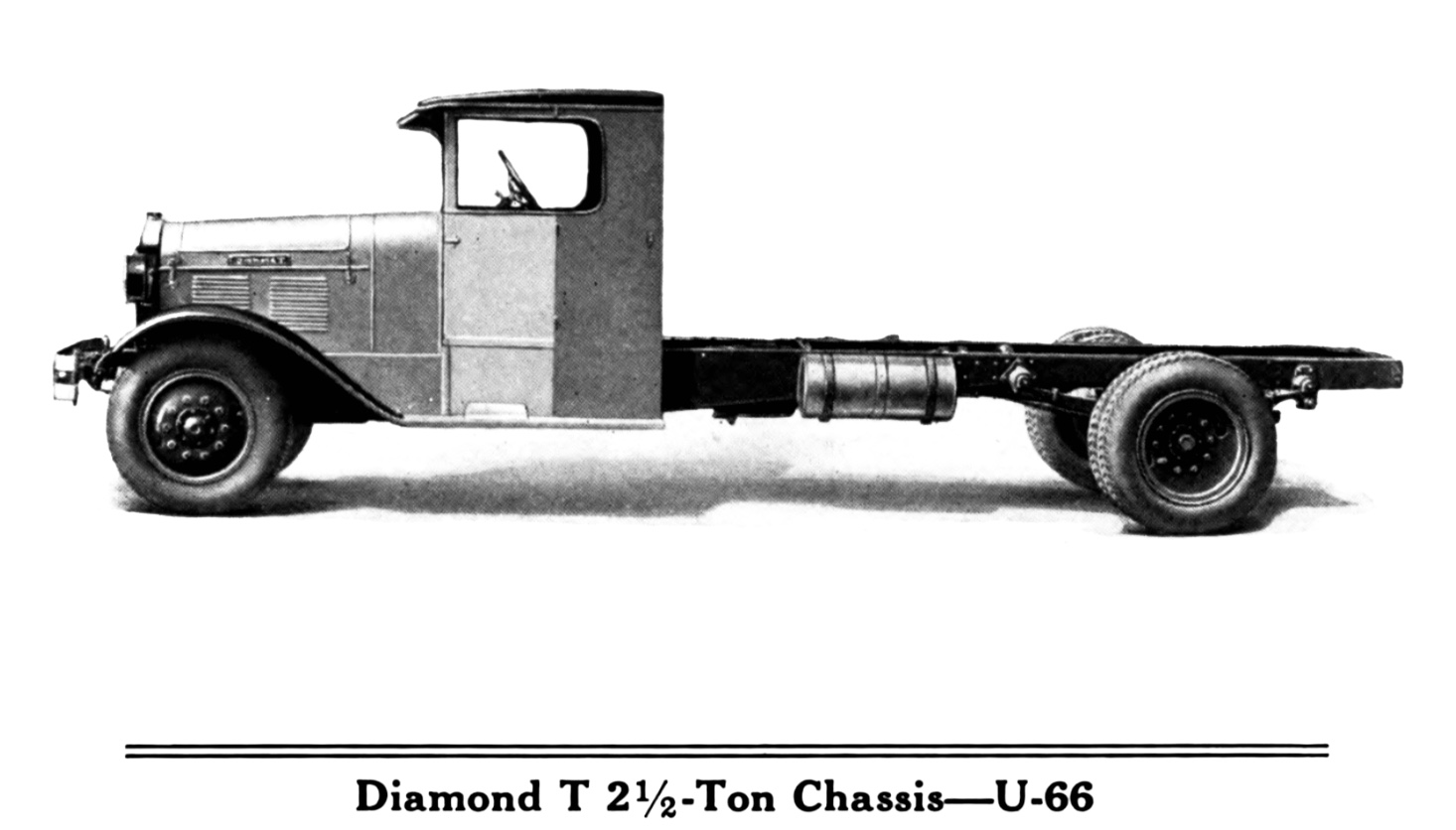
Diamond T U 66 (1928)

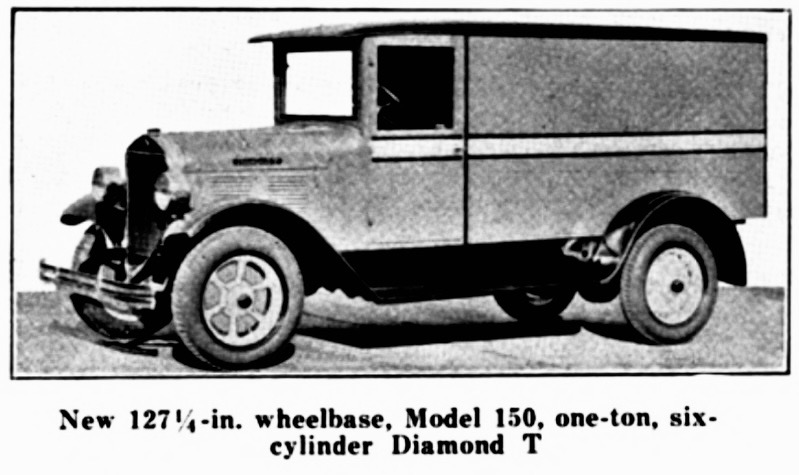
Diamond T Model 150 (1928)

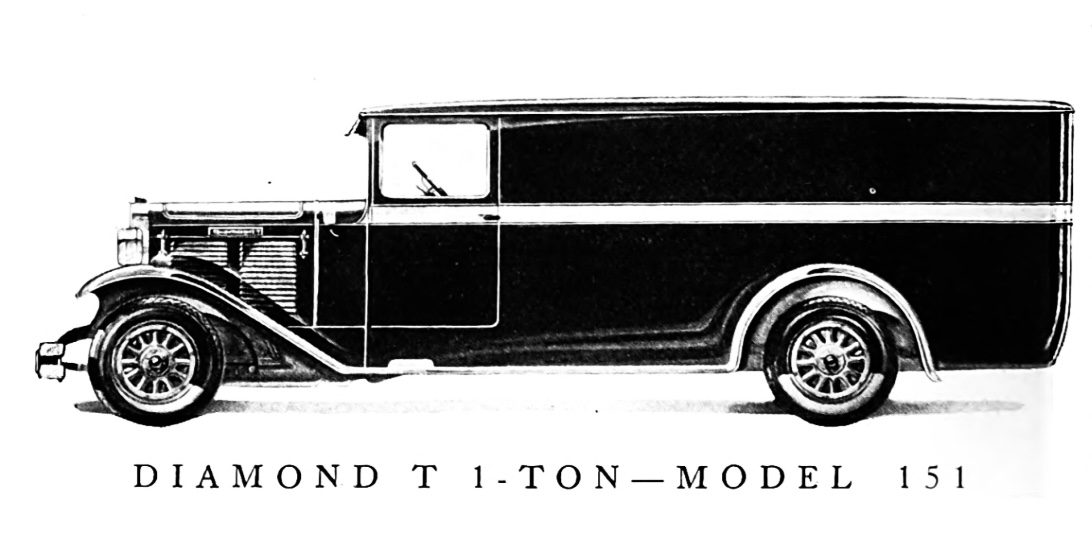
Diamond T 151 (1929-1930)

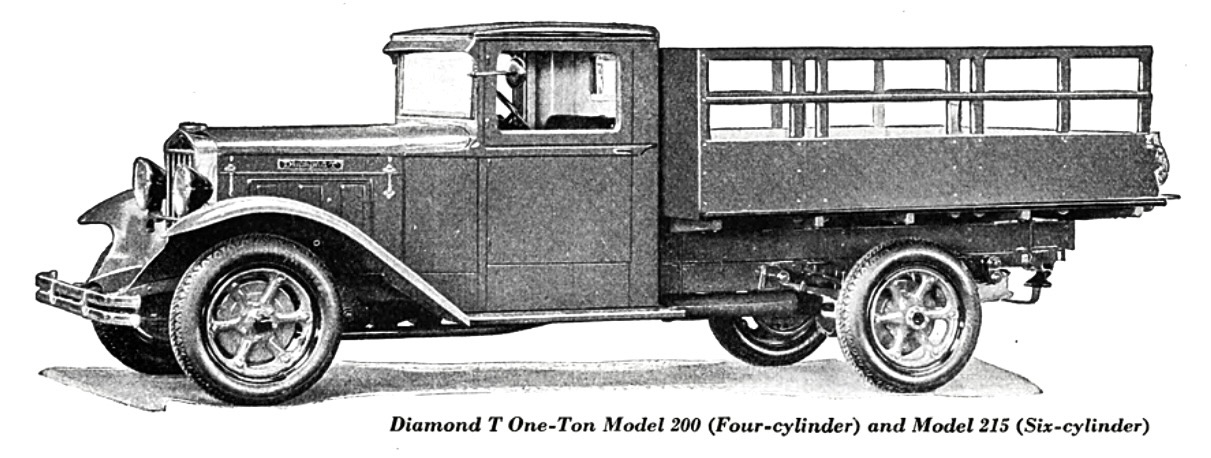
Diamond T Model 200 , Model 215 (1930-1932)

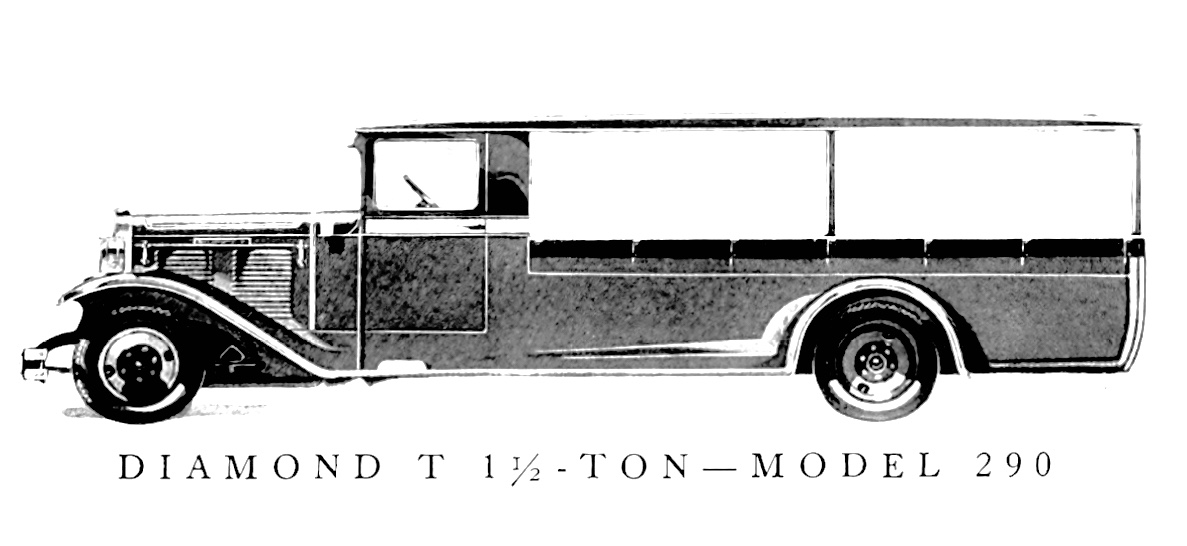
Diamond T 290 (1929-1930)

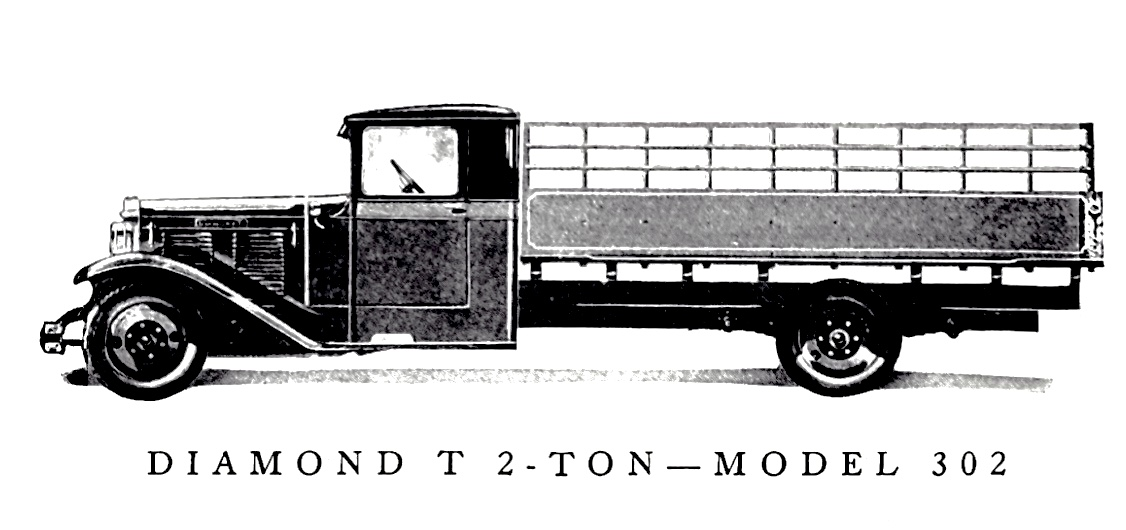
Diamond T 302 (1929)

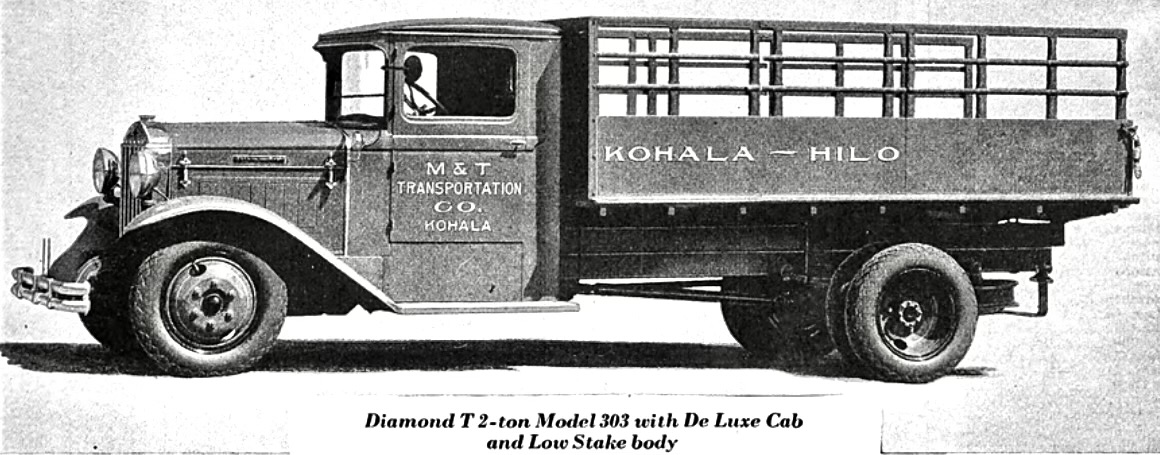
Diamond T Model 303 (1930-1932) 2 to

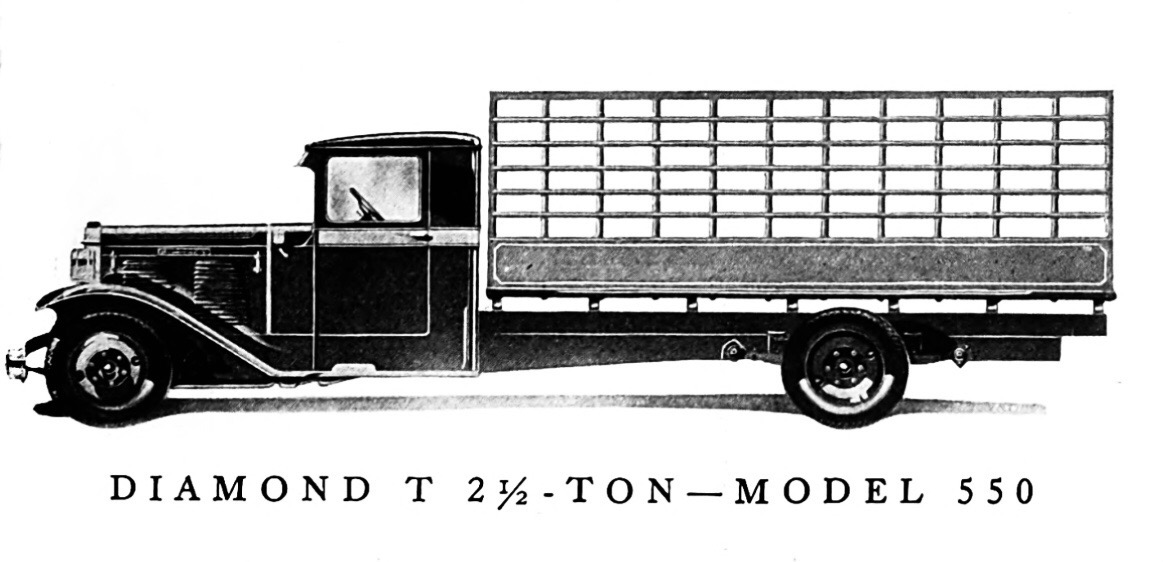
Diamond T 550 (1929)

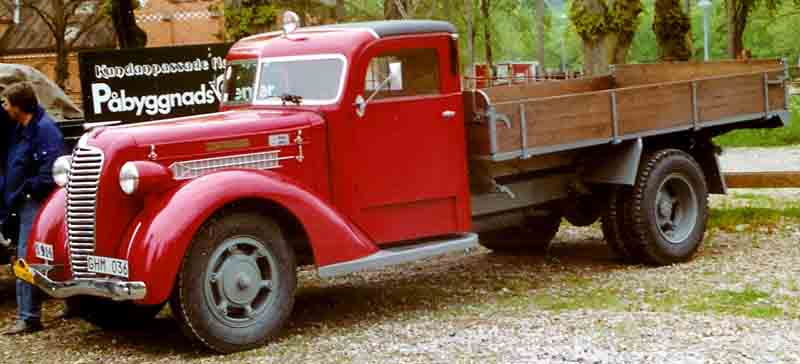
Diamond T truck 1937

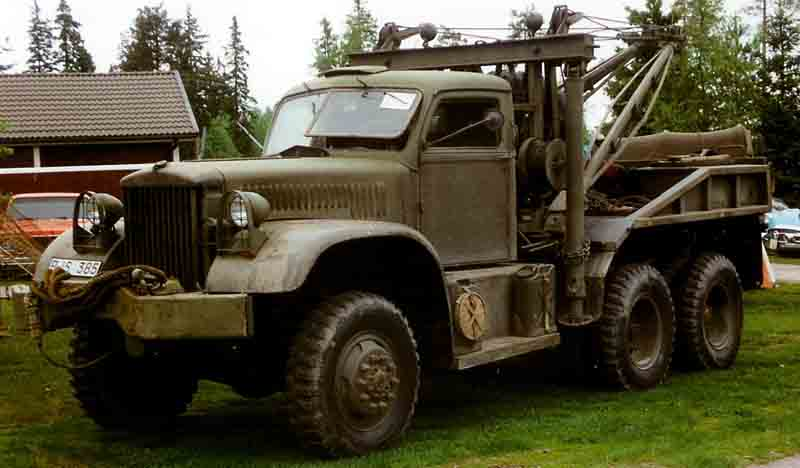
Diamond T wrecker 1941

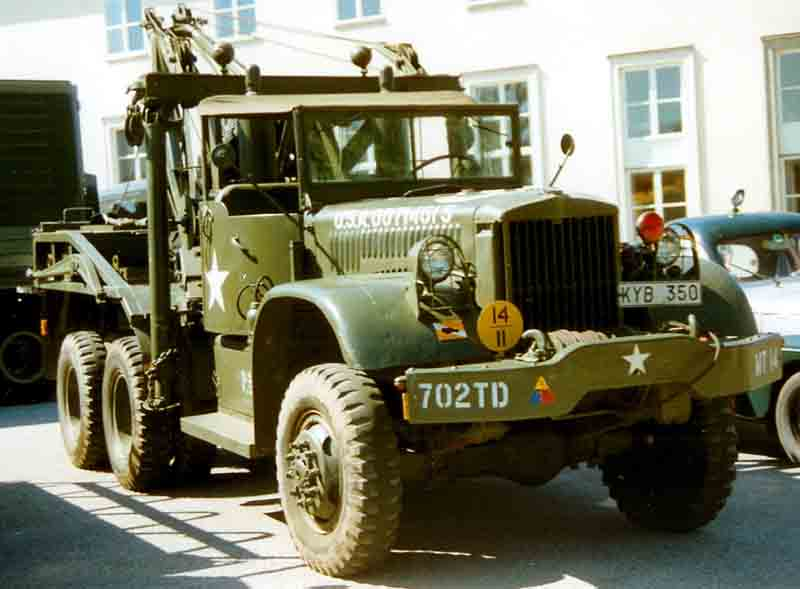
Diamond T 969A wrecker 1943

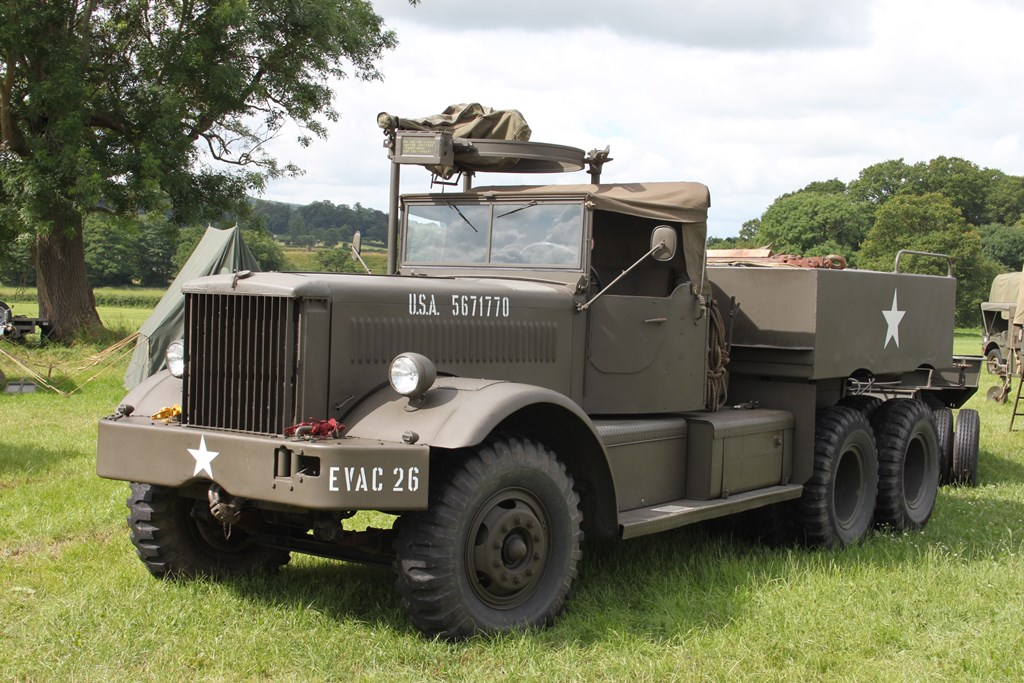
Diamond T 981 tank transporter

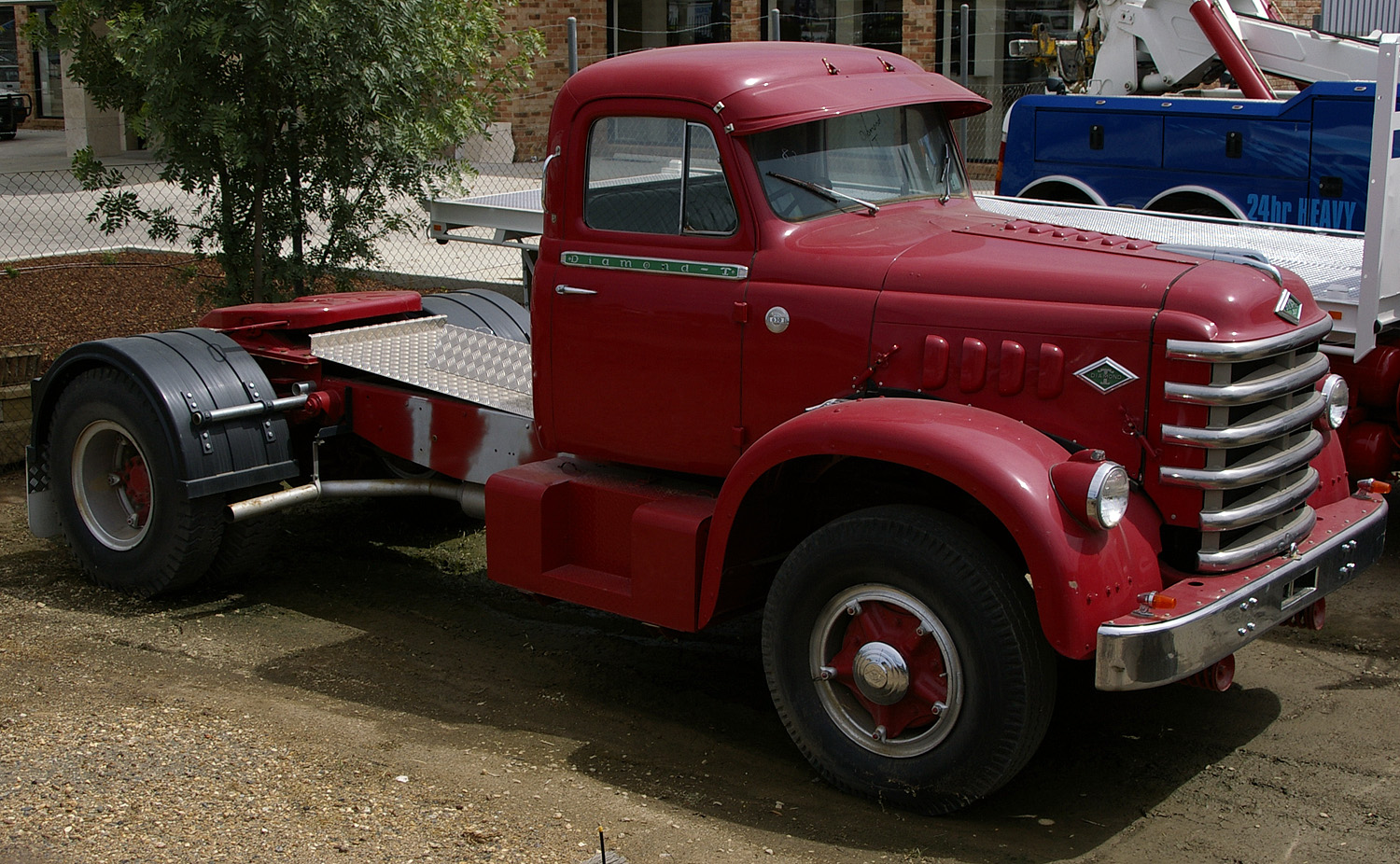
1958 Diamond T 630

== Cars ==
Diamond T produced automobiles in Chicago from 1905 to 1911. The models produced were powerful touring cars of up to 70 hp.

Model and Year	Engine	HP	Wheelbase
Diamond T (1907)	Four-cylinder	40	114″
Diamond T (1908)	Four-cylinder	50	114″
Diamond T (1909)	Four-cylinder	50	114″
Model D (1910)	Four-cylinder	35	108″
Model E (1910)	Four-cylinder	45	124″
Diamond T (1911)	Four-cylinder	45	124"

== Trucks ==
=== Commercial models ===
1928–1929 brought major mechanical improvements across the entire range. A closed cab with doors was introduced. All-wheel hydraulic drum brakes were used. Six-cylinder engines were available from Continental and Hercules for heavy trucks and a four-cylinder Buda powered light trucks. All trucks had geared-differential rear axles. By 1929 there were chassis load ratings (the weight of the body and payload) up to 12 tons (10,900 kg) on three axles.

1933–1935 In 1933 a new all-steel covered cab with doors and roll-up windows was introduced. In a 1935 model year style change it had been improved with a "streamlined" V-style windshield. This cab would be used on commercial and military trucks until replaced in 1951. In 1935 the trucks were also improved mechanically and new models were introduced. They developed through the rest of the 1930s. In 1935, Diamond T sold 6454 units and in 1936 it increased to 8750 trucks. In 1938, Diamond T sold 4393 units and in 1939 it increased to 5412 trucks. In 1940 Hercules six-cylinder gasoline and diesel engines up to 118 horsepower (88 kW) were used and Cummins diesels up to 200 horsepower (150 kW) were introduced in 1940.

1940–1942 In 1940 Hercules six-cylinder gasoline and diesel engines up to 118 horsepower (88 kW) were used and Cummins diesels up to 200 horsepower (150 kW) were introduced. In 1942 improved models went into production and then stopped after only 530 units for military production of tactical trucks and half-tracks.

1946–1947 Production of commercial trucks was stopped for military production in 1942. A small number of commercial trucks began to be built in 1944 and more in 1945. In 1946, the first year of full commercial production, there were five models, in 1947 there were fourteen. After World War II heavy trucks were measured by Gross Vehicle Weight Rating (GVWR), the total weight of the chassis, body, and payload. In 1947 there were chassis rated from 8,000 pounds (3,600 kg) to 36,000 pounds (16,000 kg) with conventional, sleeper, and COE models. Annual model changes were discontinued and many models continued unchanged until 1950. Gasoline and diesel engines were offered by Continental, Cummins, and Hercules. Single and tandem rear axles were available in many wheelbases.

=== Military models ===
Model 980/981 12-ton 6x4 trucks (G159) were ballast tractors used as tank transporters. Designed for the British military they were also used by the US Army. Powered by a 895 cubic inches (14.7 L) Hercules DFXE diesel engine developing 185 horsepower (138 kW) and geared very low, it could pull a trailer of up to 115,000 pounds (52,000 kg) and proved capable of the task of moving the heaviest tanks then in service. Early trucks used a standard Diamond T commercial cab (also used by the 4-ton G509 trucks). In August 1943 it was replaced with an open military cab. A long butterfly hood had vertical louvers along both sides.

A short ballast body was mounted behind a mid-mounted winch. There were closed tool compartments along both sides, two open containers in the front, and a bottom-hinged tailgate. The box could hold 18,000 pounds (8,200 kg) of ballast to increase traction on the rear tandem axles. When paired with the M9 Rogers trailer, the combination was designated the M19 tank transporter. A number of cars were delivered to the USSR under Lend-Lease during WWII.

Model 968 4-ton 6x6 truck (G509) Prime mover cargo trucks entered production as the standard 4-ton 6x6 chassis in 1941. It was produced with both a closed steel commercial-style cab and later an open military cab. It was designed to tow the 155 mm howitzer and carry its crew and ammunition. The chassis was used for different bodies, but the majority of 4-tons were Model 968s.

Standard models were powered by the 6 cyl., 529 cubic inches (8.7 L) Hercules RXC engine that developed 106 horsepower (79 kW) mated to a five speed manual transmission and two speed transfer case. The truck weighed 18,450 pounds (8,370 kg) and could tow 25,000 pounds (11,000 kg).

Model 967 was a pre-standard prime mover cargo truck (21 were built as wreckers). Produced in early 1941, it was fitted with Hercules RXB 501 cubic inches (8.2 L) inline six cylinder engine. Distinguishable by one piece brush guard on the front.

Model 969 Wrecker was the US Army's standard medium wrecker during World War II. It was equipped with the Holmes W-45 heavy-duty military wrecker bed with its twin boom and two 5-ton winches at the front of the bed as well as a front-mounted winch. A variety of other recovery equipment was carried, along with its own air compressor. It weighed 21,350 pounds (9,680 kg) and could tow 25,000 pounds (11,000 kg).

Model 970 Cargo truck was designed to carry bridging pontoons. The bed is 16 inches (406.40 mm) longer than the 968.

Model 972 dump truck was the largest dump truck the US Army had during World War II. Originally they were not fitted with front winches in order to reduce front axle loading. After a Corps of Engineers request, winches were fitted from June 1944 onwards.

Model 975 was a bridge truck built for Canada.

== Production models ==
The pre-assigned serial numbers only indicate the maximum possible production quantity.

Year	Production figures	Model	Load capacity	Serial number
1916	73	JA	0,75 to	1001 to 1073
	76	JB	1 to	3001 to 3076
		J5	1 to	
		J2	1,5 to	
	849	J4	1,5 to	1151 to 1999
		J3	2 to	
	78	L	3,5 to	801 to 878
	250	LB	3,5 to	901 to 1150
		R	5 to	
Sum	~ 1,000			
1917		J5	1 to	3501 to 4999
	↑ (s. 1916)	J4	1,5 to	1151 to 1999
		J3	2 to	
	↑ (s. 1916)	LB	3,5 to	901 to 1150
		R	5 to	
Sum				
1918	↑ (s. 1917)	J5	1 to	3501 to 4999
	↑ (s. 1917)	J4	1,5 to	1151 to 1999
	500	J3	2 to	2501 to 3000
	↑ (s. 1916)	LB	3,5 to	901 to 1150
	64	R	5 to	751 to 814
	1,501	S	5 to	10500 to 12000
	7,999	T	1.5 to	12001 to 19999
	↑	FS	1,5 to	12001 to 19999
Sum				
1919	↑ (s. 1917)	J5	1 to	3501 to 4999
	↑ (s. 1917)	J4	1,5 to	1151 to 1999
	↑ (s. 1918)	T	1.5 to	12001 to 19999
	↑	FS	1,5 to	12001 to 19999
	↑ (s. 1918)	J3	2 to	2501 to 3000
	↑ (s. 1916)	LB	3,5 to	901 to 1150
		R	5 to	10001 to
	↑ (s. 1918)	S	5 to	10500 to 12900
Sum				
1920		T	1,5 to	
	374	Farm Special	1,5 to	12261 to 12634
	388	U	2 to	20000 to 20387
	196	LB	3,5 to	5687 to 5882
	2	R	5 to	10145 to 10146
	15	S	5 to	10542 to 10556
	172	J3	2 to	8595 to 8766
Sum	> 900			
1921		O3	1 to	50000 to
	↑( s. 1920)	T	1,5 to	12261 to 12634
	↑	Farm Special	1,5 to	
	169	U	2 to	20388 to 20556
	33	K	3,5 to	30111 to 30143
	7	EL	5 to	40021 to 40027
	79	S	5 to	10558 to 10636
Sum	> 400			
1922	93	O3	1 to	60011 to 60103
	113	T	1,5 to	12636 to 12748
	↑	Farm Special	1,5 to	12636 to 12748
	562	U	2 to	20556 to 21117
	189	K	3,5 to	30144 to 30332
	11	EL	5 to	40028 to 40038
	135	S	5 to	10542 to 10676
Sum	1,103			
1923	170	O3	1,25 to	60104 to 60273
	215	T	1,5 to	12749 to 12963
	591	U2	2,5 to	90001 to 90591
	263	K	3,5 to	30333 to 30595
	25	EL	5 to	40039 to 40063
	42	S	5 to	10677 to 10718
	76	75	0,75-1 to	81001 to 81076
Sum	1,382			
1924	419	75	1 to	81077 to 81495
	7	O4	1,25 to	50201 to 50207
	25	T2	1,5 to	13201 to 13224
	509	U2	2,5 to	90592 to 91100
	165	K	3,5 to	30596 to 30760
	37	S	5 to	10719 to 10755
Sum	1,161			
1925			to	
			to	
			to	
Sum				
1926			to	
			to	
			to	
Sum				
1927			to	
			to	
			to	
Sum				
1928			to	
			to	
			to	
Sum	2,308			
1929		151	1 to	33601 to
		290	1,5 to	51501 to
		302	2 to	42976 to
		550	2,5 to	61001 to
		400	2 to	74113 to
		502	2,5 to	95196 to
		505	2,5 to	95196 to
		U56SP	3 to	23282 to
		700	3,5to	32058 to
		800	4 to	63045 to
		600	3 to	23701 to
		601	3 to	23801 to
		602	3 to	24001 to
		605	3 to	19551 to
		1000	5 to	40201 to
		1600	8 to	31301 to
		2500	10-12 to	11101 to
Sum	3,590			
1930			to	
			to	
			to	
Sum	2,888			
1931			to	
			to	
			to	
Sum	2,483			
1932			to	
			to	
			to	
Sum	2,250			
1933			to	
	6	Diamond T Doodlebug	to	
	4,139		to	
Sum				
1934			to	
			to	
			to	
Sum	5,440			
1935			to	
			to	
			to	
Sum	6,454			
1936			to	
			to	
			to	
Sum	8,750			
1937			to	
			to	
			to	
Sum	8,118			
1938			to	
			to	
			to	
Sum	4,393			
1939			to	
			to	
			to	
Sum	5,412			
1940			to	
			to	
			to	
Sum	6,354			
1941		M20	8 to	
		968	4 to	
			to	
Sum	6,077			

== See also ==
- List of automobile manufacturers
- Diamond T tank transporter
- Diamond T Doodlebug
