= Diamond Reo Trucks =

Australian Truck manufacturer

- Industry: Automotive
- Predecessor: Diamond T Motor Truck Co. REO Motor Car Co.
- Founded: 1967; 59 years ago
- Fate: Discontinued in 1995 but later revived in Australia
- Products: Trucks
- Parent: Daysworth International

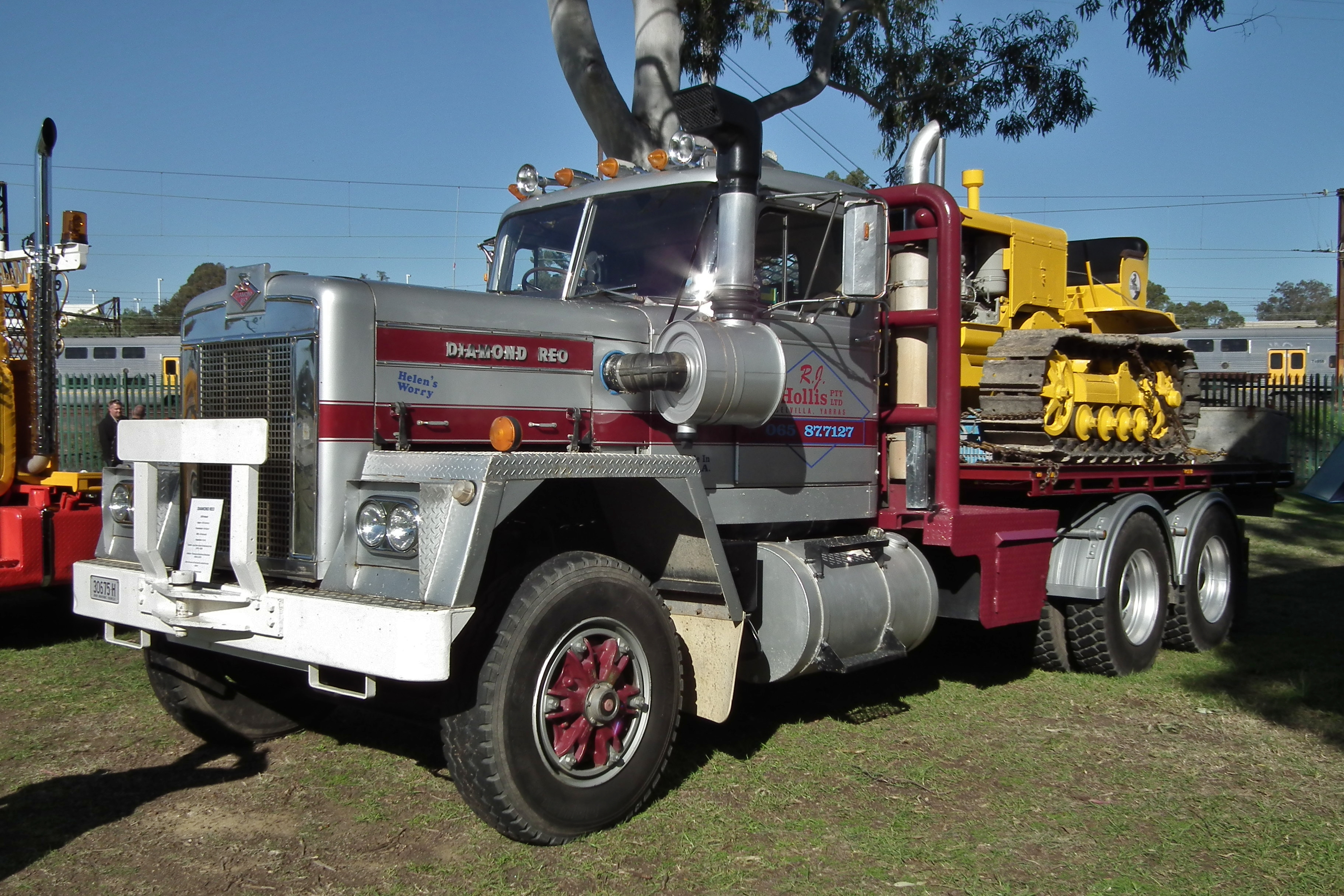
A 1970 Diamond REO truck in Penrith, New South Wales, Australia.

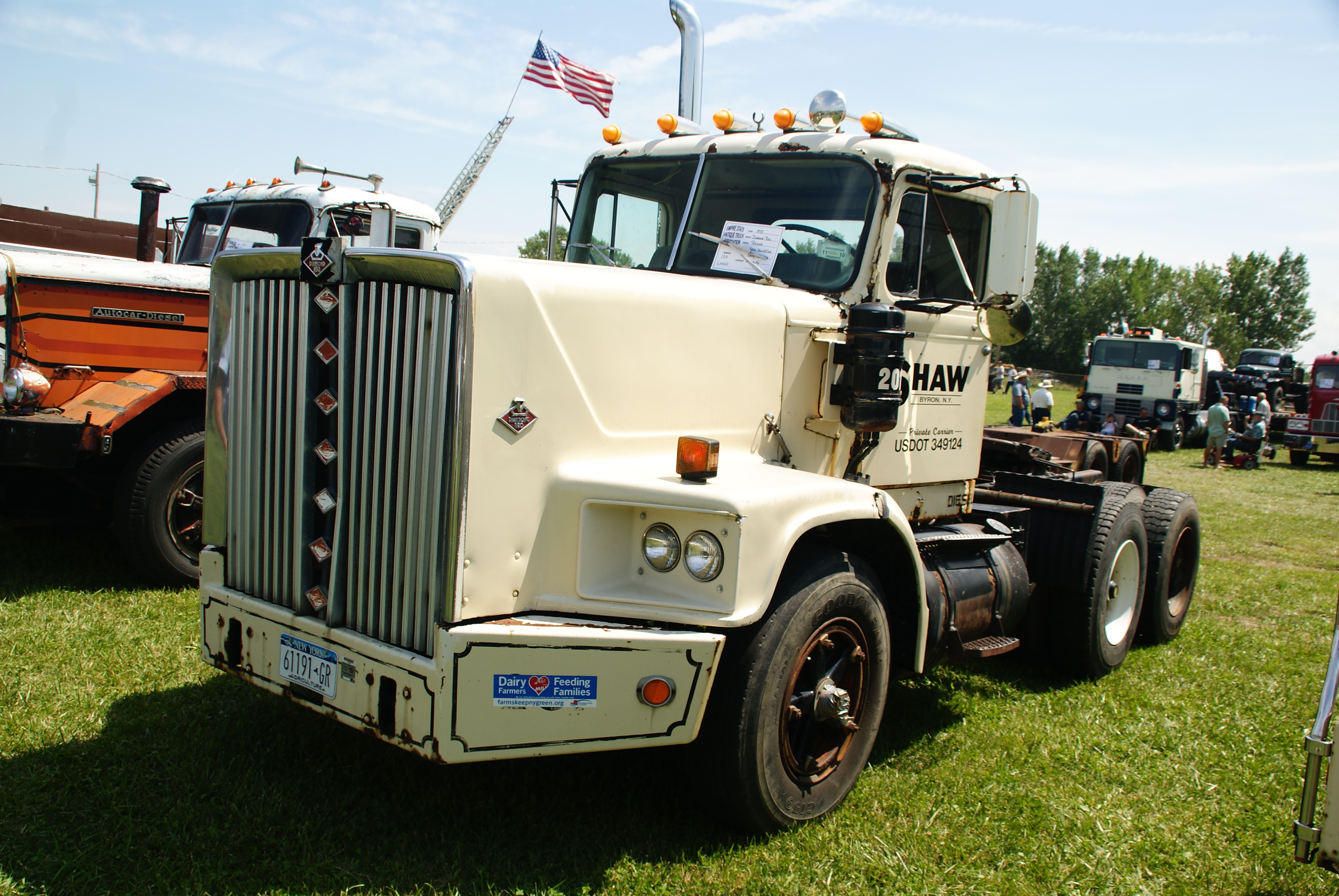
A Diamond Reo truck at a show

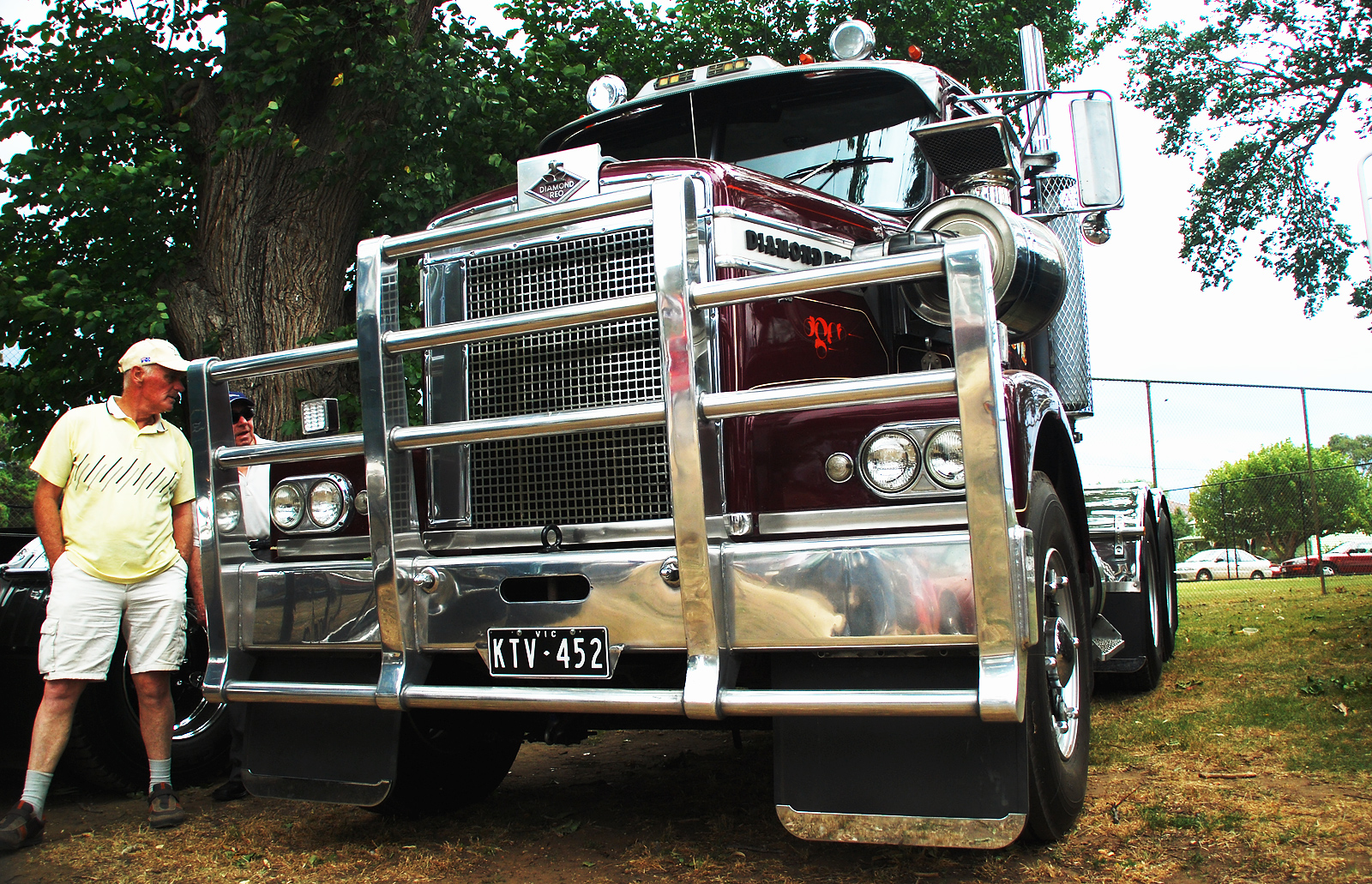
A 1971 Diamond Reo C114 in Australia

Diamond Reo Trucks is an Australian truck manufacturer, formerly American. In 1967, Diamond T and Reo Trucks were combined to form the Diamond Reo Trucks Division of White Motor Corporation. Reo dated back to 1904 when Ransom E. Olds, founder of Oldsmobile, began building motor cars, and Diamond T dated back to 1905 when C. A. Tilt began building vehicles.

In 1971, Francis L. Cappaert of Birmingham, Alabama, bought Diamond Reo from White and formed an independent company called Diamond Reo Trucks Inc. And, at about the same time the Diamond Reo C-116 series was introduced, which featured Cummins NTC-335, NTC-350, NTA-370 and Detroit Diesel 12V-71N engines. Despite new model introductions and excellent reputation Diamond Reo was forced into bankruptcy on December 6, 1974.

One year later Loyal Osterlund and partner Ray Houseal bought the rights to Diamond Reo trucks and made room to continue production in their Harrisburg, Pennsylvania, facility, originally a dealership and maintenance facility. The single model C-116 Giant was continued in production with the Cummins NTC-290 diesel engine as standard power. Production for 1978 was 131 units. By 1985, the Harrisburg plant was expanded to be able to produce 10 trucks per day, although output continued at about two per day. The company continued to build about 150 Class 8 trucks annually through 1995 all as Diamond Vehicle Solutions LLC.

In the early 2000s Diamond Vehicle Solutions marketed the T-Line series described as "a blend of vintage Diamond T heritage and modern engineering". The T-Line's series included one long-nose and two medium-nose models with the company manufacturing frames and other parts, and outfits basic cabs it obtained from Navistar; it offered Caterpillar and Cummins diesels, Eaton and Allison transmissions, and Dana and Meritor axles. These trucks were manufactured until 2010 with parts manufacturing lasting until 2013.Diamond Vehicle Solutions is now doing business as T-Line Trucks & Chassis; and in May 2015, T-Line announced that it intended to resume production of Class 6, 7, and 8 trucks and tractors, mostly for vocational use. T-Line will also produce glider kits and complete "made-to-order" trucks. However the trucks would be branded as "T-Line" however the models would be inspired by Diamond T and Diamond Reo models.

== Recent developments ==
Diamond Vehicle Solutions is now doing business as T-Line Trucks & Chassis; and in May 2015, T-Line announced that it intended to resume production of Class 6, 7, and 8 trucks and tractors, mostly for vocational use. T-Line will also produce glider kits and complete "made-to-order" trucks.

Daysworth International, a manufacturer of Terminal tractors, revived the Diamond Reo brand making Diamond Reo an Australian company.

== Original (1967 - 1974) Diamond Reo truck series ==
Conventional

- C-990
- C-90 and C-90D
- C-92 "Apollo"
- C-101 and DC-101 "Apollo"
- C-114
- C-116 "Apollo"
- C-119 "Raider"

Cabover

- CO-50 without sleeper and CO-78 with sleeper
- CO-54 and CO-88 "Royale"
- "Royale II"
- Giant

Inter-City Service

- CF-55
- CF-59
- CF-65
- CF-83
- "The Rogue"
