= 19th century =

One hundred years, from 1801 to 1900

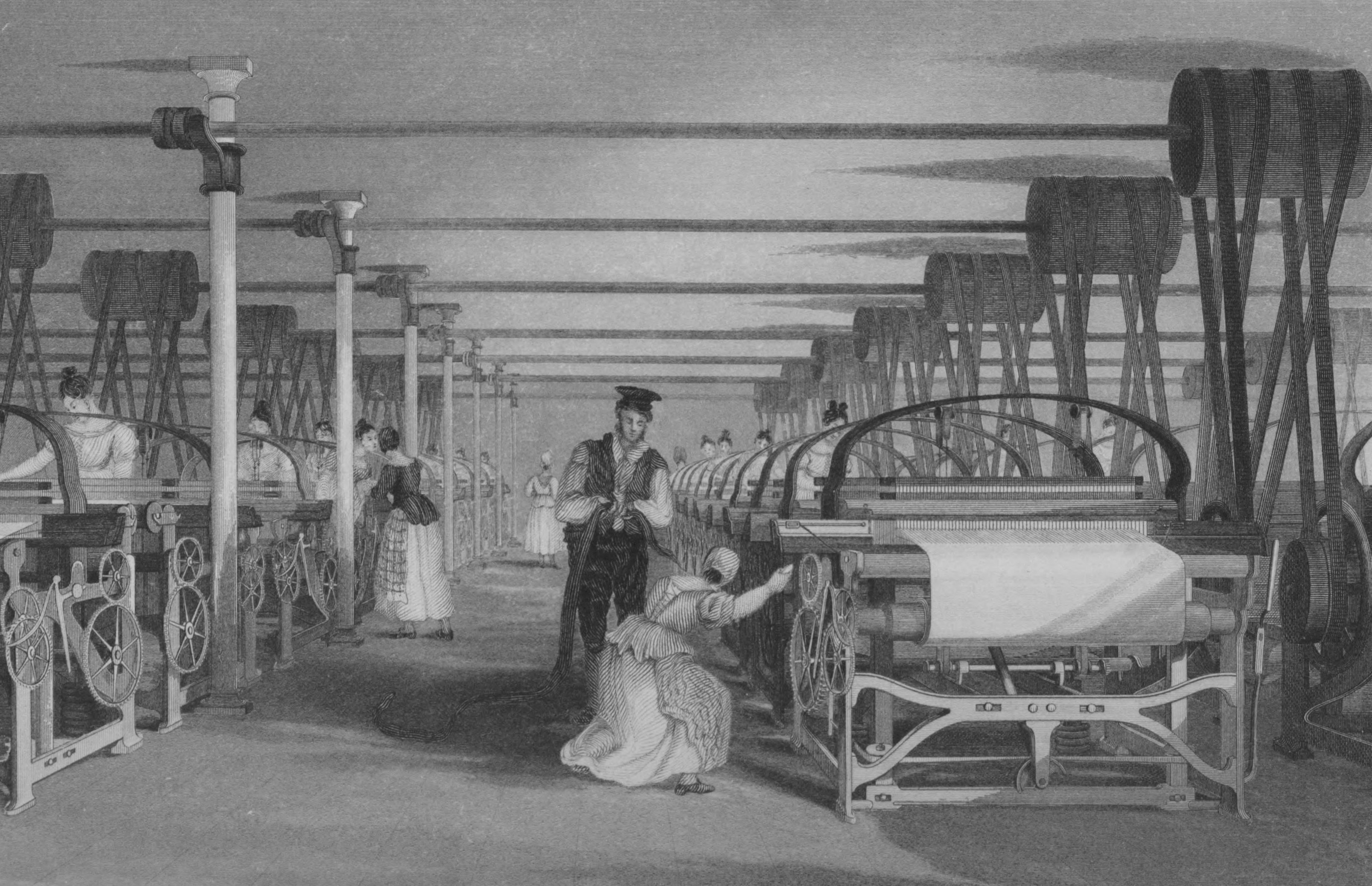
An 1835 illustration of power loom weaving, as part of the Industrial Revolution

The 19th century began on 1 January 1801 and ended on 31 December 1900. It was the 9th century of the 2nd millennium. It was characterized by vast social upheaval. Slavery was abolished in much of Europe and the Americas. The First Industrial Revolution, though it began in the late 18th century, expanded beyond its British homeland for the first time during the 19th century, particularly remaking the economies and societies of the Low Countries, France, the Rhineland, Northern Italy, and the Northeastern United States. A few decades later, the Second Industrial Revolution led to ever more massive urbanization and much higher levels of productivity, profit, and prosperity, a pattern that continued into the 20th century. The Catholic Church, in response to the growing influence and power of modernism, secularism and materialism, formed the First Vatican Council in the late 19th century to deal with such problems and confirm certain Catholic doctrines as dogma. Religious missionaries were sent from the Americas and Europe to Asia, Africa and the Middle East.

In the Middle East, it was an era of change and reform. The Islamic gunpowder empires fell into decline and European imperialism brought much of South Asia, Southeast Asia, and almost all of Africa under colonial rule. Reformers were opposed at every turn by conservatives who strove to maintain the centuries-old Islamic laws and social order. The 19th century also saw the collapse of the large Spanish, Portuguese, French and Mughal empires, which paved the way for the growing influence of the British, French, German, Russian, Austro-Hungarian, Italian, and Japanese empires along with the United States.

The defeat of France in the Napoleonic Wars marked the end of France’s status as the world superpower. Britain now claimed this status, and the British and Russian empires expanded considerably, becoming two of the world's leading powers. Russia expanded its territory to the Caucasus and Central Asia. The Ottoman Empire underwent a period of Westernization and reform known as the Tanzimat, vastly increasing its control over core territories in the Middle East. However, it remained in decline and became known as the sick man of Europe, losing territory in the Balkans and North Africa.

The remaining powers in the Indian subcontinent, such as the Maratha and Sikh empires, suffered a massive decline, and their dissatisfaction with the British East India Company's rule led to the Indian Rebellion of 1857 and the company's dissolution. India was later ruled directly by the British Crown through the establishment of the British Raj. During the post-Napoleonic era (after 1815), Britain enforced what became known as the Pax Britannica, which ushered in unprecedented globalization on a massive scale. Britain's overseas possessions grew rapidly in the first half of the century, especially with the expansion of vast territories in Canada, Australia, India, and in the last two decades of the century in Africa. By the end of the 19th century, the British controlled a fifth of the world's land and a quarter of the world's population. After the Napoleonic Wars, France sought to rebuild its colonial empire, having lost most of its major overseas possessions to the British in the 17th and 18th centuries, including territories in North America (modern-day United States and Canada), French India, and much of the Caribbean. French expansion resumed in the 19th century, beginning with the conquest of Algeria in 1830 and the establishment of influence in Africa. French overseas possessions expanded gradually in the second half of the century, and France significantly enlarged its colonial holdings, establishing French Indochina in Southeast Asia, French Polynesia, New Caledonia and the New Hebrides in Oceania and controlling over 40% of Africa. By the end of the 19th century, France possessed the second largest colonial empire in the world after the British Empire. It controlled over 13.5 million km^{2} or 1/10 of the world’s land area, and exerted significant influence in East Asia through spheres of influence in China.

By the end of the century, Britain and France had colonized almost all of South Asia (British Raj), Southeast Asia (French Indochina), 80% of Africa and Oceania (Australia, New Zealand, French Polynesia, New Caledonia, New Hebrides). In East Asia, China under the Qing dynasty endured its century of humiliation by foreign powers with Britain and France carving up spheres of influences in China that lasted until the first half of the 20th century. The last surviving man and woman, respectively, verified to have been born in the 19th century were Jiroemon Kimura (1897–2013) and Nabi Tajima (1900–2018), both Japanese.

== Overview ==
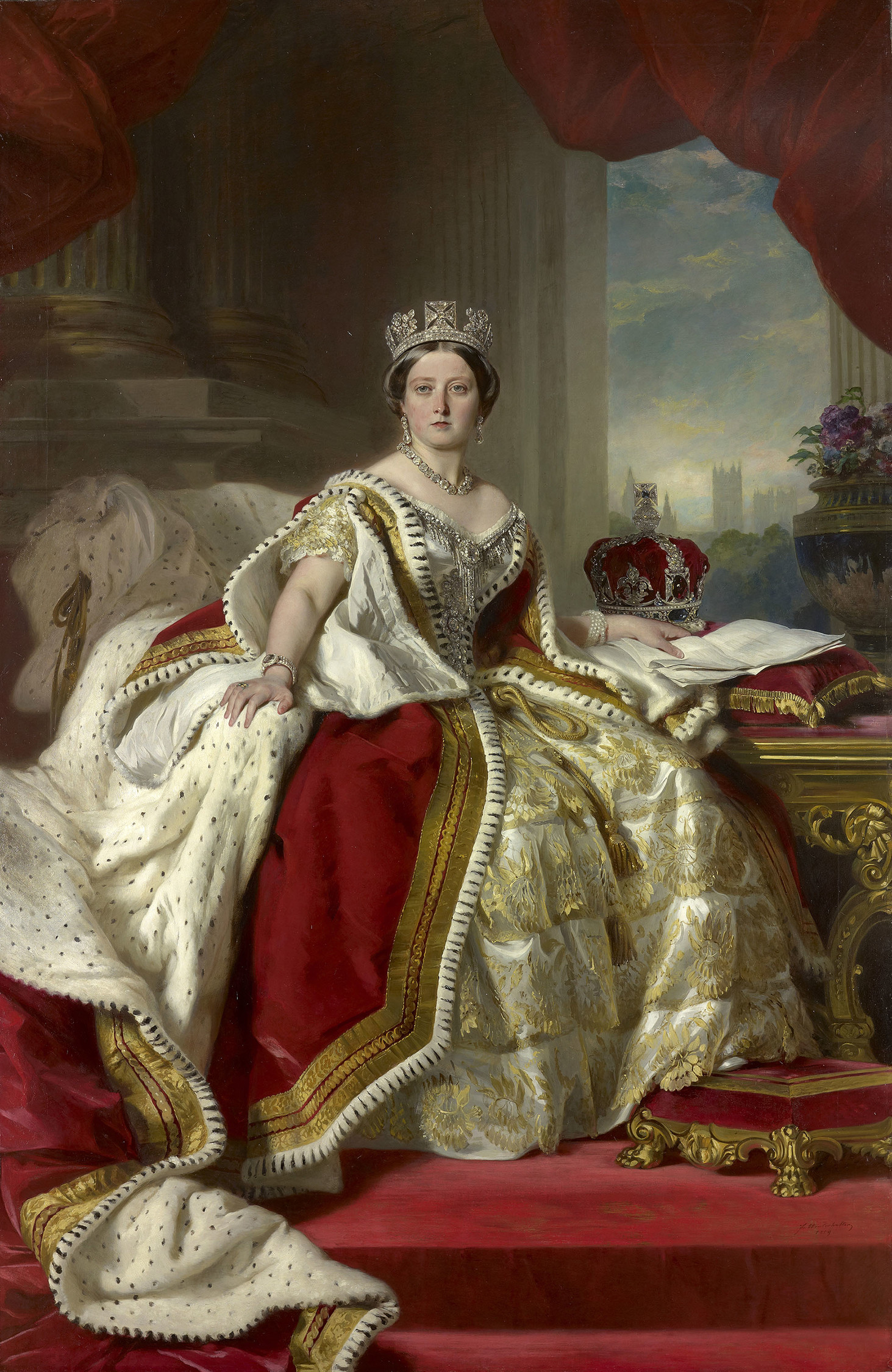
Official portrait of Queen Victoria, 1859

The first electronics appeared in the 19th century, with the introduction of the electric relay in 1835, the telegraph and its Morse code protocol in 1837, the first telephone call in 1876, and the first functional light bulb in 1878.

The 19th century was an era of rapidly accelerating scientific discovery and invention, with significant developments in the fields of mathematics, physics, chemistry, biology, electricity, and metallurgy that laid the groundwork for the technological advances of the 20th century. The Industrial Revolution began in Great Britain and spread to continental Europe, North America, and Japan. The Victorian era was notorious for the employment of young children in factories and mines, as well as strict social norms regarding modesty and gender roles. Japan embarked on a program of rapid modernization following the Meiji Restoration, before defeating China, under the Qing dynasty, in the First Sino-Japanese War. Advances in medicine and the understanding of human anatomy and disease prevention took place in the 19th century, and were partly responsible for rapidly accelerating population growth in the Western world. Europe's population doubled during the 19th century, from approximately 200 million to more than 400 million. The introduction of railroads provided the first major advancement in land transportation for centuries, changing the way people lived and obtained goods, and fuelling major urbanization movements in countries across the globe. Numerous cities worldwide surpassed populations of a million or more during this century. London became the world's largest city and capital of the British Empire. Its population increased from 1 million in 1800 to 6.7 million a century later. The last remaining undiscovered landmasses of Earth, including vast expanses of interior Africa and Asia, were explored during this century, and with the exception of the extreme zones of the Arctic and Antarctic, accurate and detailed maps of the globe were available by the 1890s. Liberalism became the pre-eminent reform movement in Europe.

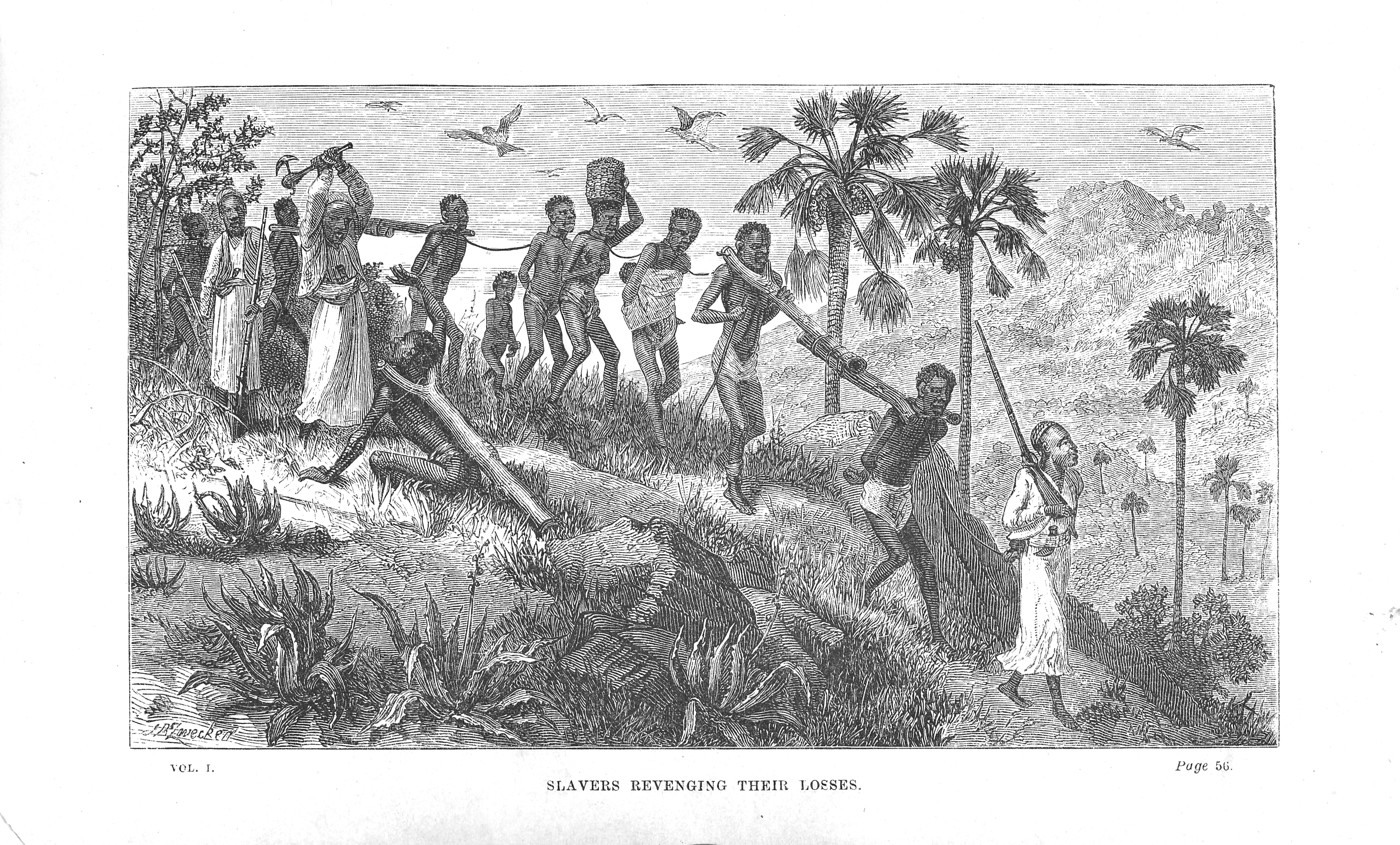
Arab slave traders and their captives along the Ruvuma River, 19th century

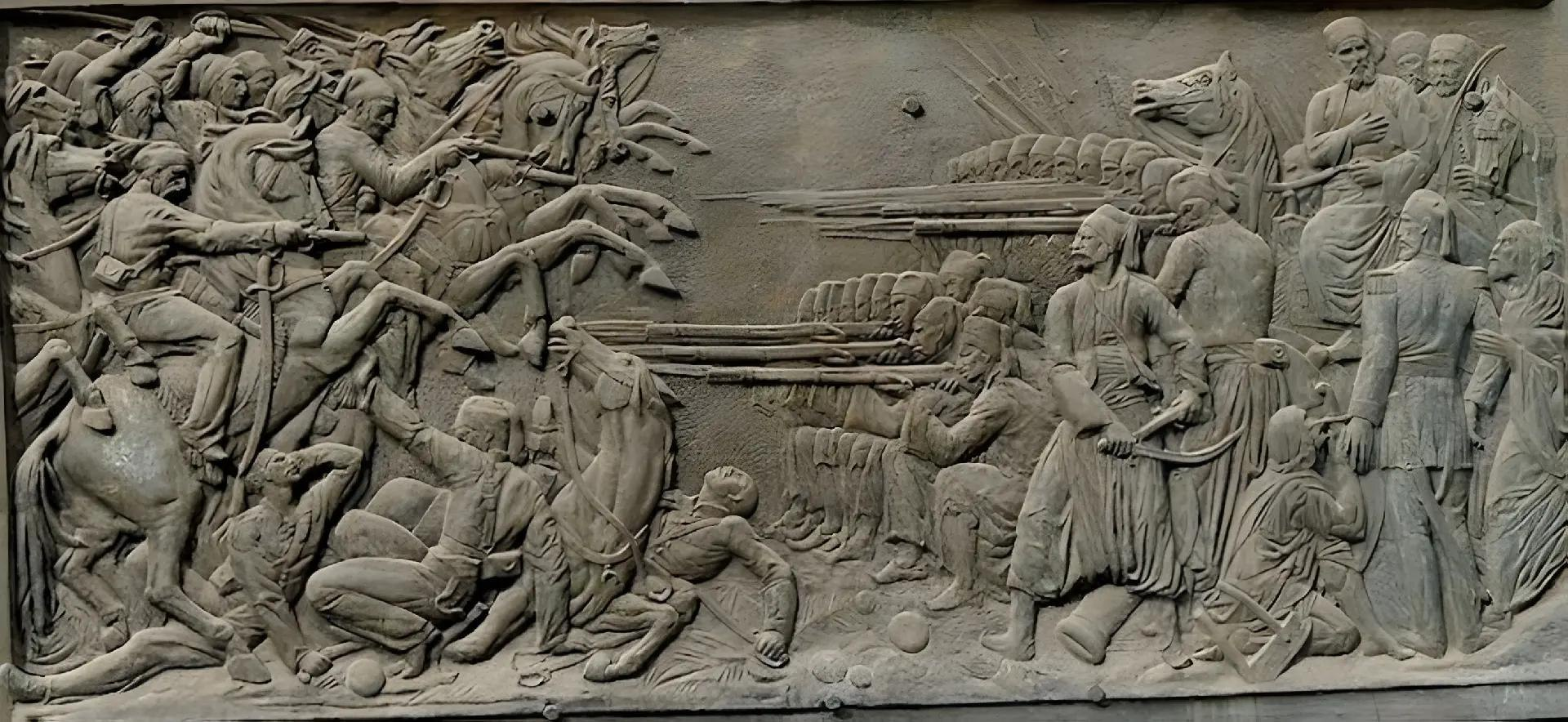
Illustration of the Battle of Konya of the Egyptian–Ottoman War (1831–1833)

Slavery was greatly reduced around the world. Following a successful slave revolt in Haiti, Britain and France stepped up the battle against the Barbary pirates and succeeded in stopping their enslavement of Europeans. The UK's Slavery Abolition Act 1833 charged the British Royal Navy with ending the global slave trade. The first colonial empire in the century to abolish slavery was the British, who did so in 1834. America's Thirteenth Amendment following their Civil War abolished slavery there in 1865, and in Brazil slavery was abolished in 1888 (see abolitionism). Similarly, serfdom was abolished in Russia in 1861.

The 19th century was remarkable in the widespread formation of new settlement foundations which were particularly prevalent across North America and Australia, with a significant proportion of the two continents' largest cities being founded at some point in the century. Chicago in the United States and Melbourne in Australia were non-existent in the earliest decades but grew to become the 2nd largest cities in the United States and British Empire respectively by the end of the century. In the 19th century, approximately 70 million people left Europe, with most migrating to the United States.

The 19th century also saw the rapid creation, development, and codification of many sports, particularly in Britain and the United States. Association football, rugby union, baseball, and many other sports were developed during the 19th century, while the British Empire facilitated the rapid spread of sports such as cricket to many different parts of the world. Also, women's fashion was a very sensitive topic during this time, as women showing their ankles was viewed to be scandalous.

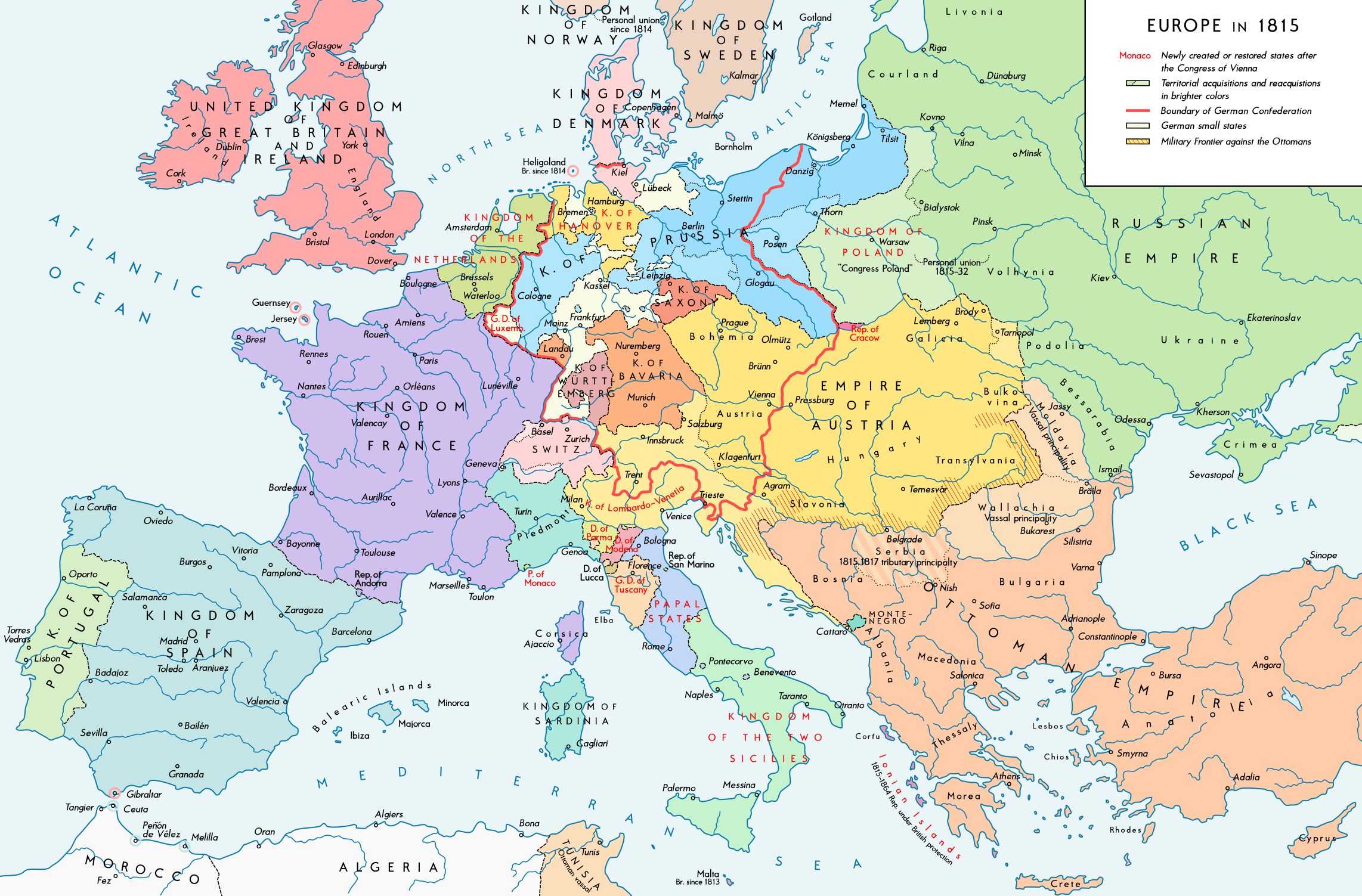
The boundaries set by the Congress of Vienna, 1815

It also marks the fall of the Ottoman rule of the Balkans which led to the creation of Serbia, Bulgaria, Montenegro, and Romania as a result of the second Russo-Turkish War, which in itself followed the great Crimean War.

=== Eras ===
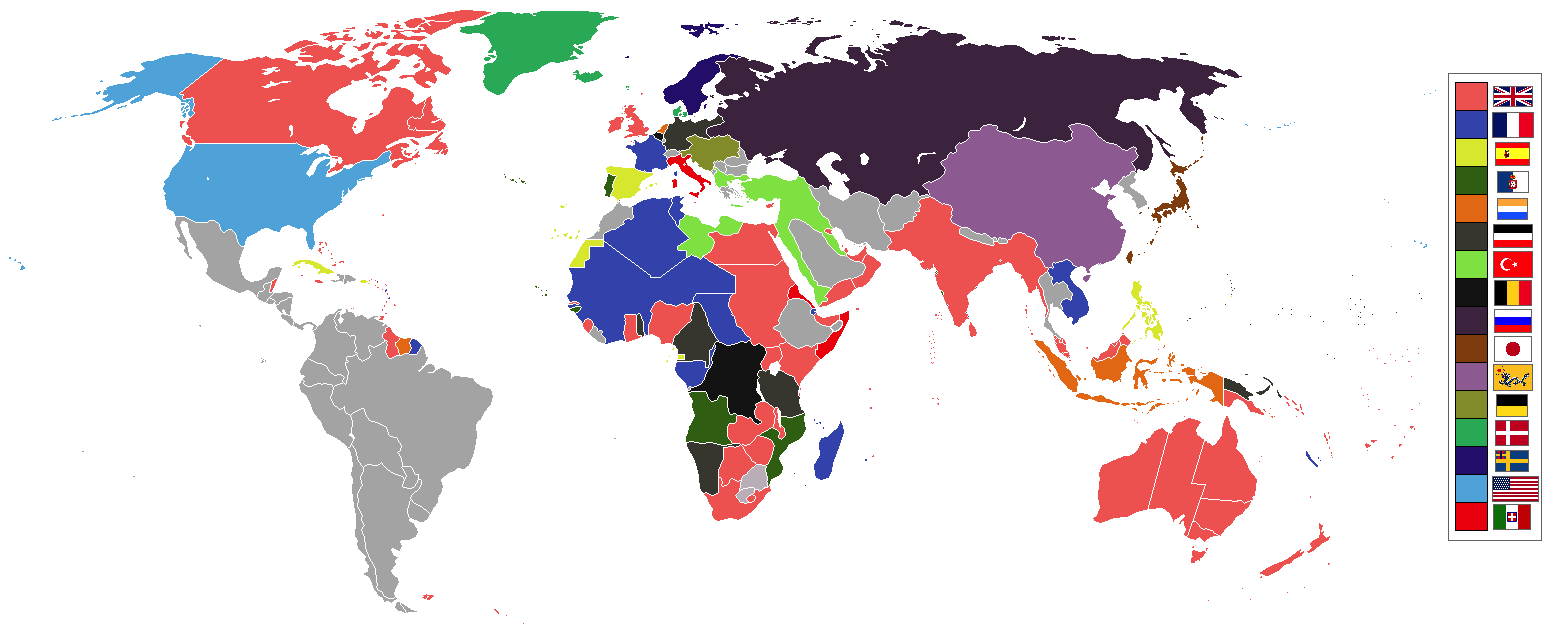
Map of the world from 1897. The British Empire (marked in pink) was the superpower of the 19th century.

- Industrial Revolution
- European imperialism
- British Regency, Victorian era (UK, British Empire)
- Bourbon Restoration, July Monarchy, French Second Republic, Second French Empire, French Third Republic (France)
- Risorgimento (Italy)
- Belle Époque (Europe)
- Edo period, Meiji period (Japan)
- Qing dynasty (China)
- Nguyen dynasty (Vietnam)
- Joseon dynasty (Korea)
- Zulu Kingdom (South Africa)
- Tanzimat, First Constitutional Era (Ottoman Empire)
- Russian Empire
- Greek War of Independence
- Era of Good Feelings, Manifest destiny, Antebellum era, Reconstruction era, American frontier, Gilded Age (United States)

== Wars ==
=== Napoleonic Wars ===
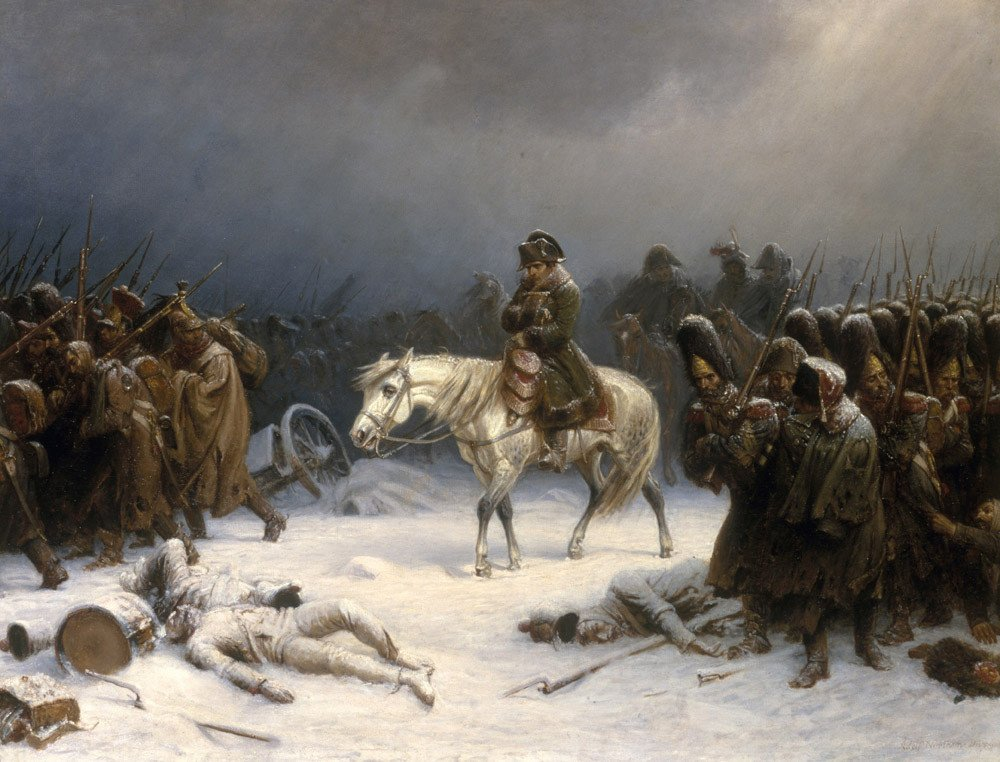
Napoleon's retreat from Russia in 1812. The war is turning decisively against the French Empire.

The Napoleonic Wars were a series of major conflicts from 1803 to 1815 pitting the French Empire and its allies, led by Napoleon I, against a fluctuating array of European powers formed into various coalitions, financed and usually led by the United Kingdom. The wars stemmed from the unresolved disputes associated with the French Revolution and its resultant conflict.

In the aftermath of the French Revolution, Napoleon Bonaparte gained power in France in 1799. In 1804, he crowned himself Emperor of the French.

In 1805, the French victory over an Austrian-Russian army at the Battle of Austerlitz ended the War of the Third Coalition. As a result of the Treaty of Pressburg, the Holy Roman Empire was dissolved.

Later efforts were less successful. In the Peninsular War, France unsuccessfully attempted to establish Joseph Bonaparte as King of Spain. In 1812, the French invasion of Russia had massive French casualties, and was a turning point in the Napoleonic Wars.

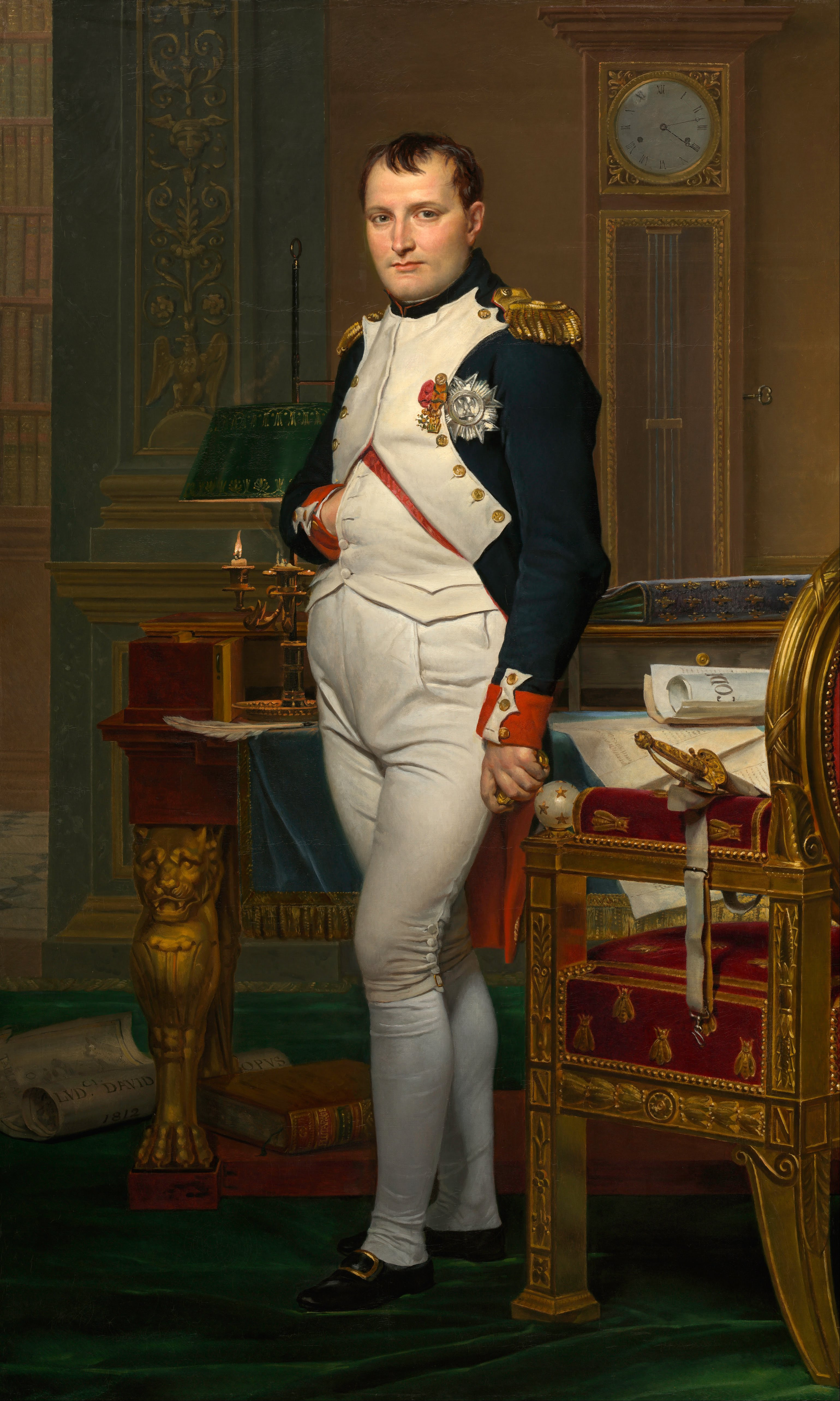
Napoleon Bonaparte, Emperor of the First French Empire

In 1814, after defeat in the War of the Sixth Coalition, Napoleon abdicated and was exiled to Elba. Later that year, he escaped exile and began the Hundred Days before finally being defeated at the Battle of Waterloo and exiled to Saint Helena, an island in the South Atlantic Ocean.

After Napoleon's defeat, the Congress of Vienna was held to determine new national borders. The Concert of Europe attempted to preserve this settlement was established to preserve these borders, with limited impact.

=== Latin American independence ===
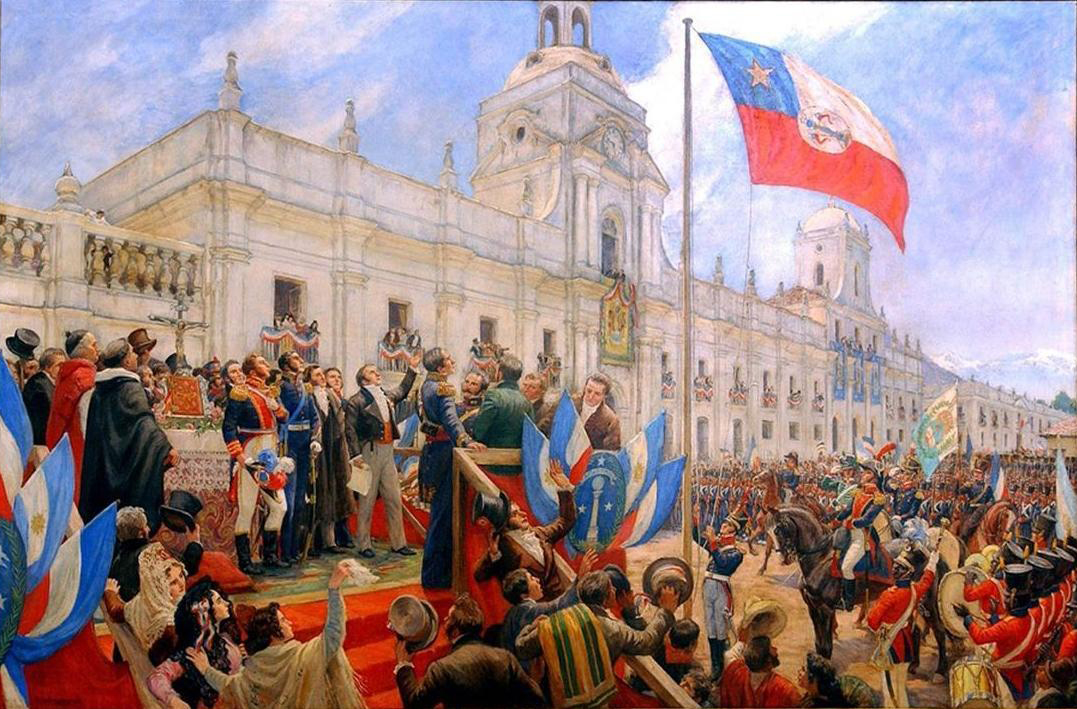
The Chilean Declaration of Independence, 18 February 1818

Mexico and the majority of the countries in Central America and South America obtained independence from colonial overlords during the 19th century. In 1804, Haiti gained independence from France. In Mexico, the Mexican War of Independence was a decade-long conflict that ended in Mexican independence in 1821.

Due to the Napoleonic Wars, the royal family of Portugal relocated to Brazil from 1808 to 1821, leading to Brazil having a separate monarchy from Portugal.

The Federal Republic of Central America gained independence from Spain in 1821 and from Mexico in 1823. After several rebellions, by 1841 the federation had dissolved into the independent countries of Guatemala, El Salvador, Honduras, Nicaragua, and Costa Rica.

In 1830, the post-colonial nation of Gran Colombia dissolved and the nations of Colombia (including modern-day Panama), Ecuador, and Venezuela took its place.

=== Revolutions of 1848 ===
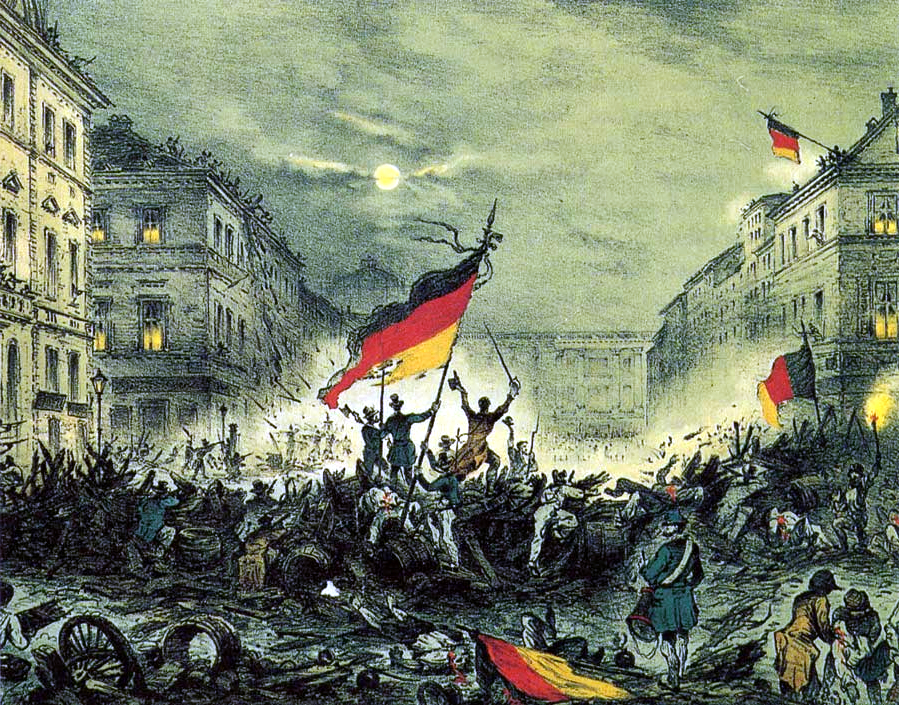
Liberal and nationalist pressure led to the European revolutions of 1848.

The Revolutions of 1848 were a series of political upheavals throughout Europe in 1848. The revolutions were essentially democratic and liberal in nature, with the aim of removing the old monarchical structures and creating independent nation states.

The first revolution began in January in Sicily. Revolutions then spread across Europe after a separate revolution began in France in February. Over 50 countries were affected, but with no coordination or cooperation among their respective revolutionaries.

According to Evans and von Strandmann (2000), some of the major contributing factors were widespread dissatisfaction with political leadership, demands for more participation in government and democracy, demands for freedom of the press, other demands made by the working class, the upsurge of nationalism, and the regrouping of established government forces.

=== Abolition and the American Civil War ===
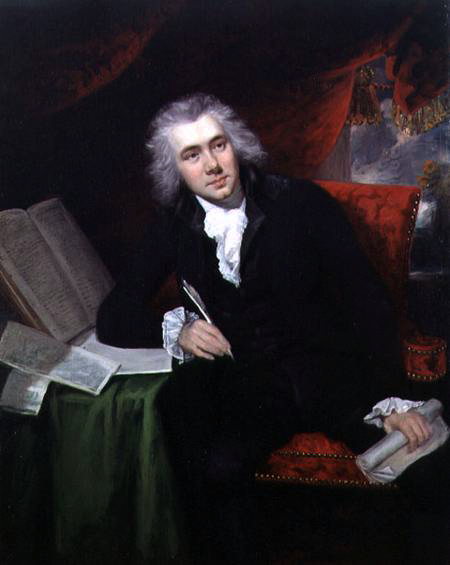
Politician and philanthropist William Wilberforce (1759–1833) was a leader of the movement to abolish the slave trade.

The abolitionism movement achieved success in the 19th century. The Atlantic slave trade was abolished in the United States in 1808, and by the end of the century, almost every government had banned slavery. The Slavery Abolition Act 1833 banned slavery throughout the British Empire, and the Lei Áurea abolished slavery in Brazil in 1888.

Abolitionism in the United States continued until the end of the American Civil War. Frederick Douglass and Harriet Tubman were two of many American abolitionists who helped win the fight against slavery. Douglass was an articulate orator and incisive antislavery writer, while Tubman worked with a network of antislavery activists and safe houses known as the Underground Railroad.

The American Civil War took place from 1861 to 1865. Eleven southern states seceded from the United States, largely over concerns related to slavery. In 1863, President Abraham Lincoln issued the Emancipation Proclamation. Lincoln issued a preliminary on September 22, 1862, warning that in all states still in rebellion (Confederacy) on January 1, 1863, he would declare their slaves "then, thenceforward, and forever free." He did so. The Thirteenth Amendment to the Constitution, ratified in 1865, officially abolished slavery in the entire country.

Five days after Robert E. Lee surrendered at Appomattox Courthouse, Virginia, Lincoln was assassinated by actor and Confederate sympathizer John Wilkes Booth.

=== Decline of the Ottoman Empire ===
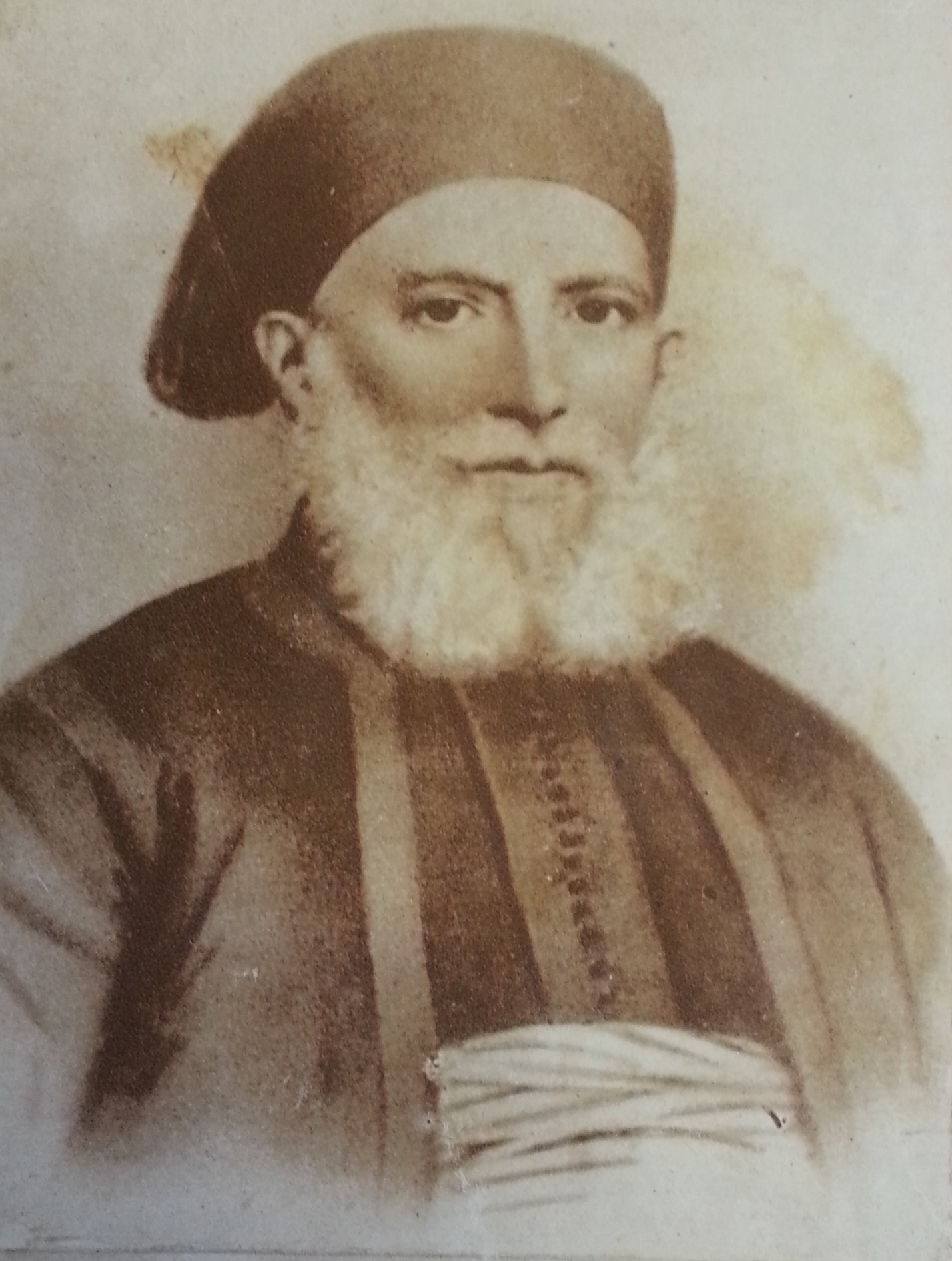
Ibrahim Pasha of Egypt, leader of the Egyptian Army in the Egyptian–Ottoman War (1831–1833)

In 1817, the Principality of Serbia became suzerain from the Ottoman Empire, and in 1867, it passed a constitution that defined its independence from the Ottoman Empire. In 1830, Greece became the first country to break away from the Ottoman Empire after the Greek War of Independence. In 1831, the Bosnian Uprising against Ottoman rule occurred. In 1831, The First Egyptian–Ottoman War (1831–1833) occurred, between the Ottoman Empire and Egypt brought about by Muhammad Ali Pasha's demand to the Sublime Porte for control of Greater Syria, as reward for aiding the Sultan during the Greek War of Independence. As a result, Egyptian forces temporarily gained control of Syria, advancing as far north as Kütahya. In 1876, Bulgarians instigated the April Uprising against Ottoman rule. Following the Russo-Turkish War, the Treaty of Berlin recognized the formal independence of Serbia, Montenegro, and Romania. Bulgaria became autonomous.

=== China: Taiping Rebellion ===
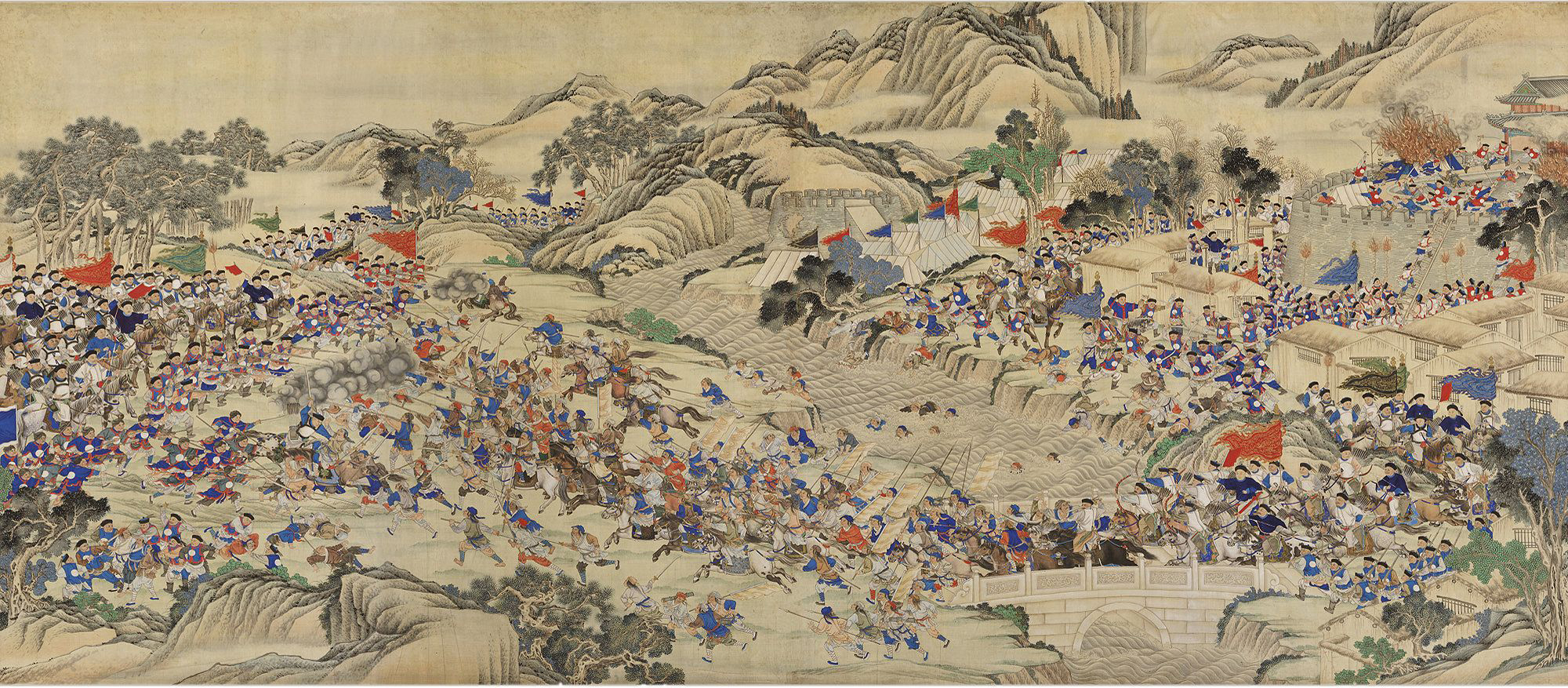
A scene of the Taiping Rebellion

The Taiping Rebellion was the bloodiest conflict of the 19th century, leading to the deaths of around 20–30 million people. Its leader, Hong Xiuquan, declared himself the younger brother of Jesus Christ and developed a new Chinese religion known as the God Worshipping Society. After proclaiming the establishment of the Taiping Heavenly Kingdom in 1851, the Taiping army conquered a large part of China, capturing Nanjing in 1853. In 1864, after the death of Hong Xiuquan, Qing forces recaptured Nanjing and ended the rebellion.

=== Japan: Meiji Restoration ===
During the Edo period, Japan largely pursued an isolationist foreign policy. In 1853, United States Navy Commodore Matthew C. Perry threatened the Japanese capital Edo with gunships, demanding that they agree to open trade. This led to the opening of trade relations between Japan and foreign countries, with the policy of Sakoku formally ended in 1854.

By 1872, the Japanese government under Emperor Meiji had eliminated the daimyō system and established a strong central government. Further reforms included the abolition of the samurai class, rapid industrialization and modernization of government, closely following European models.

=== Colonialism ===
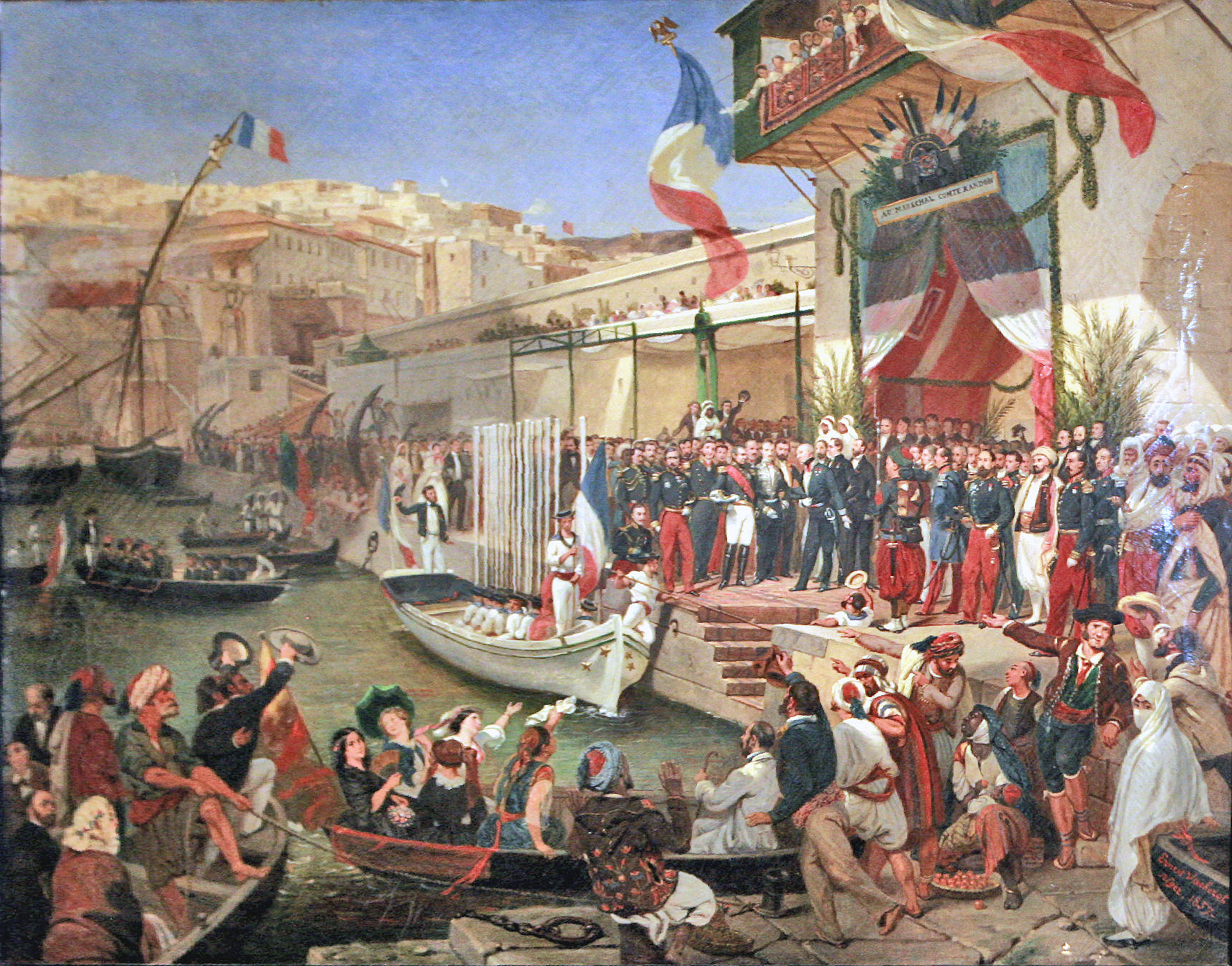
Arrival of Marshal Randon in Algiers, French Algeria in 1857

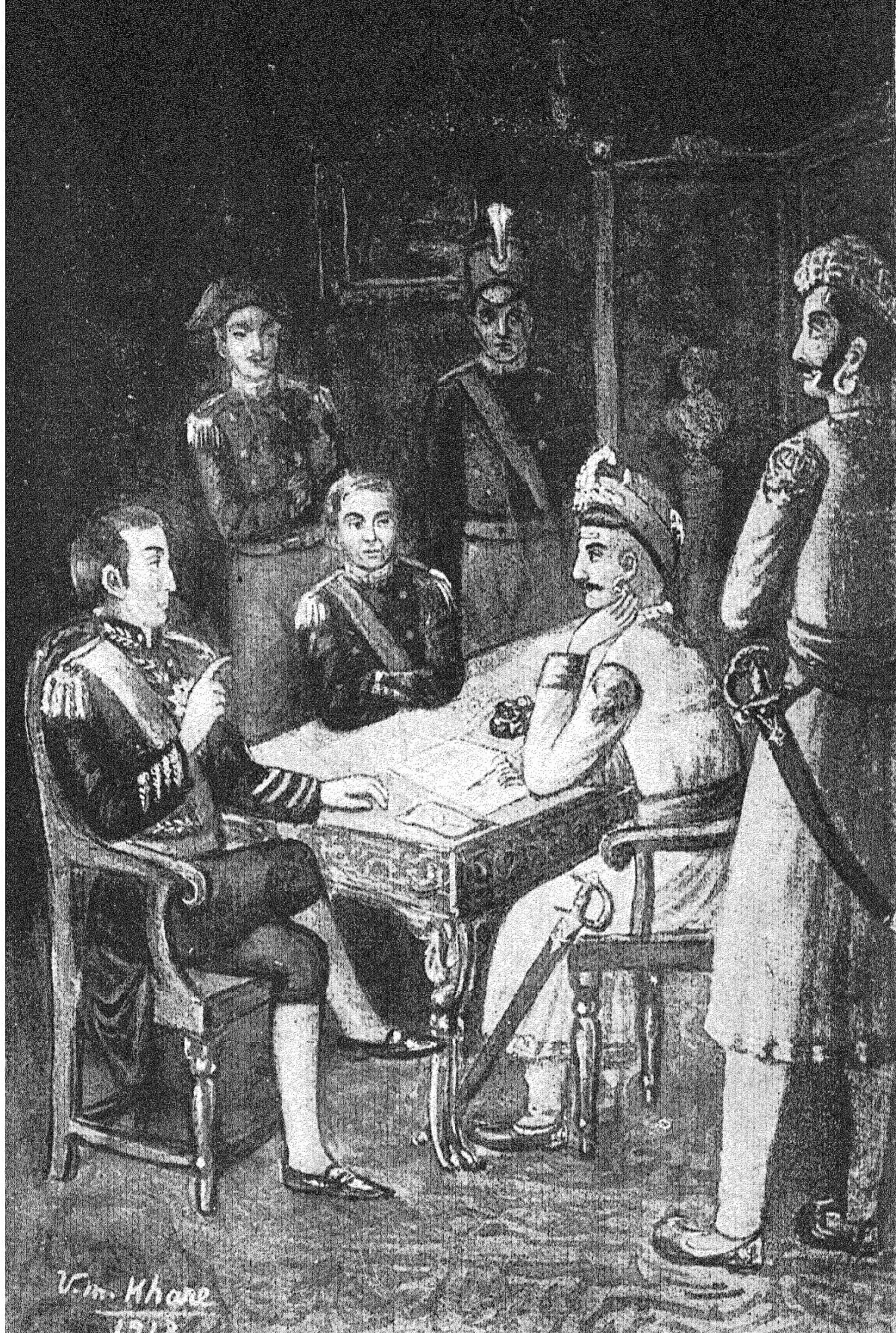
The Maratha Confederacy and the East India Company sign the Treaty of Bassein in 1802.

- 1803: United States more than doubles in size when it buys out France's territorial claims in North America via the Louisiana Purchase. This begins the U.S.'s westward expansion to the Pacific, referred to as its Manifest Destiny, which involves annexing and conquering land from Mexico, Britain, and Native Americans.
- 1817 – 1819: British Empire annexed the Maratha Confederacy after the Third Anglo-Maratha War.
- 1823 – 1887: British Empire annexed Burma (now also called Myanmar) after three Anglo-Burmese Wars.
- 1848 – 1849: Sikh Empire is defeated in the Second Anglo-Sikh War. Therefore, the entire Indian subcontinent is under British control.
- 1862: France gained its first foothold in Southeast Asia and in 1863 annexed Cambodia.
- 1867: United States purchased Alaska from Russia.

==== Africa ====
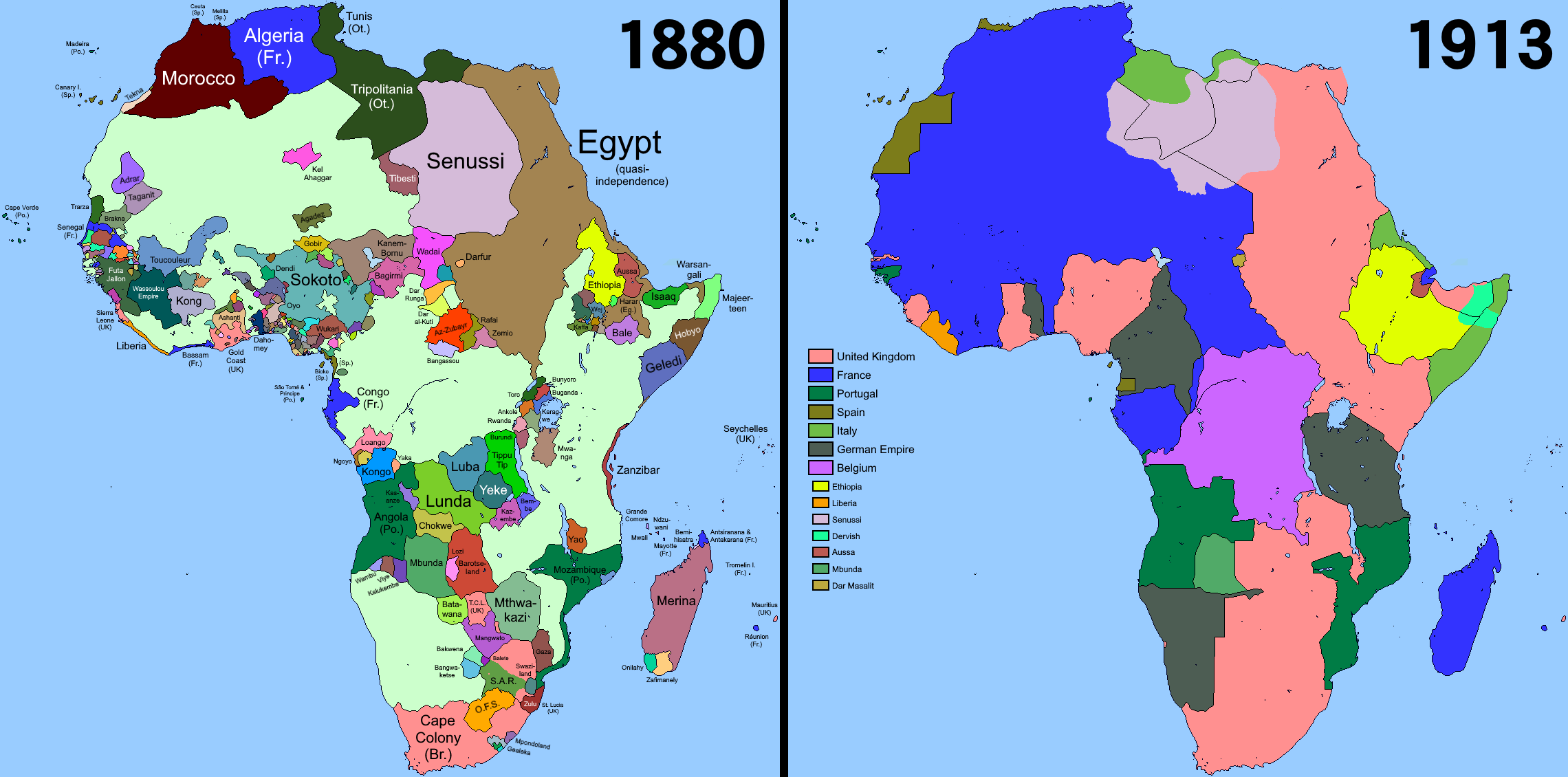
Comparison of Africa in the years 1880 and 1913

In Africa, European exploration and technology led to the colonization of almost the entire continent by 1898. New medicines such as quinine and more advanced firearms allowed European nations to conquer native populations.

Motivations for the Scramble for Africa included national pride, desire for raw materials, and Christian missionary activity. Britain seized control of Egypt to ensure control of the Suez Canal, but Ethiopia defeated Italy in the First Italo–Ethiopian War at the Battle of Adwa. France, Belgium, Portugal, and Germany also had substantial colonies. The Berlin Conference of 1884–1885 attempted to reach agreement on colonial borders in Africa, but disputes continued, both amongst European powers and in resistance by the native populations.

In 1867, diamonds were discovered in the Kimberley region of South Africa. In 1886, gold was discovered in Transvaal. This led to colonization in Southern Africa by the British and business interests, led by Cecil Rhodes.

=== Other wars ===
- 1801–1815: First Barbary War and the Second Barbary War between the United States and the Barbary States of North Africa.
- 1802: Tay Son army recaptured Phu Xuan, causing Vo Tanh to commit suicide, Nguyen Phuc Anh successfully captured Thang Long, founded the Nguyen dynasty
- 1804–1810: Fulani Jihad in Nigeria.
- 1804–1813: Russo-Persian War.
- 1806–1812: Russo-Turkish War, Treaty of Bucharest.
- 1807–1837: Musket Wars among Māori in many parts of New Zealand.
- 1808–1809: Russia conquers Finland from Sweden in the Finnish War.
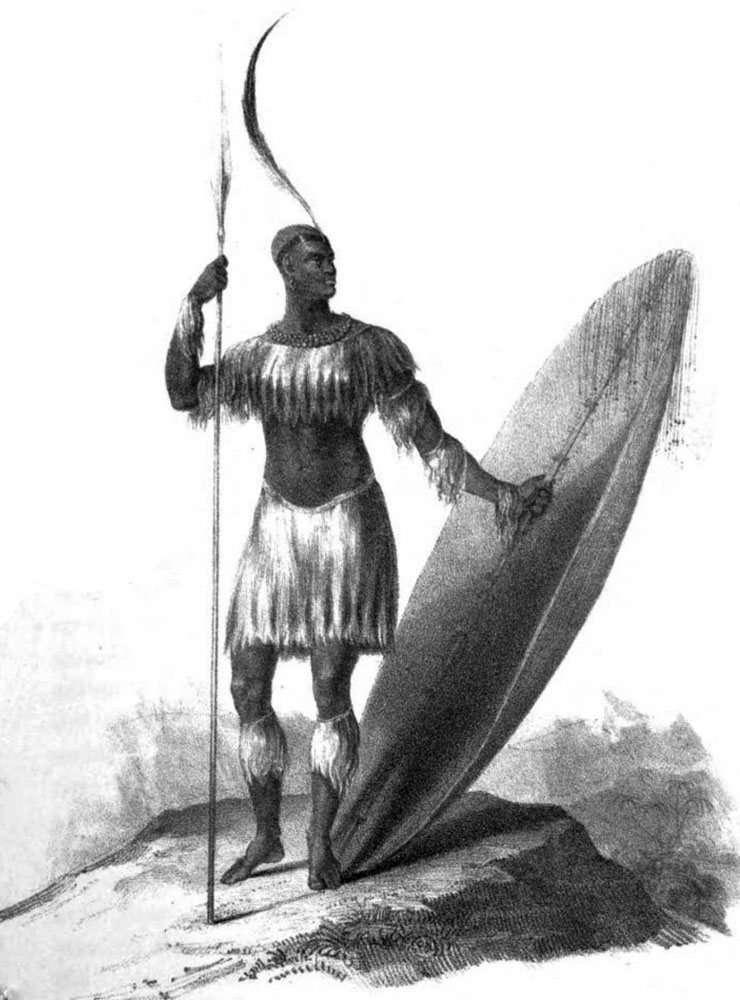
  1816: Shaka rises to power over the Zulu Kingdom. Zulu expansion was a major factor of the Mfecane ("Crushing") that depopulated large areas of southern Africa.
- 1810: Grito de Dolores begins the Mexican War of Independence.
- 1811: Battle of Tippecanoe: U.S. outnumbering Native Americans resulting in defeat and burning of community
- 1812–1815: War of 1812 between the United States and Britain; ends in a draw, except that Native Americans lose power.
- 1813–1837: Afghan–Sikh Wars.
- 1814–1816: Anglo-Nepalese War between Nepal (Gurkha Empire) and British Empire.
- 1817: First Seminole War begins in Florida.
- 1817: Russia commences its conquest of the Caucasus.
- 1820: Revolutions of 1820 in Southern Europe
- 1821–1830: Greek War of Independence against the Ottoman Empire.
- 1825–1830: Java War begins.
- 1826–1828: After the final Russo-Persian War, the Persian Empire took back territory lost to Russia from the previous war.
- 1828–1832: Black War in Tasmania leads to the near extinction of the Tasmanian aborigines
- 1830: July Revolution overthrew old line of Bourbons.
- 1830: November Uprising in Poland against Russia.
- 1830: Belgian Revolution results in Belgium's independence from Netherlands.
- 1830: End of the Java War. The whole area of Yogyakarta and Surakarta Manca nagara Dutch seized. 27 September, Klaten Agreement determines a fixed boundary between Surakarta and Yogyakarta and permanently divide the kingdom of Mataram was signed by Sasradiningrat, Pepatih Dalem Surakarta, and Danurejo, Pepatih Dalem Yogyakarta. Mataram is a de facto and de yure controlled by the Dutch East Indies.
- 1831: France invades and occupies Algeria.
- 1831–1833: Egyptian–Ottoman War.
- 1832–1875: Regimental rebellions of Brazil
- 1835–1836: Texas Revolution results in Texas's independence from Mexico.
- 1839–1842: First Opium War begins.
- 1846–1848: Mexican–American War leads to Mexico's cession of much of the modern-day Southwestern United States.
- 1848: February Revolution overthrew Louis Philippe's government. Second Republic proclaimed; Louis Napoleon, nephew of Napoleon I, elected president.
- 1853–1856: Crimean War between France, the United Kingdom, the Ottoman Empire and Russia.
- 1856–1860: Second Opium War
- 1857: Indian Rebellion against the Company Raj. After this the power of the East India Company is transferred to the British Crown.
- 1859: Franco-Austrian War is part of the wars of Italian unification.
- 1861–1865: American Civil War between the Union and seceding Confederacy.
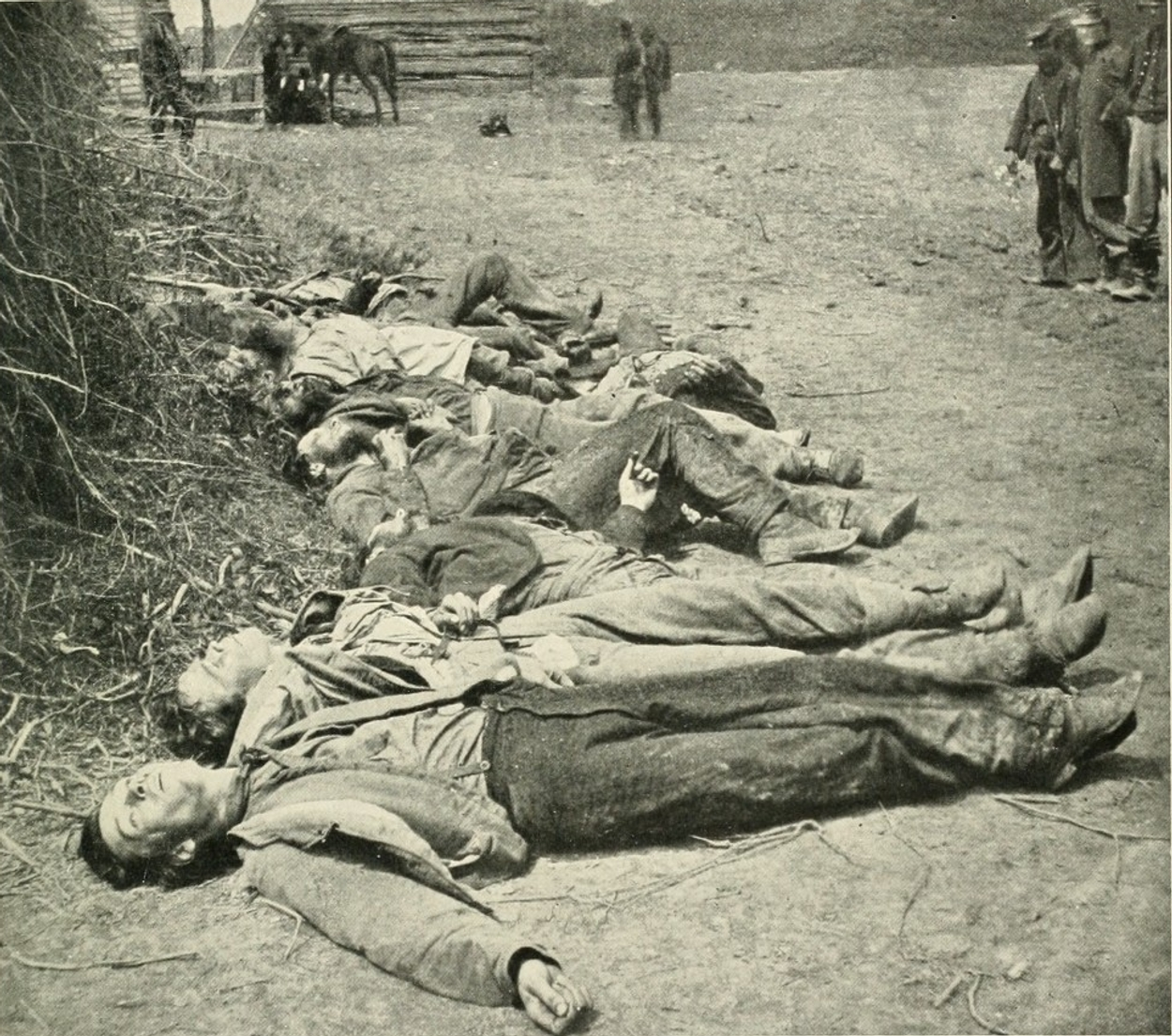
  Dead Confederate soldiers. In the American Civil War, 30% of all Southern white males aged 18–40 were killed.
- 1861–1867: French intervention in Mexico and the creation of the Second Mexican Empire, ruled by Maximilian I of Mexico and his consort Carlota of Mexico.
- 1863–1865: January Uprising against the Russian Empire.
- 1864–1870: Paraguayan War ends Paraguayan ambitions for expansion and destroys much of the Paraguayan population.
- 1866: Austro-Prussian War results in the dissolution of the German Confederation and the creation of the North German Confederation and the Austrian-Hungarian Dual Monarchy.
- 1868–1869: Boshin War results in end of the shogunate and the founding the Japanese Empire.
- 1868–1878: Ten Years' War between Cuba and Spain.
- 1870–1871: Franco-Prussian War results in the unifications of Germany and Italy, the collapse of the Second French Empire and the emergence of a New Imperialism.
- 1870: Napoleon III abdicated after unsuccessful conclusion of Franco-Prussian War. Third Republic proclaimed.
- 1876: The April Uprising in Bulgaria against the Ottoman Empire.
- 1879: Anglo-Zulu War results in British victory and the annexation of the Zulu Kingdom.
- 1879–1880: Little War against Spanish rule in Cuba leads to rebel defeat.
- 1879–1883: Chile battles with Peru and Bolivia over Andean territory in the War of the Pacific.
- 1880–1881: First Boer War begins.
- 1881–1899: Mahdist War in Sudan.
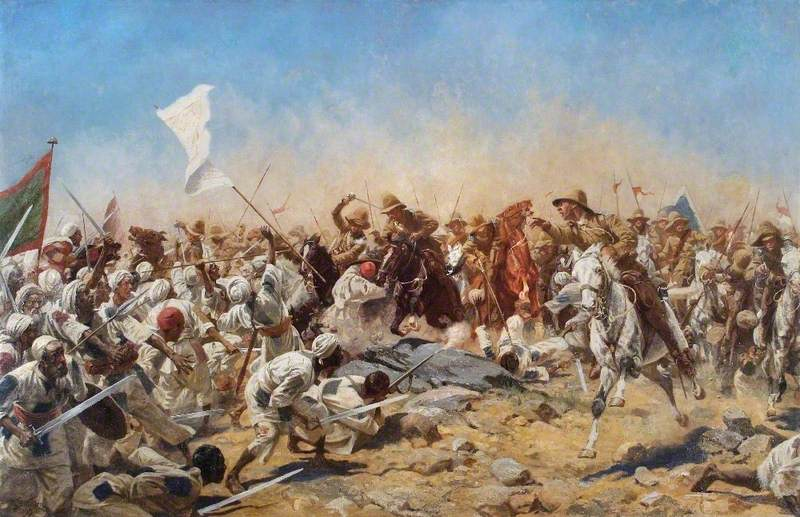
  A depiction of the Battle of Omdurman, 1898. During the battle, Winston Churchill took part in a cavalry charge.
- 1882: Anglo-Egyptian War British invasion and subsequent occupation of Egypt
- 1883–1898: Mandingo Wars between the French colonial empire and the Wassoulou Empire of the Mandingo people led by Samory Touré.
- 1894–1895: After the First Sino-Japanese War, China cedes Taiwan to Japan and grants Japan a free hand in Korea.
- 1895: Taiwan is ceded to the Empire of Japan as a result of the First Sino-Japanese War.
- 1895–1896: Ethiopia defeats Italy in the First Italo–Ethiopian War at the Battle of Adwa.
- 1895–1898: Cuban War for Independence results in Cuban independence from Spain.
- 1896–1898: Philippine Revolution results in a Filipino victory.
- 1898: Spanish–American War results in the independence of Cuba.
- 1899–1901: Boxer Rebellion in China is suppressed by the Eight-Nation Alliance.
- 1899–1902: Thousand Days' War in Colombia breaks out between the "Liberales" and "Conservadores", culminating with the loss of Panama in 1903.
- 1899–1902: Second Boer War begins.
- 1899–1902: Philippine–American War begins.

== Science and technology ==
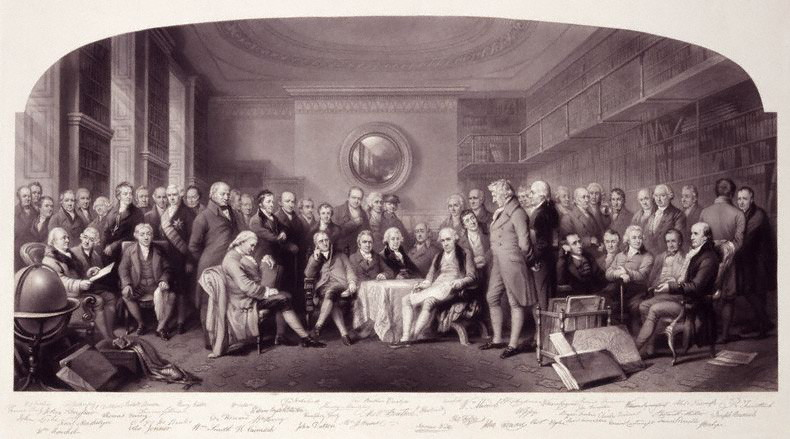
Distinguished Men of Science. Use the cursor to see who is who.

The 19th century saw the birth of science as a profession; the term scientist was coined in 1833 by William Whewell, which soon replaced the older term of natural philosopher. Among the most influential ideas of the 19th century were those of Charles Darwin (alongside the independent researches of Alfred Russel Wallace), who in 1859 published the book The Origin of Species, which introduced the idea of evolution by natural selection. Another important landmark in medicine and biology were the successful efforts to prove the germ theory of disease. Following this, Louis Pasteur made the first vaccine against rabies, and also made many discoveries in the field of chemistry, including the asymmetry of crystals. In chemistry, Dmitri Mendeleev, following the atomic theory of John Dalton, created the first periodic table of elements. In physics, the experiments, theories and discoveries of Michael Faraday, André-Marie Ampère, James Clerk Maxwell, and their contemporaries led to the creation of electromagnetism as a new branch of science. Thermodynamics led to an understanding of heat and the notion of energy was defined. Other highlights include the discoveries unveiling the nature of atomic structure and matter, simultaneously with chemistry – and of new kinds of radiation. In astronomy, the planet Neptune was discovered. In mathematics, the notion of complex numbers finally matured and led to a subsequent analytical theory; they also began the use of hypercomplex numbers. Karl Weierstrass and others carried out the arithmetization of analysis for functions of real and complex variables. It also saw rise to new progress in geometry beyond those classical theories of Euclid, after a period of nearly two thousand years. The mathematical science of logic likewise had revolutionary breakthroughs after a similarly long period of stagnation. But the most important step in science at this time were the ideas formulated by the creators of electrical science. Their work changed the face of physics and made possible for new technology to come about including a rapid spread in the use of electric illumination and power in the last two decades of the century and radio wave communication at the end of the 1890s.

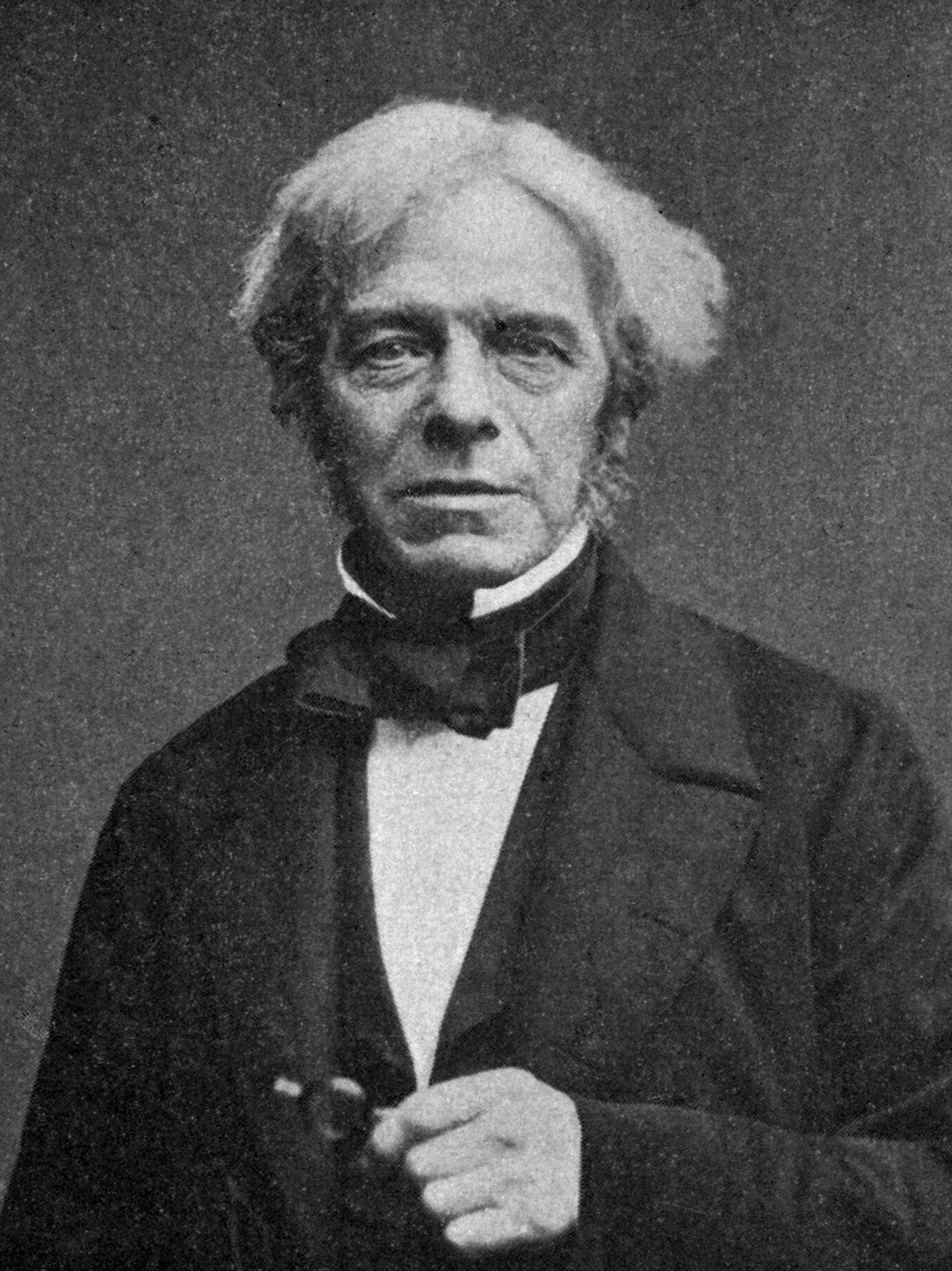
Michael Faraday (1791–1867)

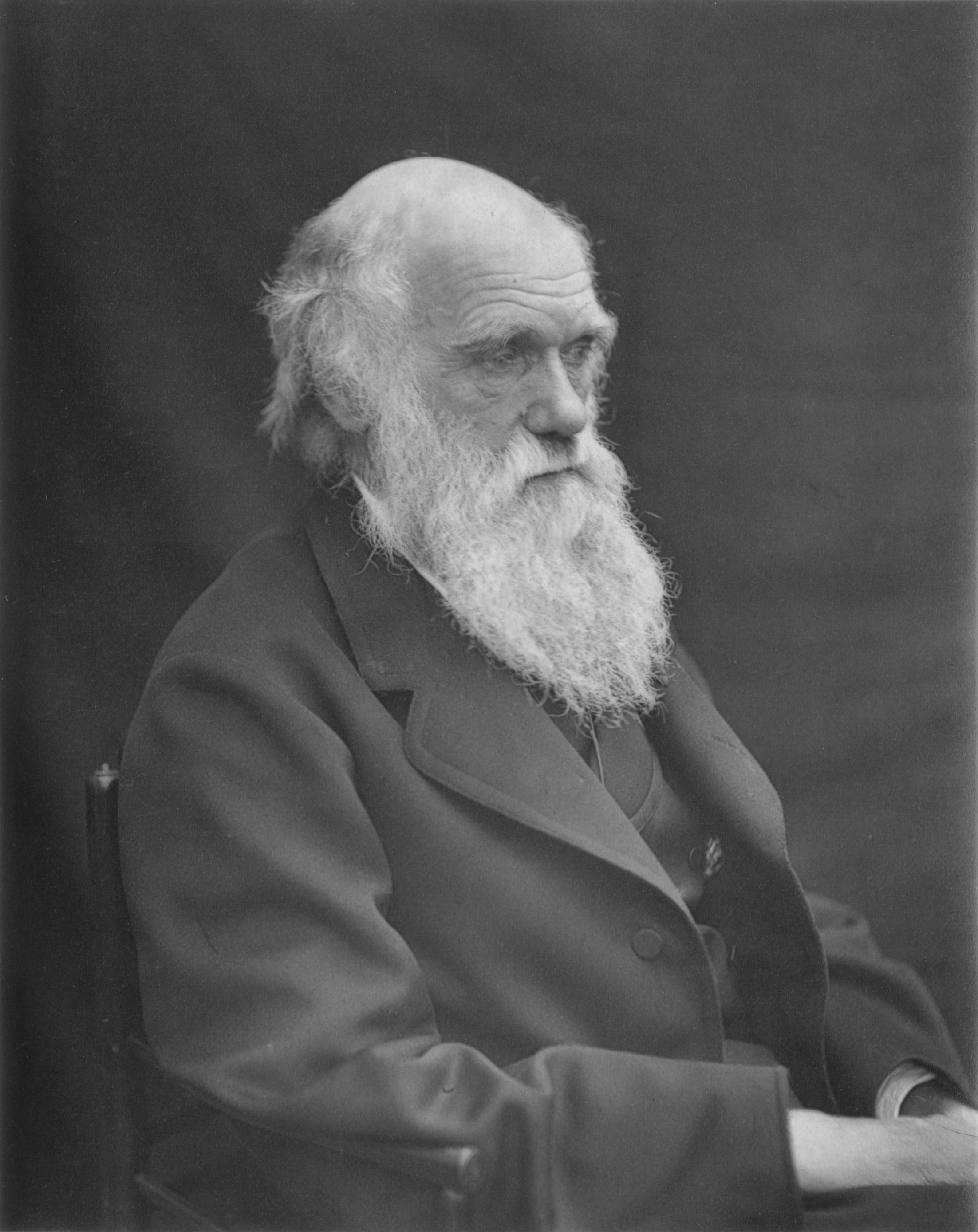
Charles Darwin (1809–1882)

- 1807: Potassium and Sodium are individually isolated by Sir Humphry Davy.
- 1831–1836: Charles Darwin's journey on HMS Beagle.
- 1859: Charles Darwin publishes On the Origin of Species.
- 1861: James Clerk Maxwell publishes On Physical Lines of Force, formulating the four Maxwell's equations.
- 1865: Gregor Mendel formulates his laws of inheritance.
- 1869: Dmitri Mendeleev creates the Periodic table.
- 1873: Maxwell's A Treatise on Electricity and Magnetism published.
- 1877: Asaph Hall discovers the moons of Mars
- 1896: Henri Becquerel discovers radioactivity; J. J. Thomson identifies the electron, though not by name.

=== Medicine ===
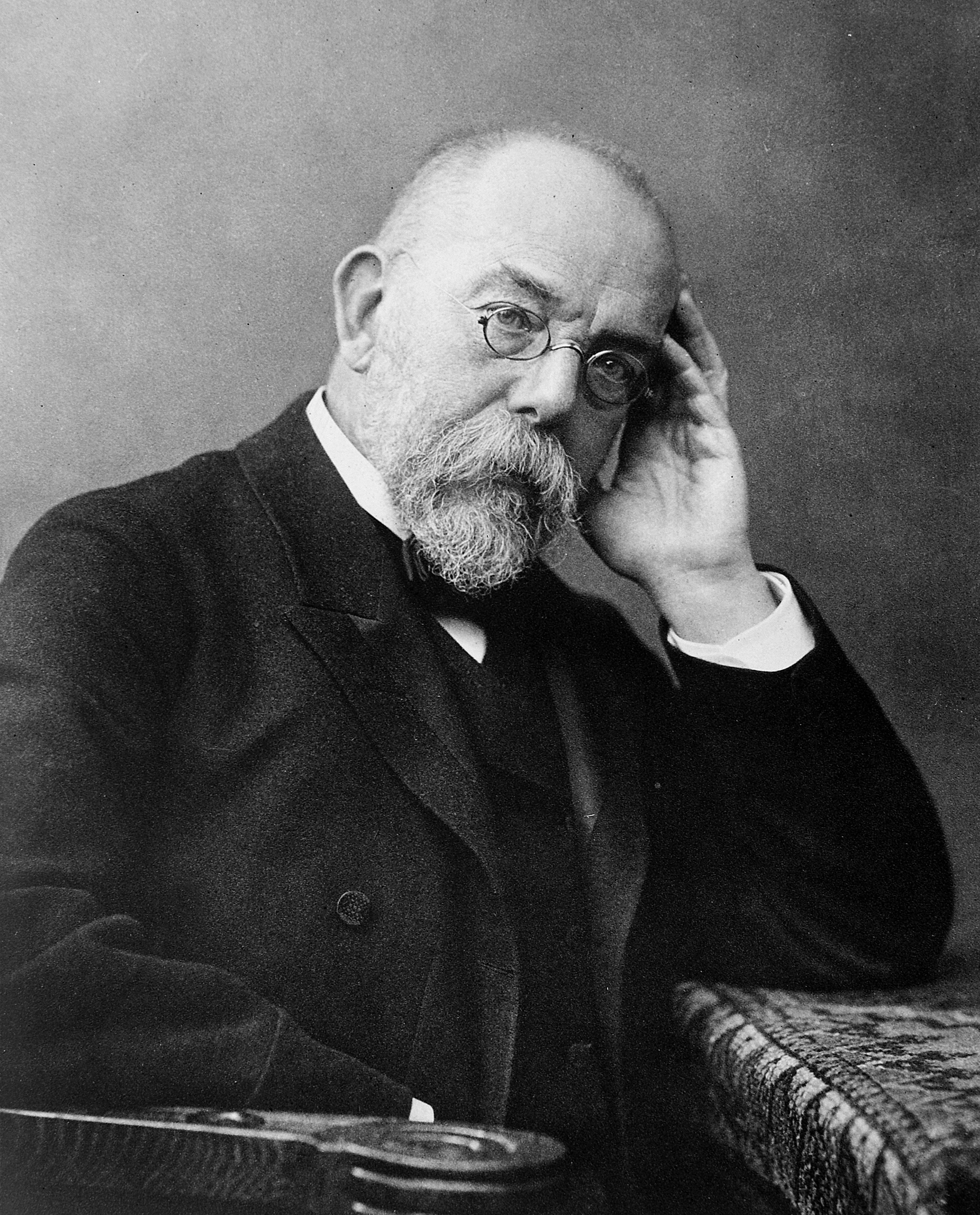
Robert Koch discovered the tuberculosis bacilli. In the 19th century, the disease killed an estimated 25% of the adult population of Europe.

- 1804: Morphine first isolated.
- 1842: Anesthesia used for the first time.
- 1847: Chloroform invented for the first time, given to Queen Victoria at the birth of her eighth child, Prince Leopold in 1853
- 1855: Cocaine is isolated by Friedrich Gaedcke.
- 1885: Louis Pasteur creates the first successful vaccine against rabies for a young boy who had been bitten 14 times by a rabid dog.
- 1889: Aspirin patented.

=== Inventions ===
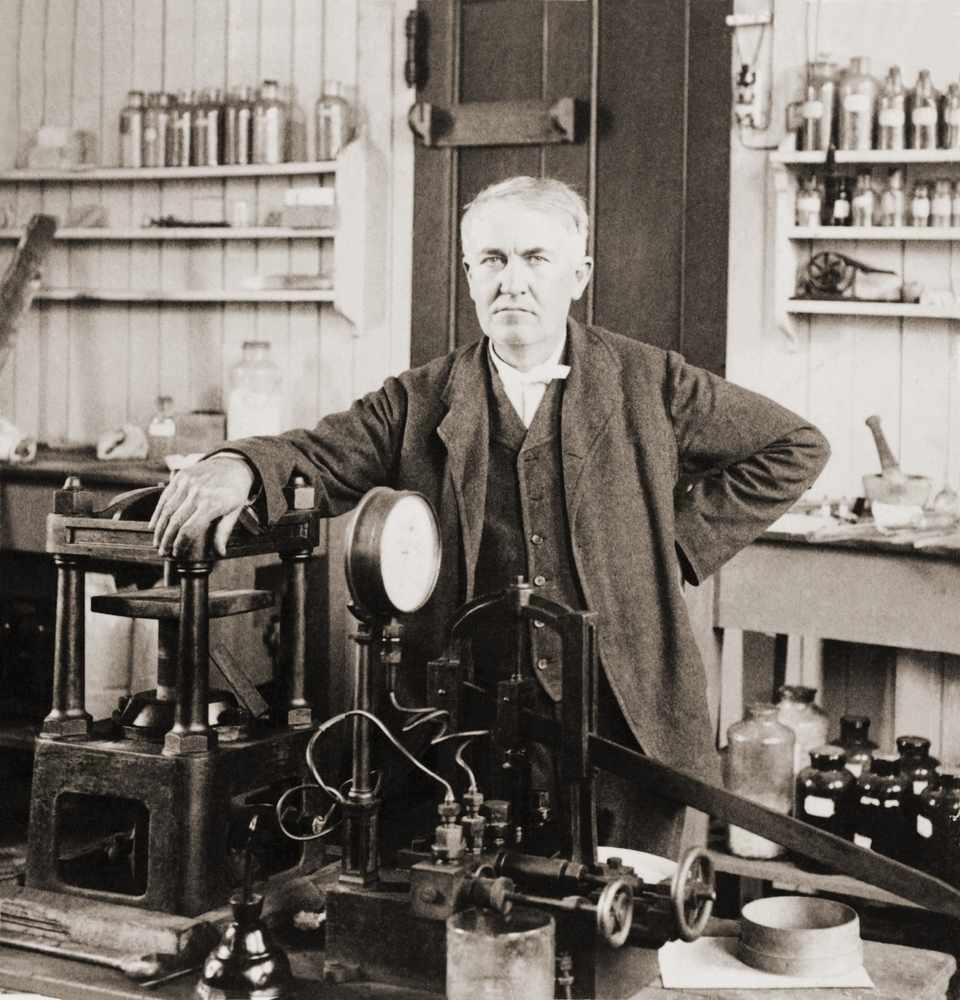
Thomas Edison was an American inventor, scientist, and businessman who developed many devices that greatly influenced life around the world, including the motion picture camera, phonograph and long-lasting, practical electric light bulb.

Built for the Netphener bus company in 1895, the Benz Omnibus was the first motor bus in history.

- 1804: First steam locomotive begins operation.
- 1816: Laufmaschine invented by Karl von Drais.
- 1825: Erie Canal opened connecting the Great Lakes to the Atlantic Ocean.
- 1825: First isolation of aluminium.
- 1827: First photograph taken (technique of heliography) by Joseph Nicephore Niepce.
- 1825: The Stockton and Darlington Railway, the first public railway in the world, is opened.
- 1826: Samuel Morey patents the internal combustion engine.
- 1829: First electric motor built.
- 1837: Telegraphy patented.
- 1841: The word "dinosaur" is coined by Richard Owen.
- 1844: First publicly funded telegraph line in the world—between Baltimore and Washington—sends demonstration message on 24 May, ushering in the age of the telegraph. This message read "What hath God wrought?" (Bible, Numbers 23:23)
- 1849: The safety pin and the gas mask are invented.
- 1852: The first successful blimp is invented
- 1855: Bessemer process enables steel to be mass-produced.
- 1856: World's first oil refinery in Romania
- 1858: Invention of the phonautograph, the first true device for recording sound.
- 1859: The first ironclad was launched into sea by the French Navy.
- 1860: Benjamin Tyler Henry invents the 16-shot Henry Rifle
- 1861: Richard Gatling invents the Gatling Gun, first modern machine gun used notably in the battles of Cold Harbor and Petersburg
- 1862: First meeting in combat of ironclad warships, USS Monitor and CSS Virginia, during the American Civil War.
- 1863: First section of the London Underground opens.
- 1866: Successful transatlantic telegraph cable follows an earlier attempt in 1858.
- 1867: Alfred Nobel invents dynamite.
- 1868: Safety bicycle invented.
- 1869: First transcontinental railroad completed in United States on 10 May.
- 1870: Rasmus Malling-Hansen's invention the Hansen Writing Ball becomes the first commercially sold typewriter.
- 1873: Blue jeans and barbed wire are invented.
- 1877: Thomas Edison invents the phonograph
- 1878: First commercial telephone exchange in New Haven, Connecticut.
- c. 1875/1880: Introduction of the widespread use of electric lighting. These included early crude systems in France and the UK and the introduction of large scale outdoor arc lighting systems by 1880.
- 1879: Thomas Edison patents a practical incandescent light bulb.
- 1882: Introduction of large scale electric power utilities with the Edison Holborn Viaduct (London) and Pearl Street (New York) power stations supplying indoor electric lighting using Edison's incandescent bulb.
- 1884: Sir Hiram Maxim invents the first self-powered Machine gun, the Maxim gun.
- 1885: Singer begins production of the 'Vibrating Shuttle'. which would become the most popular model of sewing machine.
- 1886: Karl Benz sells the first commercial automobile.
- 1890: The cardboard box is invented.
- 1892: John Froelich develops and constructs the first gasoline/petrol-powered tractor.
- 1894: Karl Elsener invents the Swiss Army knife.
- 1894: First gramophone record.
- 1895: Wilhelm Röntgen identifies x-rays.

== Religion ==
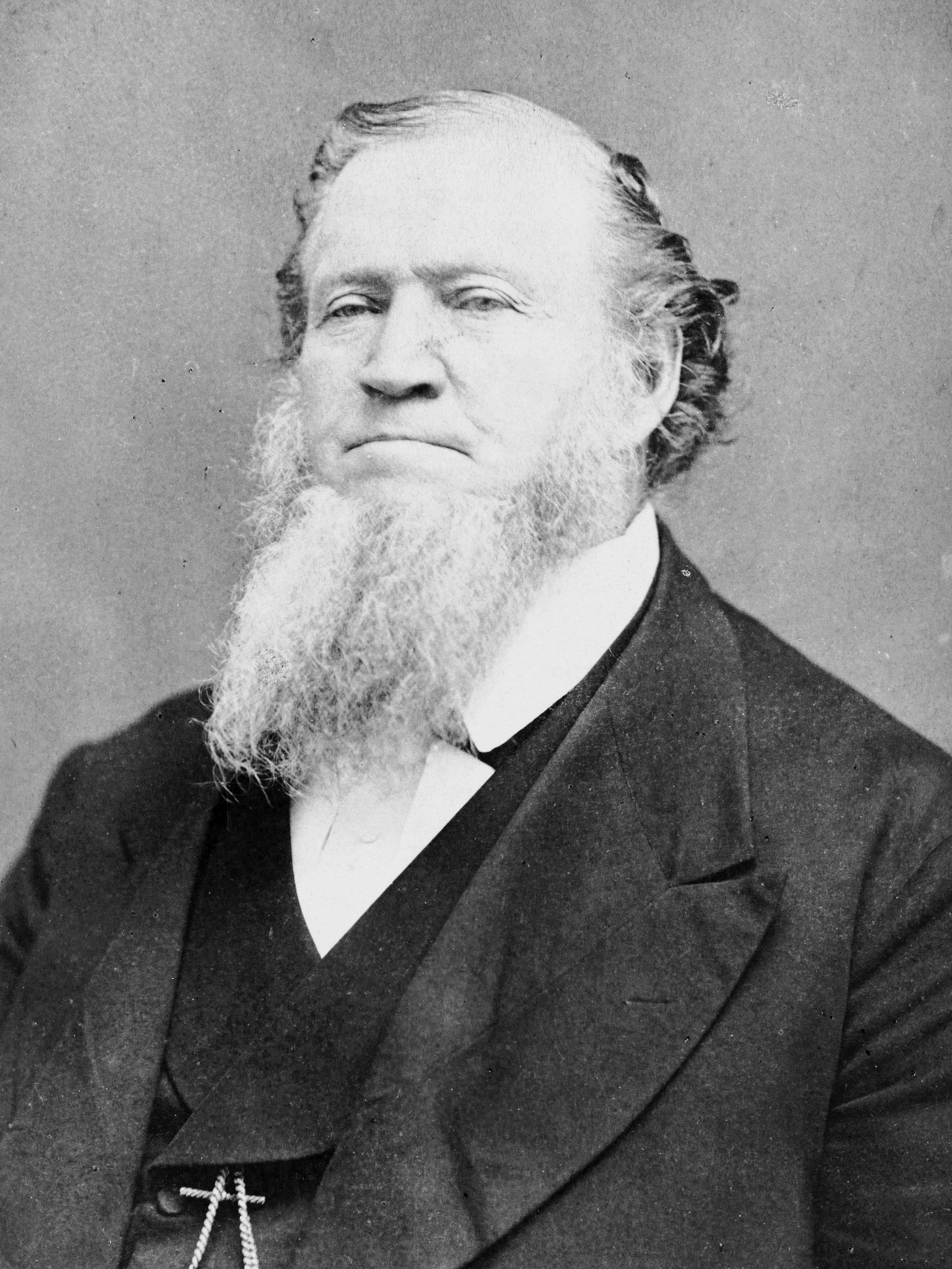
Brigham Young led the LDS Church from 1844 until his death in 1877.

- 1818: The first permanent Reform Judaism congregation, the Neuer Israelitischer Tempel, is founded in Hamburg on October 18. Around the same time, through the development of Wissenschaft des Judentums, the seeds of Conservative Judaism are sown.
- 1830: The Church of Jesus Christ of Latter Day Saints is established.
- 1844: The Báb announces his revelation on 23 May, founding Bábism. He announced to the world of the coming of "He whom God shall make manifest". He is considered the forerunner of Bahá'u'lláh, the founder of the Baháʼí Faith.
- 1850s–1890s: In Islam, Salafism grows in popularity.
- 1851: Hong Xiuquan, the leader of the God Worshipping Society, founds the Taiping Heavenly Kingdom.
- 1857: In Paris, France, Allan Kardec, publishes The Spirits' Book and founds the Spiritism.
- 1868: In Japan, State Shinto is established amidst the Meiji Restoration.
- 1869–1870: The First Vatican Council is convened, articulating the dogma of papal infallibility and promoting a revival of scholastic theology.
- 1871–1878: In Germany, Otto von Bismarck challenges the Catholic Church in the Kulturkampf ("Culture War")
- 1875: Helena Blavatsky co-founds the Theosophical Society and becomes the leading articulator of Theosophy.
- 1879: Mary Baker Eddy founds the Church of Christ, Scientist. The Watchtower, published by the Jehovah's Witnesses, releases its first issue.
- 1881: In the Sudan, Muhammad Ahmad claims to be the Mahdi, founding the Mahdist State and declaring war on the Khedivate of Egypt.
- 1889: Mirza Ghulam Ahmad establishes the Ahmadiyya Muslim Community.
- 1891: Pope Leo XIII issues the papal encyclical Rerum novarum, the first major document informing modern Catholic social teaching.

== Culture ==
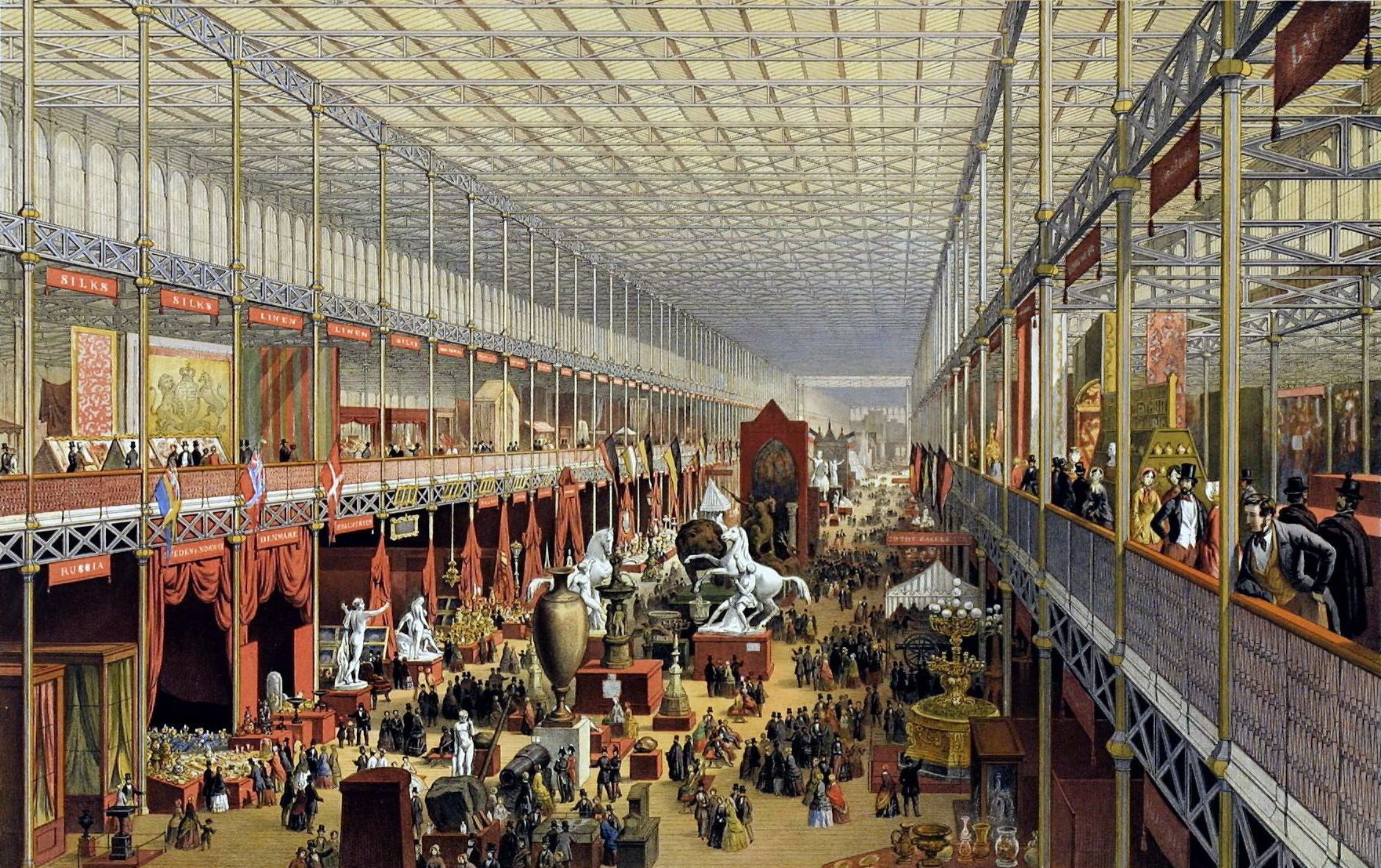
The Great Exhibition in London. Starting during the 18th century, the UK was the first country in the world to industrialize.

- 1808: Beethoven composes his Fifth Symphony
- 1813: Jane Austen publishes Pride and Prejudice
- 1818: Mary Shelley publishes Frankenstein; or, The Modern Prometheus.
- 1819: John Keats writes his six of his best-known odes.
- 1819: Théodore Géricault paints his masterpiece The Raft of the Medusa, and exhibits it in the French Salon of 1819 at the Louvre.
- 1824: Premiere of Beethoven's Ninth Symphony.
- 1829: Johann Wolfgang von Goethe's Faust premieres.
- 1833–1834: Thomas Carlyle publishes Sartor Resartus.
- 1837: Charles Dickens publishes Oliver Twist.
- 1841: Ralph Waldo Emerson publishes Self-Reliance.
- 1845: Frederick Douglass publishes Narrative of the Life of Frederick Douglass, an American Slave.
- 1847: The Brontë sisters publish Jane Eyre, Wuthering Heights and Agnes Grey.
- 1848: Karl Marx and Friedrich Engels publish The Communist Manifesto.
- 1849: Josiah Henson publishes The Life of Josiah Henson, Formerly a Slave, Now an Inhabitant of Canada, as Narrated by Himself.
- 1851: Herman Melville publishes Moby-Dick.
- 1851: Sojourner Truth delivers the speech "Ain't I a Woman?".
- 1852: Harriet Beecher Stowe publishes Uncle Tom's Cabin.
- 1855: Walt Whitman publishes the first edition of Leaves of Grass.
- 1855: Frederick Douglass publishes the first edition of My Bondage and My Freedom.
- 1862: Victor Hugo publishes Les Misérables.
- 1863: Jules Verne begins publishing his collection of stories and novels, Voyages extraordinaires, with the novel Cinq semaines en ballon.
- 1865: Lewis Carroll publishes Alice's Adventures in Wonderland.
- 1869: Leo Tolstoy publishes War and Peace.
  Auguste Renoir, Bal du moulin de la Galette, 1876, Musée d'Orsay
- 1875: Georges Bizet's opera Carmen premiers in Paris.
- 1876: Richard Wagner's Ring Cycle is first performed in its entirety.
- 1883: Robert Louis Stevenson's Treasure Island is published.
- 1884: Mark Twain publishes the Adventures of Huckleberry Finn.
- 1886: Strange Case of Dr Jekyll and Mr Hyde by Robert Louis Stevenson is published.
- 1887: Sir Arthur Conan Doyle publishes his first Sherlock Holmes story, A Study in Scarlet.
- 1889: Vincent van Gogh paints The Starry Night.
- 1889: Moulin Rouge opens in Paris.
- 1892: Tchaikovsky's Nutcracker Suite premières in St Petersburg.
- 1894: Rudyard Kipling's The Jungle Book is published
- 1895: Trial of Oscar Wilde and premiere of his play The Importance of Being Earnest.
- 1897: Bram Stoker writes Dracula.
- 1900: L. Frank Baum publishes The Wonderful Wizard of Oz.

=== Literature ===
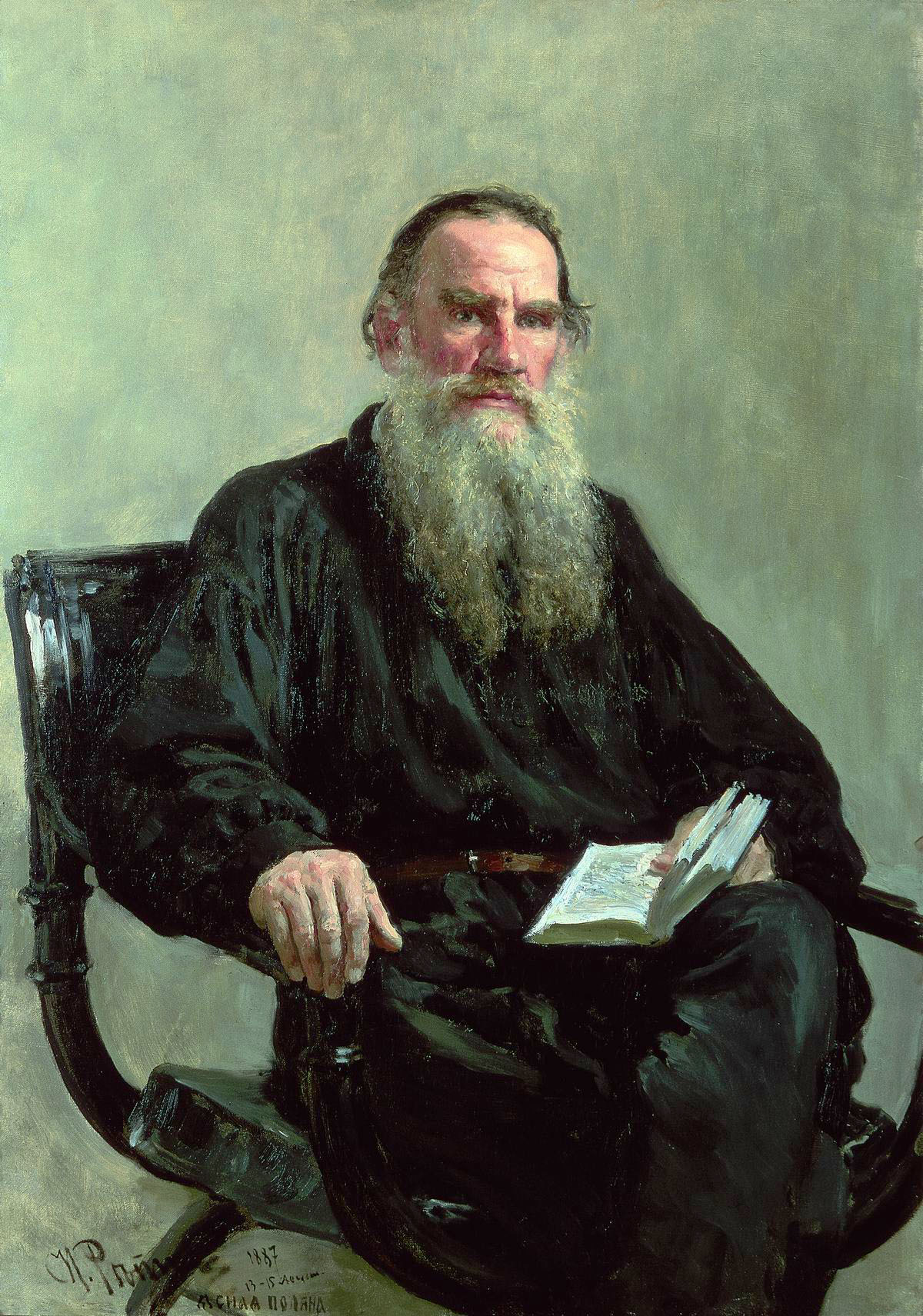
Russian writer Leo Tolstoy, author of War and Peace and Anna Karenina

On the literary front the new century opens with romanticism, a movement that spread throughout Europe in reaction to 18th-century rationalism, and it develops more or less along the lines of the Industrial Revolution, with a design to react against the dramatic changes wrought on nature by the steam engine and the railway. William Wordsworth and Samuel Taylor Coleridge are considered the initiators of the new school in England, while in the continent the German Sturm und Drang spreads its influence as far as Italy and Spain. French arts had been hampered by the Napoleonic Wars but subsequently developed rapidly. Modernism began.

The Goncourts and Émile Zola in France and Giovanni Verga in Italy produce some of the finest naturalist novels. Italian naturalist novels are especially important in that they give a social map of the new unified Italy to a people that until then had been scarcely aware of its ethnic and cultural diversity. There was a huge literary output during the 19th century. Some of the most famous writers included the Russians Alexander Pushkin, Nikolai Gogol, Leo Tolstoy, Anton Chekhov and Fyodor Dostoyevsky; the English Charles Dickens, John Keats, Alfred, Lord Tennyson and Jane Austen; the Scottish Sir Walter Scott, Thomas Carlyle and Arthur Conan Doyle (creator of the character Sherlock Holmes); the Irish Oscar Wilde; the Americans Edgar Allan Poe, Ralph Waldo Emerson, and Mark Twain; and the French Victor Hugo, Honoré de Balzac, Jules Verne, Alexandre Dumas and Charles Baudelaire.

Some American literary writers, poets and novelists were: Walt Whitman, Mark Twain, Harriet Ann Jacobs, Nathaniel Hawthorne, Ralph Waldo Emerson, Herman Melville, Frederick Douglass, Harriet Beecher Stowe, Joel Chandler Harris, and Emily Dickinson to name a few.

=== Photography ===
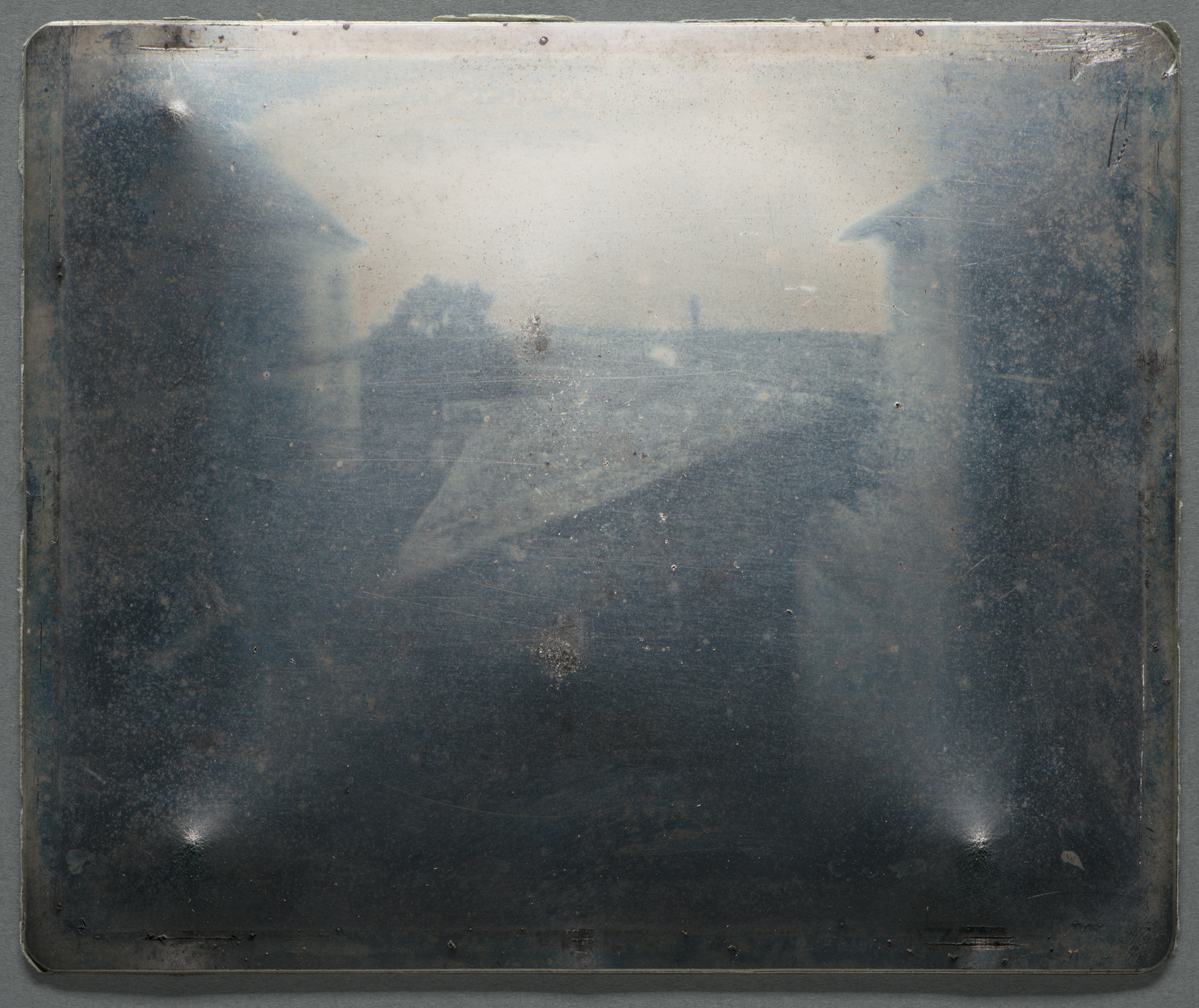
One of the first photographs, produced by Nicéphore Niépce in 1826

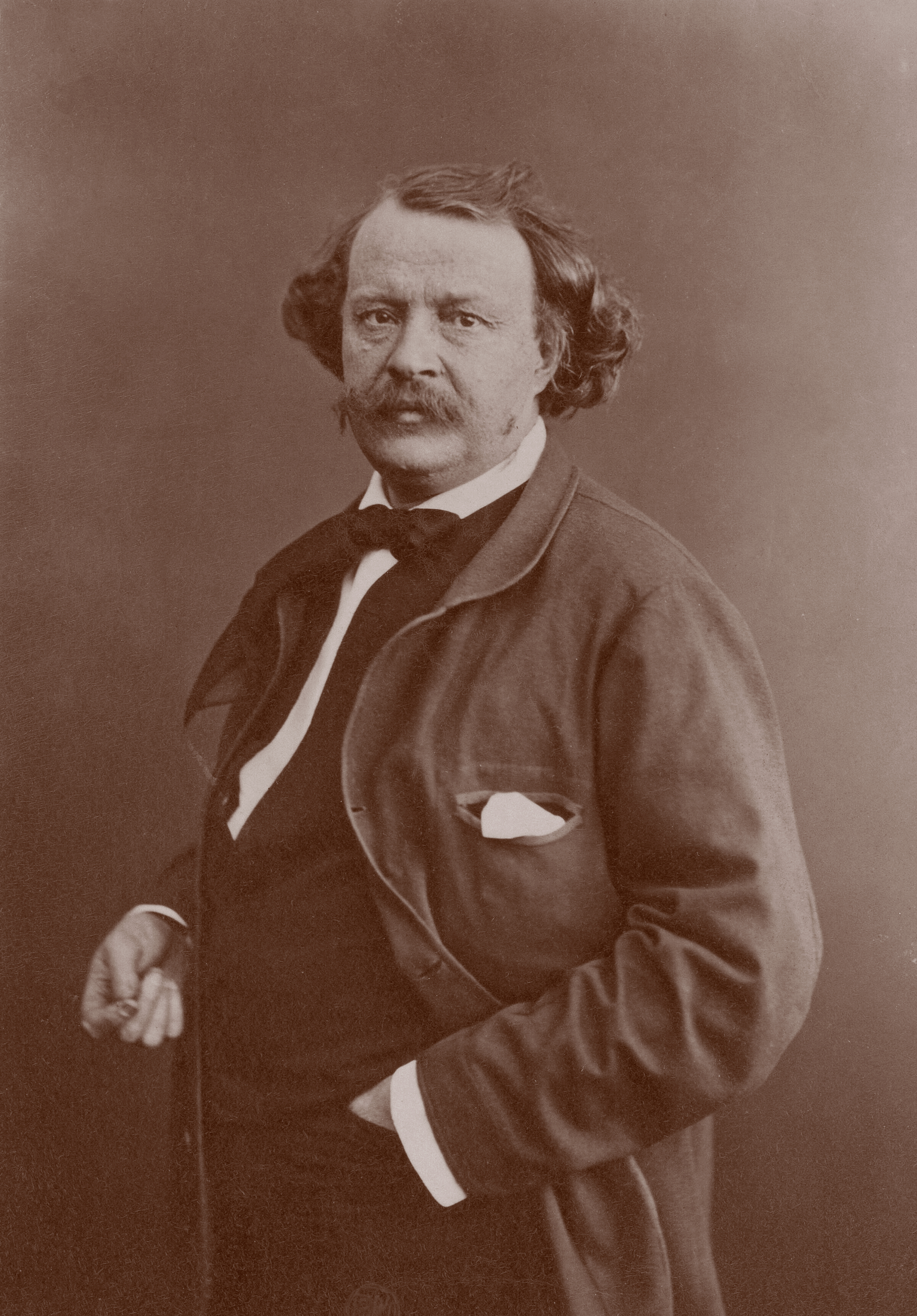
Nadar, self-portrait, c. 1860

- Ottomar Anschütz, chronophotographer
- Mathew Brady, documented the American Civil War
- Edward S. Curtis, documented the American West notably Native Americans
- Louis Daguerre, inventor of daguerreotype process of photography, chemist
- Thomas Eakins, pioneer motion photographer
- George Eastman, inventor of roll film
- Hércules Florence, pioneer inventor of photography
- Auguste and Louis Lumière, pioneer film-makers, inventors
- Étienne-Jules Marey, pioneer motion photographer, chronophotographer
- Eadweard Muybridge, pioneer motion photographer, chronophotographer
- Nadar a.k.a. Gaspard-Félix Tournachon, portrait photographer
- Nicéphore Niépce, pioneer inventor of photography
- Louis Le Prince, motion picture inventor and pioneer film-maker
- Sergey Prokudin-Gorsky, chemist and photographer
- William Fox Talbot, inventor of the negative / positive photographic process.

=== Visual artists, painters and sculptors ===
Francisco Goya, The Third of May 1808, 1814, Museo del Prado

Eugène Delacroix, Liberty Leading the People, 1830, Louvre

Vincent van Gogh, Self-portrait, 1889, National Gallery of Art

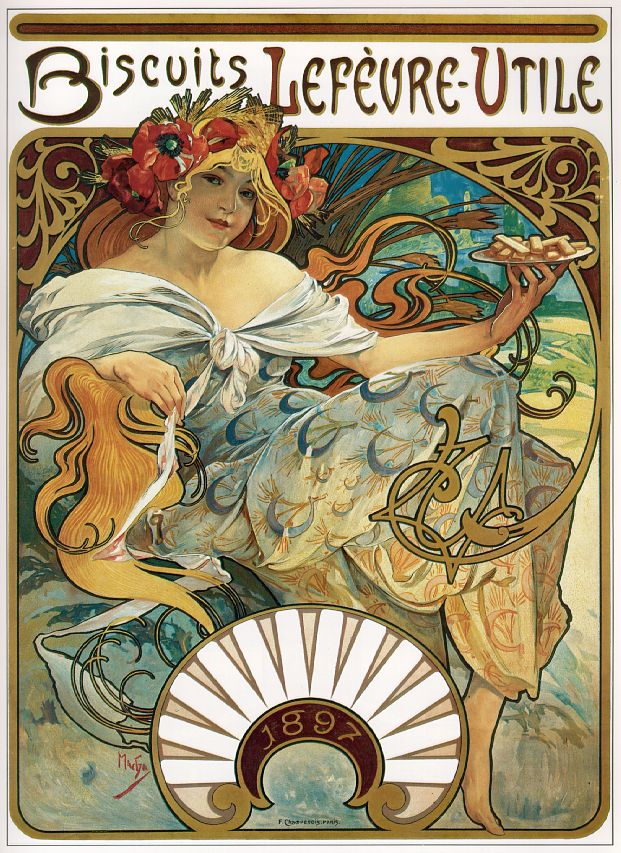
Biscuits Lefèvre-Utile poster artwork by Alphonse Mucha, 1897

The Realism and Romanticism of the early 19th century gave way to Impressionism and Post-Impressionism in the later half of the century, with Paris being the dominant art capital of the world. In the United States the Hudson River School was prominent. 19th-century painters included:

- Ivan Aivazovsky
- Léon Bakst
- Albert Bierstadt
- William Blake
- Arnold Böcklin
- Rosa Bonheur
- William Burges
- Mary Cassatt
- Camille Claudel
- Paul Cézanne
- Frederic Edwin Church
- Thomas Cole
- Jan Matejko
- John Constable
- Camille Corot
- Gustave Courbet
- Honoré Daumier
- Edgar Degas
- Eugène Delacroix
- Thomas Eakins
- Caspar David Friedrich
- Paul Gauguin
- Théodore Géricault
- Vincent van Gogh
- William Morris
- Francisco Goya
- Andō Hiroshige
- Hokusai
- Winslow Homer
- Jean-Auguste-Dominique Ingres
- Isaac Levitan
- Édouard Manet
- Claude Monet
- Gustave Moreau
- Berthe Morisot
- Edvard Munch
- Mikhail Nesterov
- Camille Pissarro
- Augustus Pugin
- Pierre-Auguste Renoir
- Ilya Repin
- Auguste Rodin
- Albert Pinkham Ryder
- John Singer Sargent
- Valentin Serov
- Georges Seurat
- Ivan Shishkin
- Vasily Surikov
- James Tissot
- Henri de Toulouse-Lautrec
- Joseph Mallord William Turner
- Viktor Vasnetsov
- Eugène Viollet-le-Duc
- Mikhail Vrubel
- James Abbott McNeill Whistler
- Tsukioka Yoshitoshi

=== Music ===
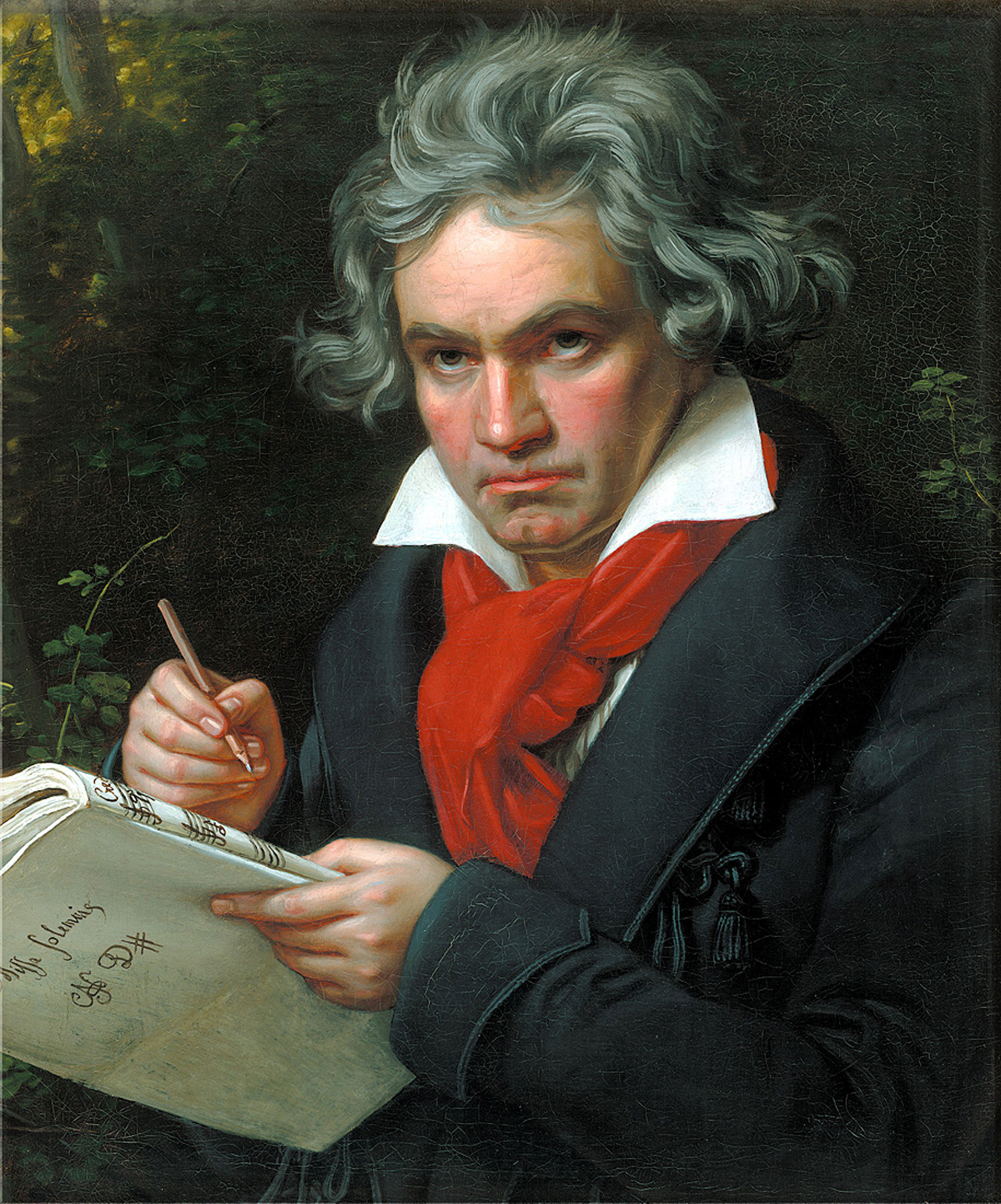
Ludwig van Beethoven (1770–1827)

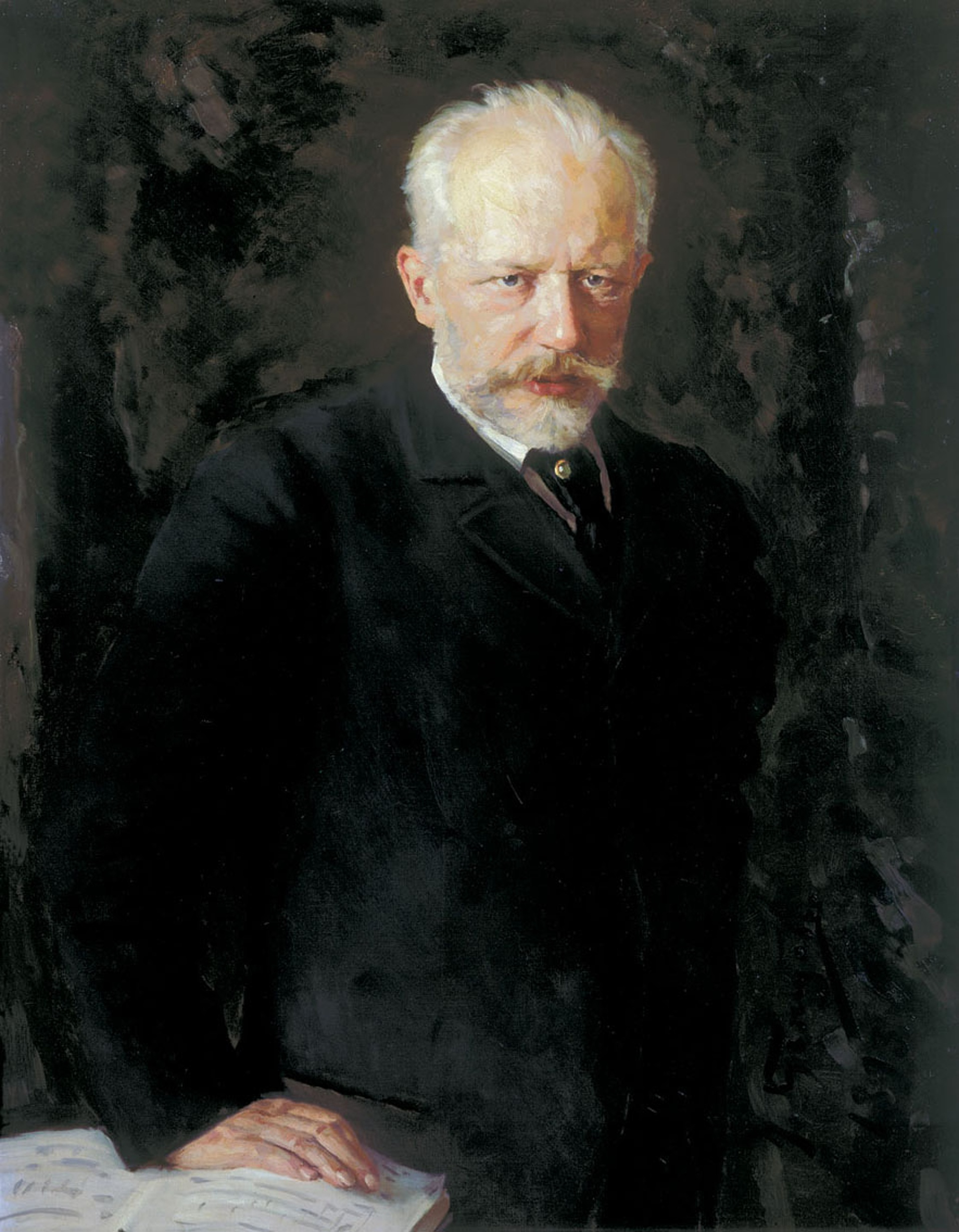
Pyotr Ilyich Tchaikovsky (1840–1893)

Sonata form matured during the Classical era to become the primary form of instrumental compositions throughout the 19th century. Much of the music from the 19th century was referred to as being in the Romantic style. Many great composers lived through this era such as Ludwig van Beethoven, Franz Liszt, Frédéric Chopin, Pyotr Ilyich Tchaikovsky, and Richard Wagner. The list includes:

- Mily Balakirev
- Ludwig van Beethoven
- Hector Berlioz
- Georges Bizet
- Alexander Borodin
- Johannes Brahms
- Anton Bruckner
- Frédéric Chopin
- Claude Debussy
- Antonín Dvořák
- Mikhail Glinka
- Edvard Grieg
- Scott Joplin
- Alexandre Levy
- Franz Liszt
- Gustav Mahler
- Felix Mendelssohn
- Modest Mussorgsky
- Jacques Offenbach
- Niccolò Paganini
- Nikolai Rimsky-Korsakov
- Gioachino Rossini
- Anton Rubinstein
- Camille Saint-Saëns
- Antonio Salieri
- Franz Schubert
- Robert Schumann
- Alexander Scriabin
- Arthur Sullivan
- Pyotr Ilyich Tchaikovsky
- Giuseppe Verdi
- Richard Wagner

=== Sports ===
- 1858: The Melbourne Football Club was formed, starting the sport of Australian Rules Football
- 1867: The Marquess of Queensberry Rules for boxing are published.
- 1872: The first recognised international football match, between England and Scotland, is played.
- 1877: The first test cricket match, between England and Australia, is played.
- 1891: Basketball is invented by James Naismith.
- 1895: Volleyball is invented.
- 1896: Olympic Games revived in Athens.

== Events ==
=== 1801–1850 ===
- 1801: The Kingdom of Great Britain and the Kingdom of Ireland merge to form the United Kingdom.
- 1801: Thomas Jefferson is sworn in as the third President of the United States; he serves until 1809.
- 1802: The Wahhabis of the First Saudi State sack Karbala.
- 1803: William Symington demonstrates his Charlotte Dundas, the "first practical steamboat".
- 1803: The Wahhabis of the First Saudi State capture Mecca and Medina.
- 1804: Austrian Empire founded by Francis I.
- 1804: World population reaches 1 billion.
- 1805: The Battle of Trafalgar eliminates the French and Spanish naval fleets and allows for British dominance of the seas, a major factor for the success of the British Empire later in the century.
- 1805–1848: Muhammad Ali modernizes Egypt.

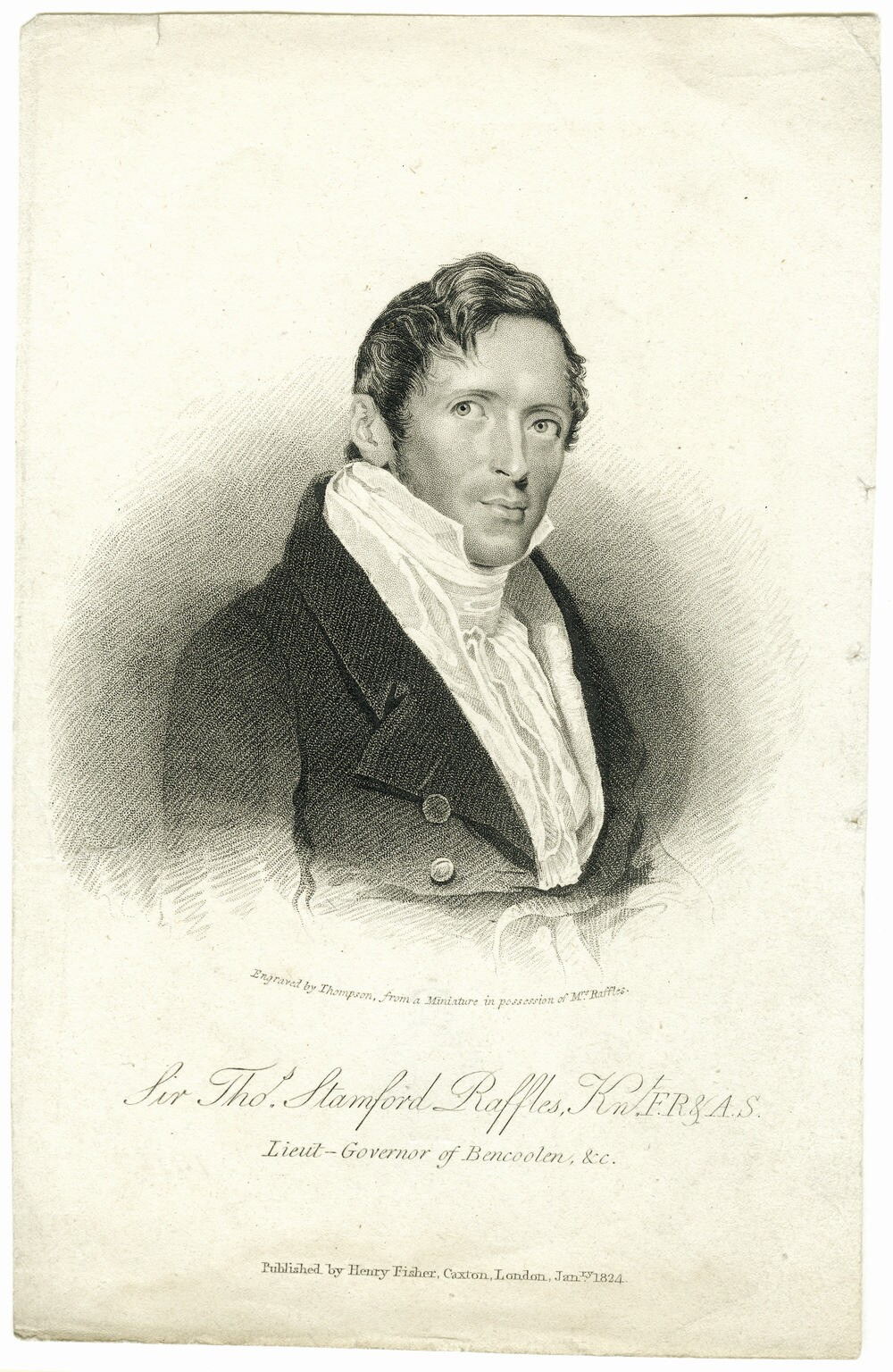
1819: 29 January, Stamford Raffles arrives in Singapore with William Farquhar to establish a trading post for the British East India Company; 8 February, the treaty is signed between Sultan Hussein of Johor, Temenggong Abdul Rahman and Stamford Raffles. Farquhar is installed as the first Resident of the settlement.

- 1810: The University of Berlin was founded. Among its students and faculty are Hegel, Marx, and Bismarck. The German university reform proves to be so successful that its model is copied around the world (see History of European research universities).
- 1814: Elisha Collier invents the Flintlock Revolver.
- 1814 : February 1 Eruption of Mayon Volcano
- 1815: April, Mount Tambora in Sumbawa island erupts, becoming the largest volcanic eruption in recorded history, destroying Tambora culture, and killing at least 71,000 people, including its aftermath. The eruption created global climate anomalies known as "volcanic winter".
- 1816: Year Without a Summer: Unusually cold conditions wreak havoc throughout the Northern Hemisphere, likely influenced by the 1815 explosion of Mount Tambora.
- 1816–1828: Shaka's Zulu Kingdom becomes the largest in Southern Africa.
- 1819: The Republic of Colombia (Gran Colombia) achieves independence after Simón Bolívar's triumph at the Battle of Boyacá.
- 1819: The modern city of Singapore is established by the British East India Company.
- 1820: Discovery of Antarctica.
- 1820: Liberia founded by the American Colonization Society for freed American slaves.
- 1820: Dissolution of the Maratha Empire.
- 1821–1823: First Mexican Empire, as Mexico's first post-independence government, ruled by Emperor Agustín I of Mexico.
- 1822: Pedro I of Brazil declared Brazil's independence from Portugal on 7 September.
- 1823: Monroe Doctrine declared by US President James Monroe.
- 1825: The Decembrist revolt.

Decembrists at the Senate Square

- 1829: Sir Robert Peel founds the Metropolitan Police Service, the first modern police force.

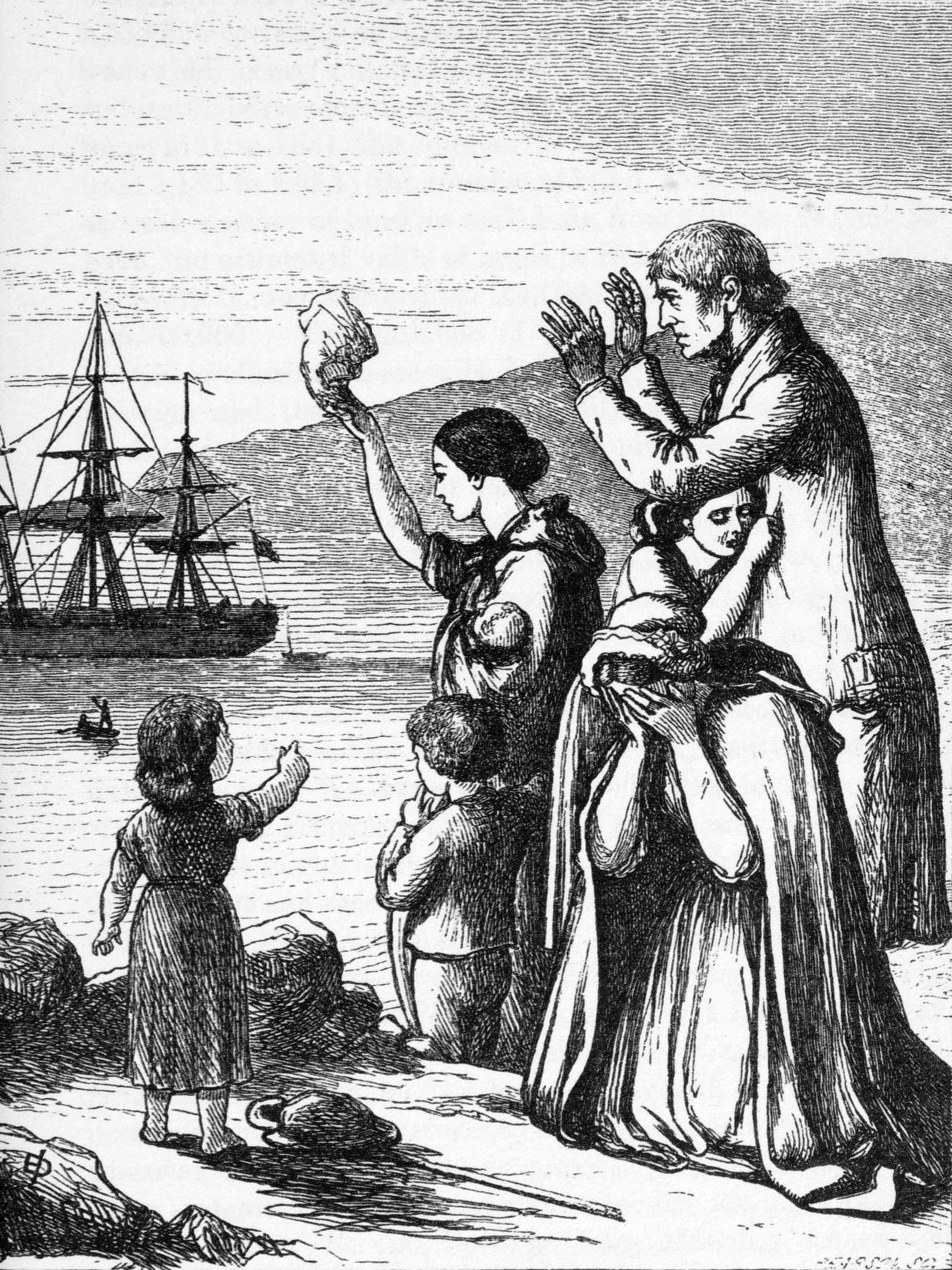
Emigrants leaving Ireland. From 1830 to 1914, almost 5 million Irish people emigrated to the U.S.

- 1830: Anglo-Russian rivalry over Afghanistan, the Great Game, commences and concludes in 1895.
- 1831: November Uprising ends with crushing defeat for Poland in the Battle of Warsaw.
- 1832: The British Parliament passes the Great Reform Act 1832.
- 1834–1859: Imam Shamil's rebellion in Russian-occupied Caucasus.
- 1835–1836: The Texas Revolution in Mexico resulted in the short-lived Republic of Texas.
- 1836: Samuel Colt popularizes the revolver and sets up a firearms company to manufacture his invention of the Colt Paterson revolver, a six bullets firearm shot one by one without reloading manually.
- 1837–1838: Rebellions of 1837 in Canada.
- 1838: By this time, 46,000 Native Americans have been forcibly relocated in the Trail of Tears.
- 1839–1860: After the First and Second Opium Wars, France, the United Kingdom, the United States and Russia gain many trade and associated concessions from China resulting in the start of the decline of the Qing dynasty.
- 1839–1919: Anglo-Afghan Wars lead to stalemate and the establishment of the Durand line
- 1842: Treaty of Nanking cedes Hong Kong to the British.
- 1843: The first wagon train sets out from Missouri.
- 1844: Rochdale Society of Equitable Pioneers establish what is considered the first cooperative in the world.
- 1845–1849: The Great Famine of Ireland leads to the Irish diaspora.
- 1848: The Communist Manifesto published.
- 1848: Seneca Falls Convention is the first women's rights convention in the United States and leads to the battle for women's suffrage.
- 1848–1855: California Gold Rush.
- 1849: Earliest recorded air raid, as Austria employs 200 balloons to deliver ordnance against Venice.
- 1850: The Little Ice Age ends around this time.
- 1850: Franz Hermann Schulze-Delitzsch establishes the first cooperative financial institution.

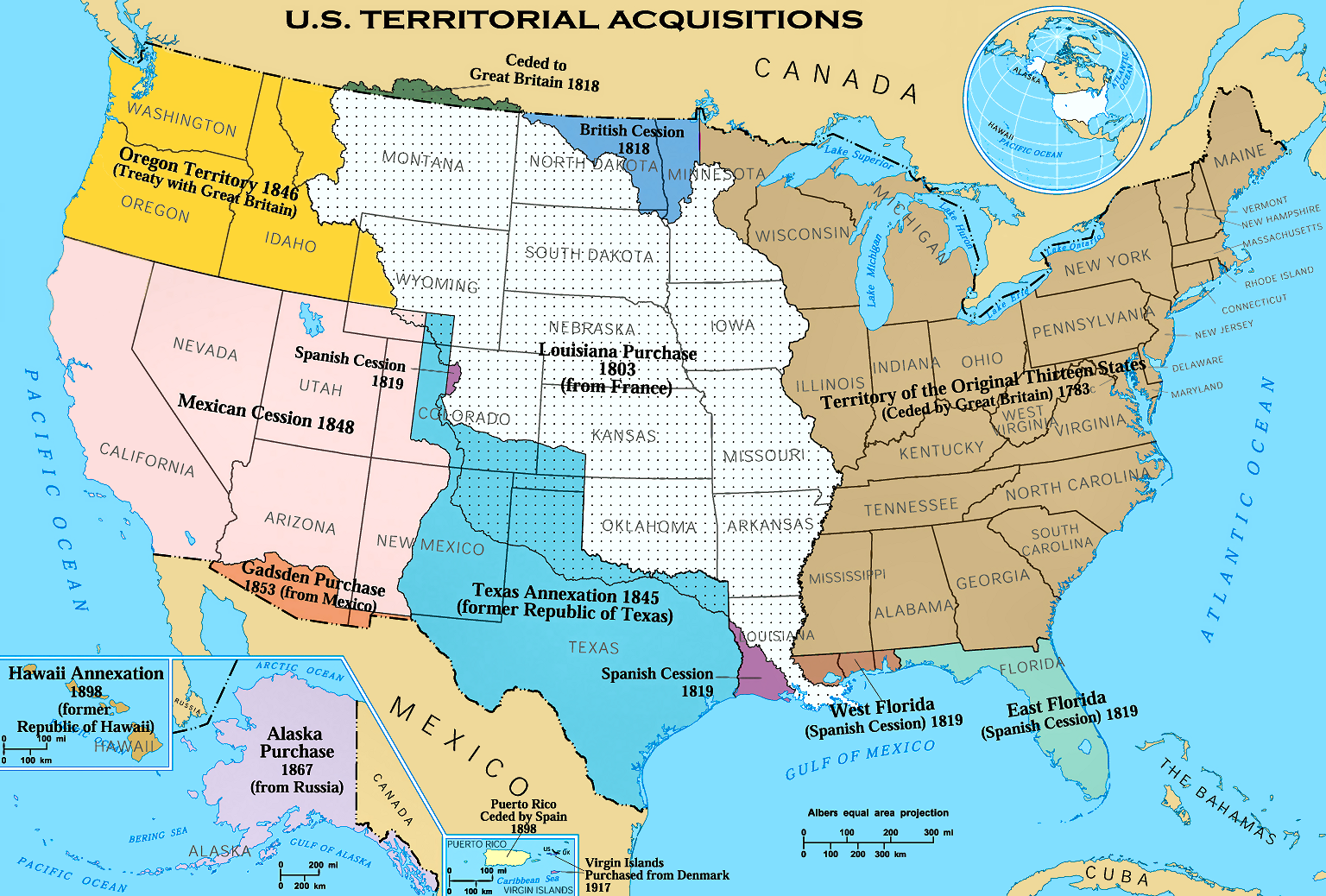
Historical territorial expansion of the United States

=== 1851–1900 ===
- 1851: The Great Exhibition in London was the world's first international Expo or World Fair.
- 1852: Frederick Douglass delivers his speech "The Meaning of July Fourth for the Negro" in Rochester, New York.
- 1857: Sir Joseph Whitworth designs the first long-range sniper rifle.
- 1857–1858: Indian Rebellion of 1857. The British Empire assumes control of India from the East India Company.
- 1858: Construction of Big Ben is completed.
- 1859–1869: Suez Canal is constructed.

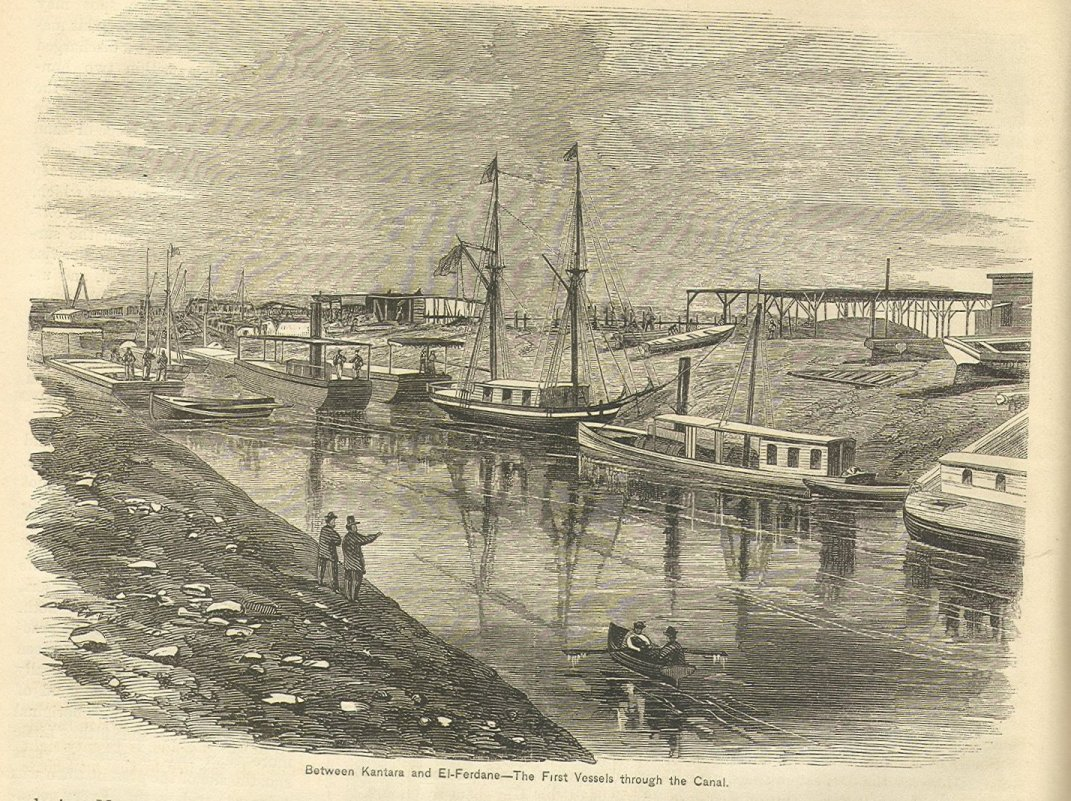
The first vessels sail through the Suez Canal.

- 1860: Giuseppe Garibaldi launches the Expedition of the Thousand.
- 1861: Russia abolishes serfdom.
- 1862–1877: Muslim Rebellion in north-west China.
- 1863: Formation of the International Red Cross is followed by the adoption of the First Geneva Convention in 1864.
- 1865–1877: Reconstruction in the United States; Slavery is banned in the United States by the Thirteenth Amendment to the United States Constitution.
- 1867: Canada is formed, via the process of Canadian Confederation.
- 1868: Michael Barrett is the last person to be publicly hanged in England.
- 1869: The Suez Canal opens linking the Mediterranean to the Red Sea.

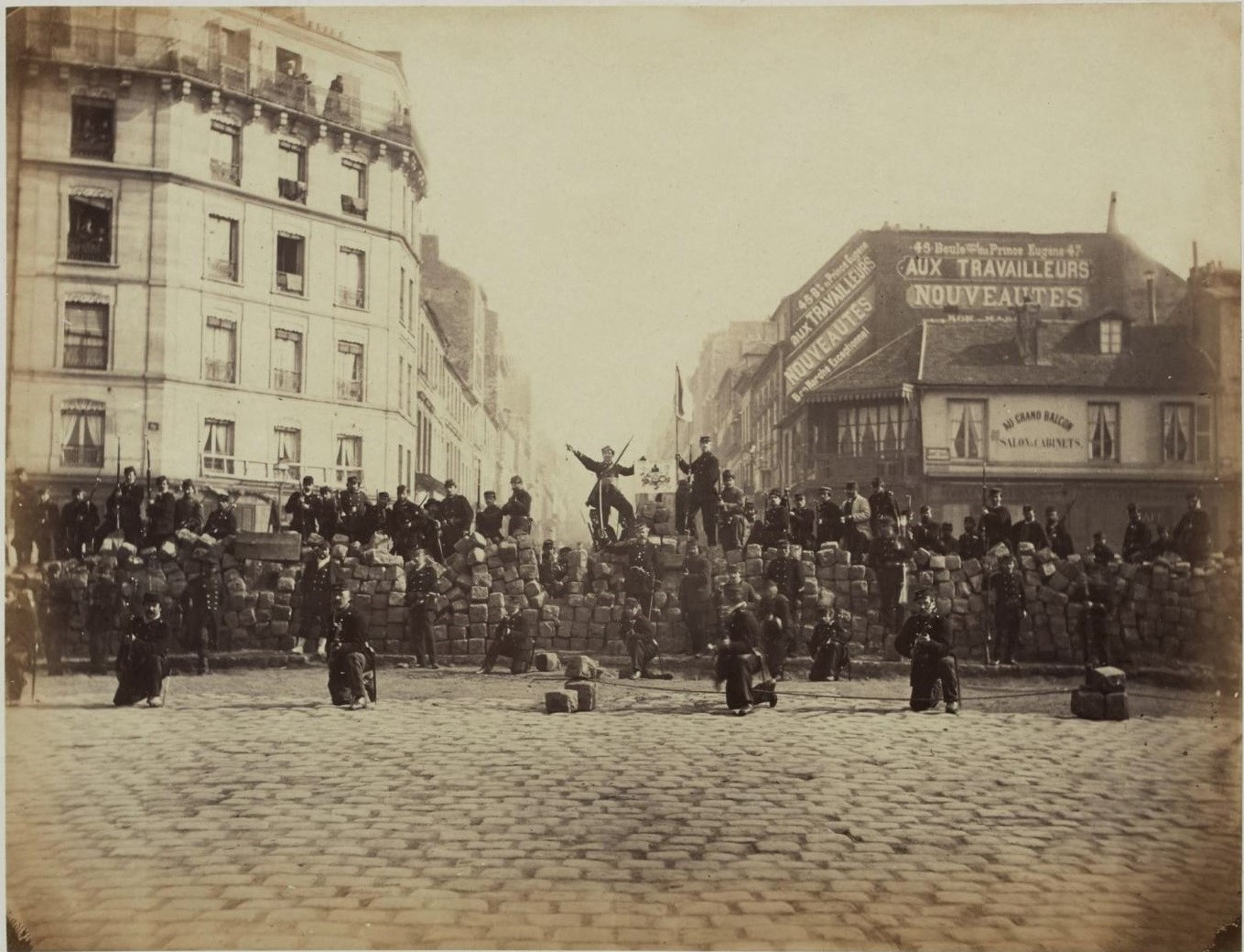
A barricade in the Paris Commune, 18 March 1871. Around 30,000 Parisians were killed, and thousands more were later executed.

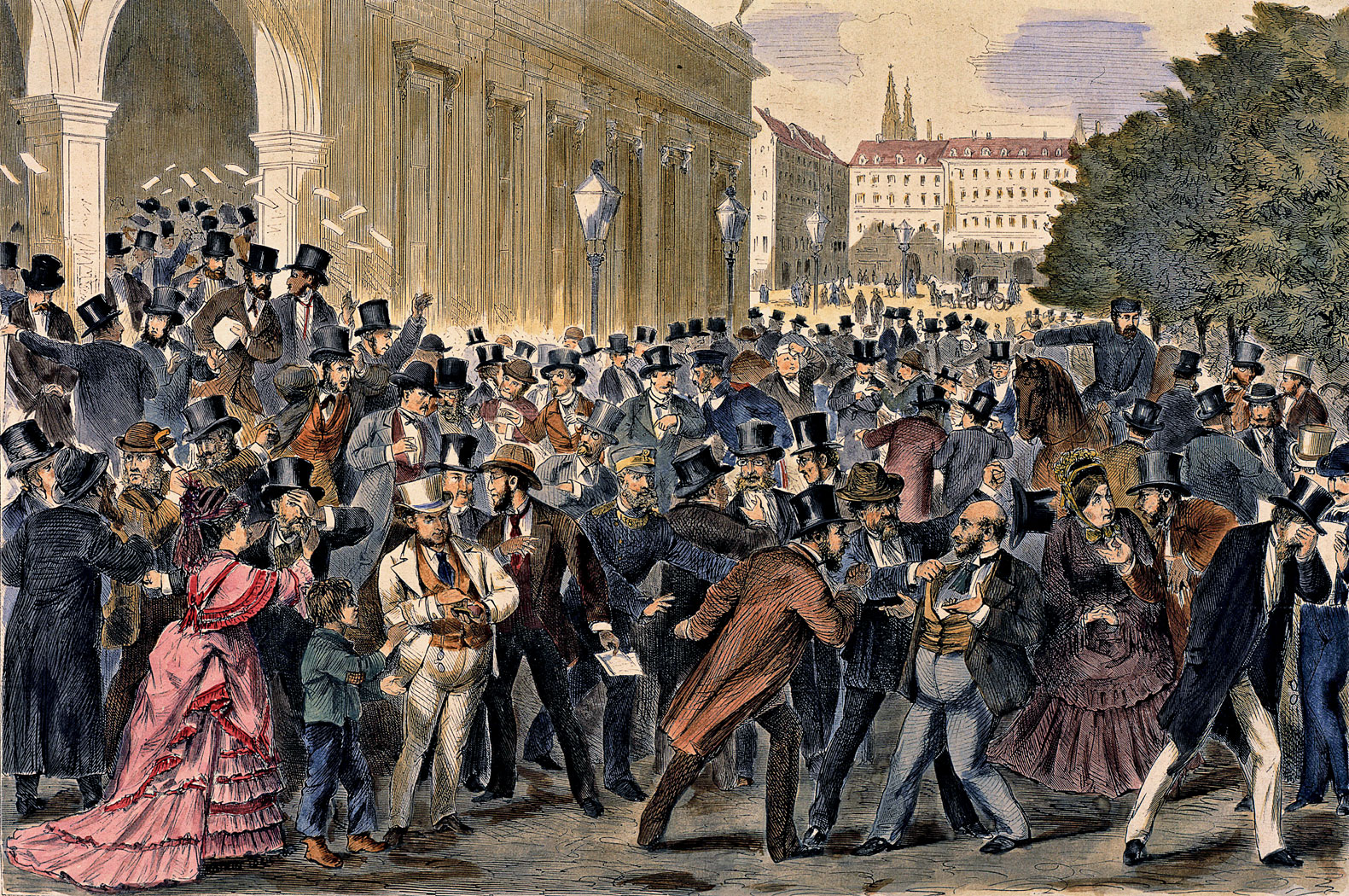
Black Friday, 9 May 1873, Vienna Stock Exchange. The Panic of 1873 and Long Depression followed.

- 1870: Official dismantling of the Cultivation System and beginning of a 'Liberal Policy' of deregulated exploitation of the Netherlands East Indies.
- 1870–1890: Long Depression in Western Europe and North America.
- 1871–1872: Famine in Persia is believed to have caused the death of 2 million.
- 1871: The Paris Commune briefly rules the French capital.
- 1872: Yellowstone National Park, the first national park, is created.
- 1874: The Société Anonyme Coopérative des Artistes Peintres, Sculpteurs, and Graveurs, better known as the Impressionists, organize and present their first public group exhibition at the Paris studio of the photographer Nadar.
- 1874: The Home Rule Movement is established in Ireland.
- 1875: HMS Challenger surveys the deepest point in the Earth's oceans, the Challenger Deep
- 1876: Battle of the Little Bighorn leads to the death of General Custer and victory for the alliance of Lakota, Cheyenne and Arapaho
- 1876–1914: The massive expansion in population, territory, industry and wealth in the United States is referred to as the Gilded Age.
- 1877: Great Railroad Strike in the United States may have been the world's first nationwide labour strike.
- 1881: Wave of pogroms begins in the Russian Empire.
- 1881–1882: The Jules Ferry laws are passed in France establishing free, secular education.
- 1883: Krakatoa volcano explosion, one of the largest in modern history.
- 1883: The quagga is rendered extinct.
- 1886: Construction of the Statue of Liberty; Coca-Cola is developed.
- 1888: Founding of the shipping line Koninklijke Paketvaart-Maatschappij (KPM) that supported the unification and development of the colonial economy.
- 1888: The Golden Law abolishes slavery in Brazil.
- 1889: Eiffel Tower is inaugurated in Paris.

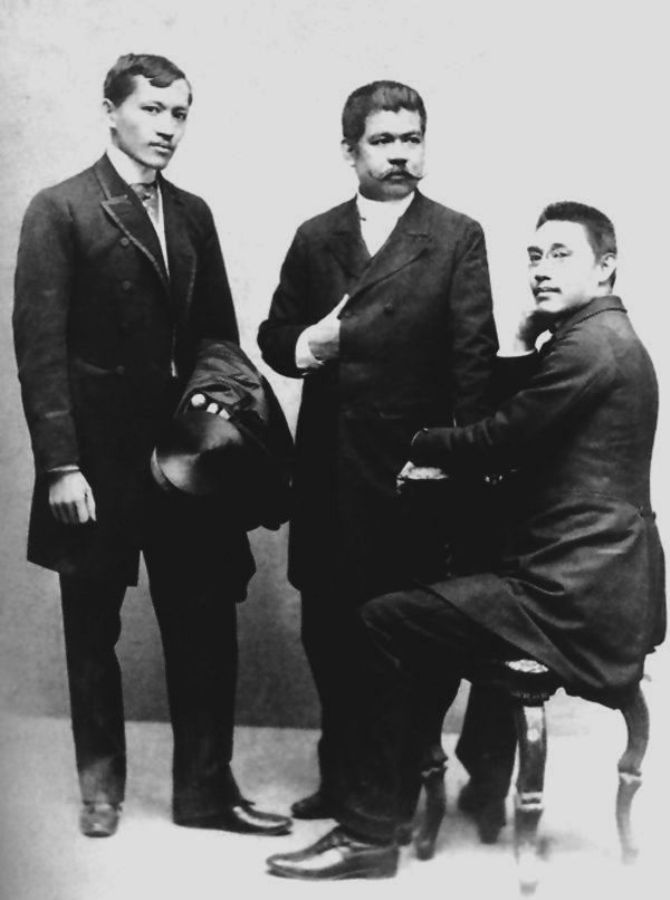
Studio portrait of Ilustrados in Europe, c. 1890

- 1889: A republican military coup establishes the First Brazilian Republic. The parliamentary constitutional monarchy is abolished.
- 1889–1890: 1889–1890 pandemic kills 1 million people.
- 1890: First use of the electric chair as a method of execution.
- 1892: The World's Columbian Exposition was held in Chicago celebrating the 400th anniversary of Christopher Columbus's arrival in the New World.
- 1892: Fingerprinting is officially adopted for the first time.
- 1893: New Zealand becomes the first country to enact women's suffrage.
- 1893: The Coremans-de Vriendt law is passed in Belgium, creating legal equality for French and Dutch languages.
- 1894: The Dutch intervention in Lombok and Karangasem resulted in the looting and destruction of Cakranegara Palace in Mataram. J. L. A. Brandes, a Dutch philologist, discovers and secures Nagarakretagama manuscript in Lombok royal library.
- 1896: Philippine Revolution ends declaring Philippines free from Spanish rule.
- 1898: The United States gains control of Cuba, Puerto Rico, and the Philippines after the Spanish–American War.
- 1898: Empress Dowager Cixi of China engineers a coup d'état, marking the end of the Hundred Days' Reform; the Guangxu Emperor is arrested.
- 1900: Exposition Universelle held in Paris, prominently featuring the growing art trend Art Nouveau.
- 1900–1901: Eight nations invade China at the same time and ransack Forbidden City.

=== Last survivors ===
Born on 19 April 1897, Japanese Jiroemon Kimura died on 12 June 2013, marking the death of the last man verified to have been born in the century. Kimura remains to date the oldest verified man in history. Subsequently, on 21 April 2018, Japanese Nabi Tajima (born 4 August 1900) died as the last person to verifiably have been born in the century.

== Supplementary portrait gallery ==
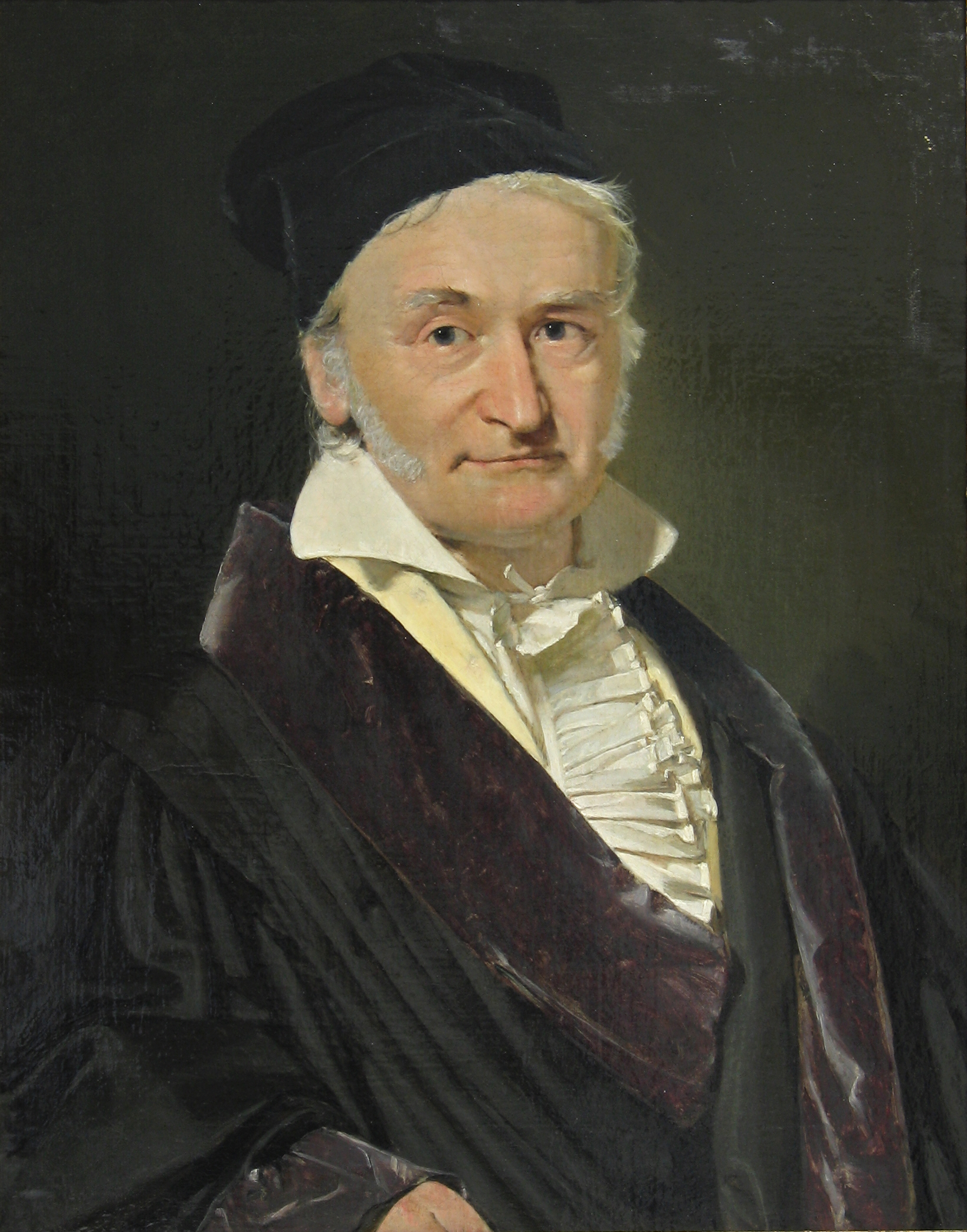
Carl Friedrich Gauss

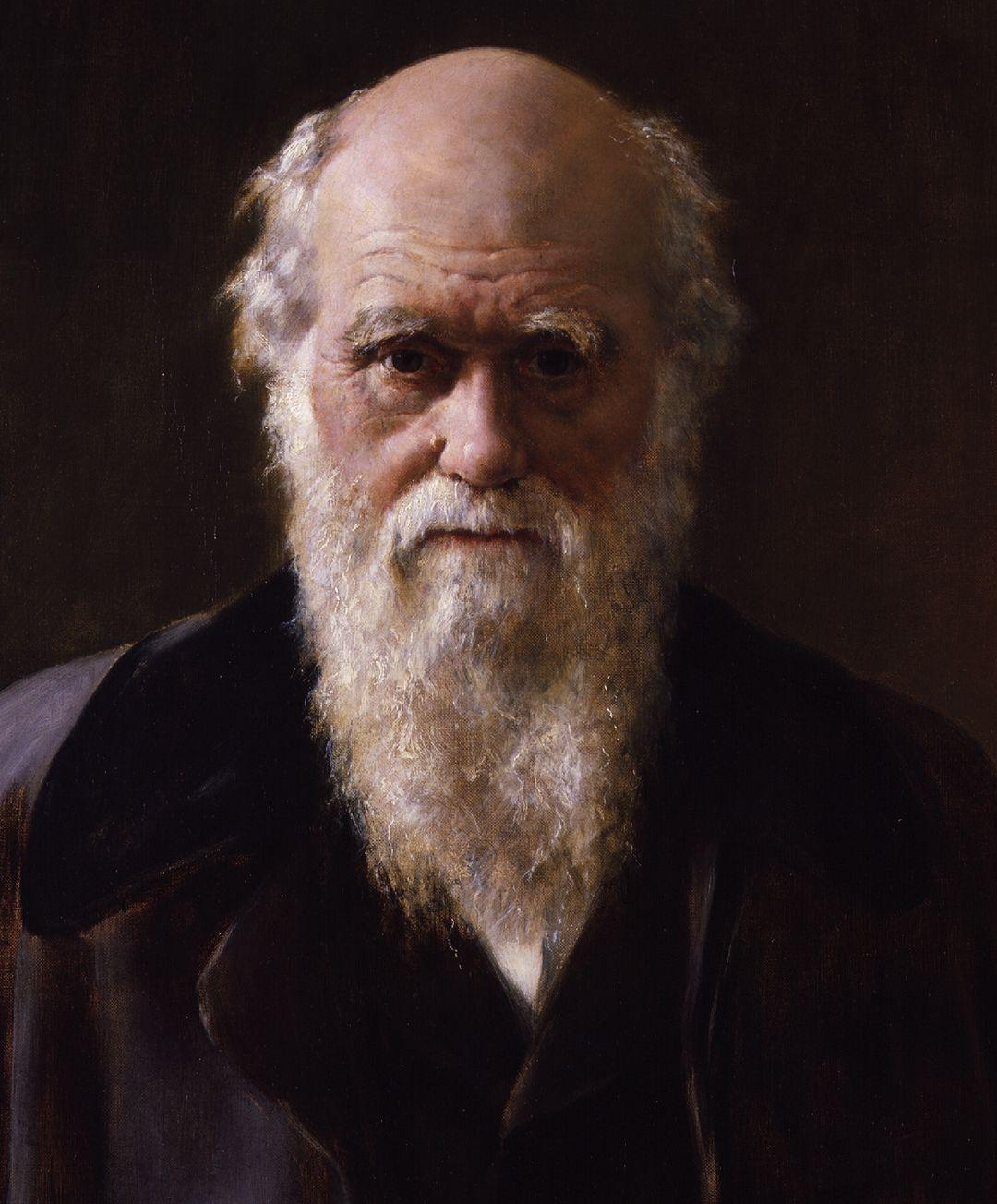
Charles Darwin

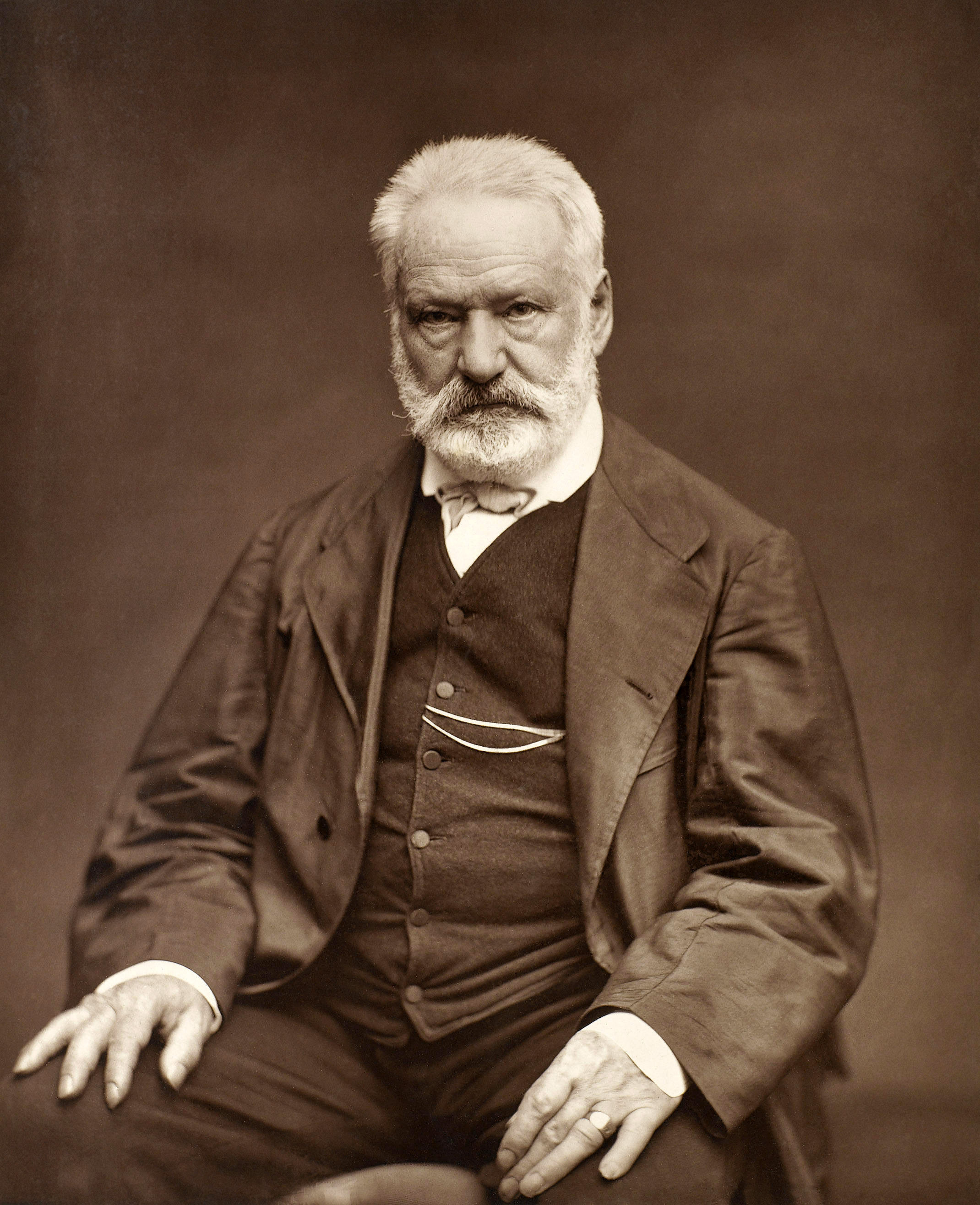
Victor Hugo, c. 1876

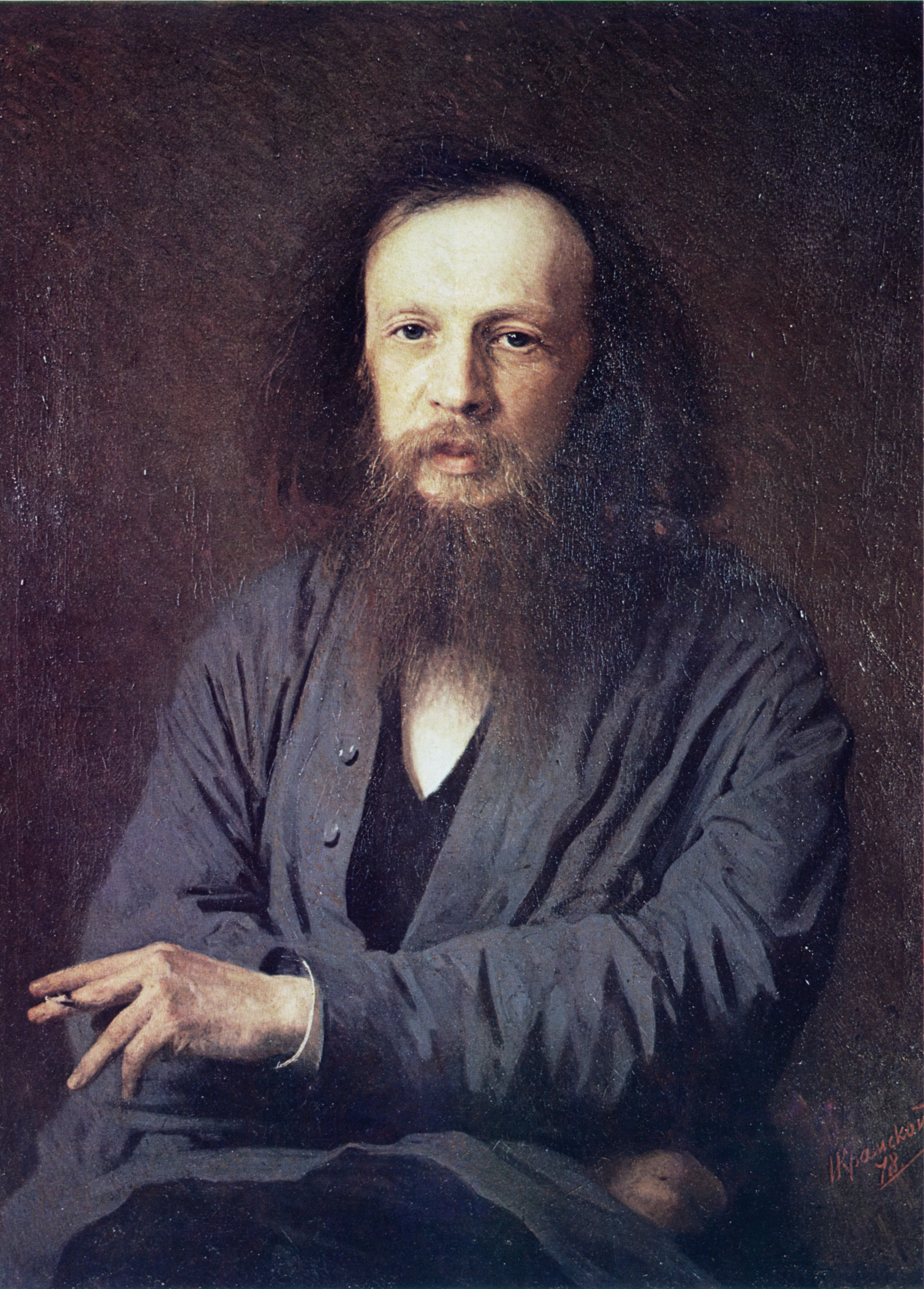
Dmitri Mendeleev

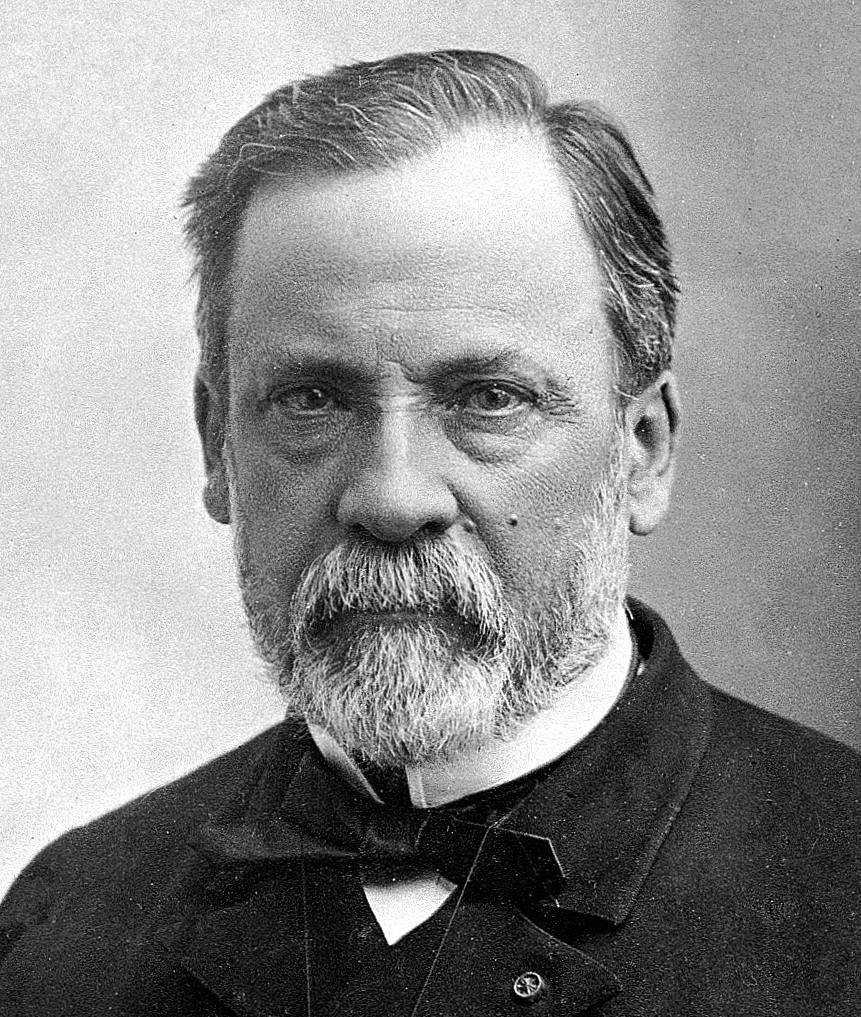
Louis Pasteur, 1878

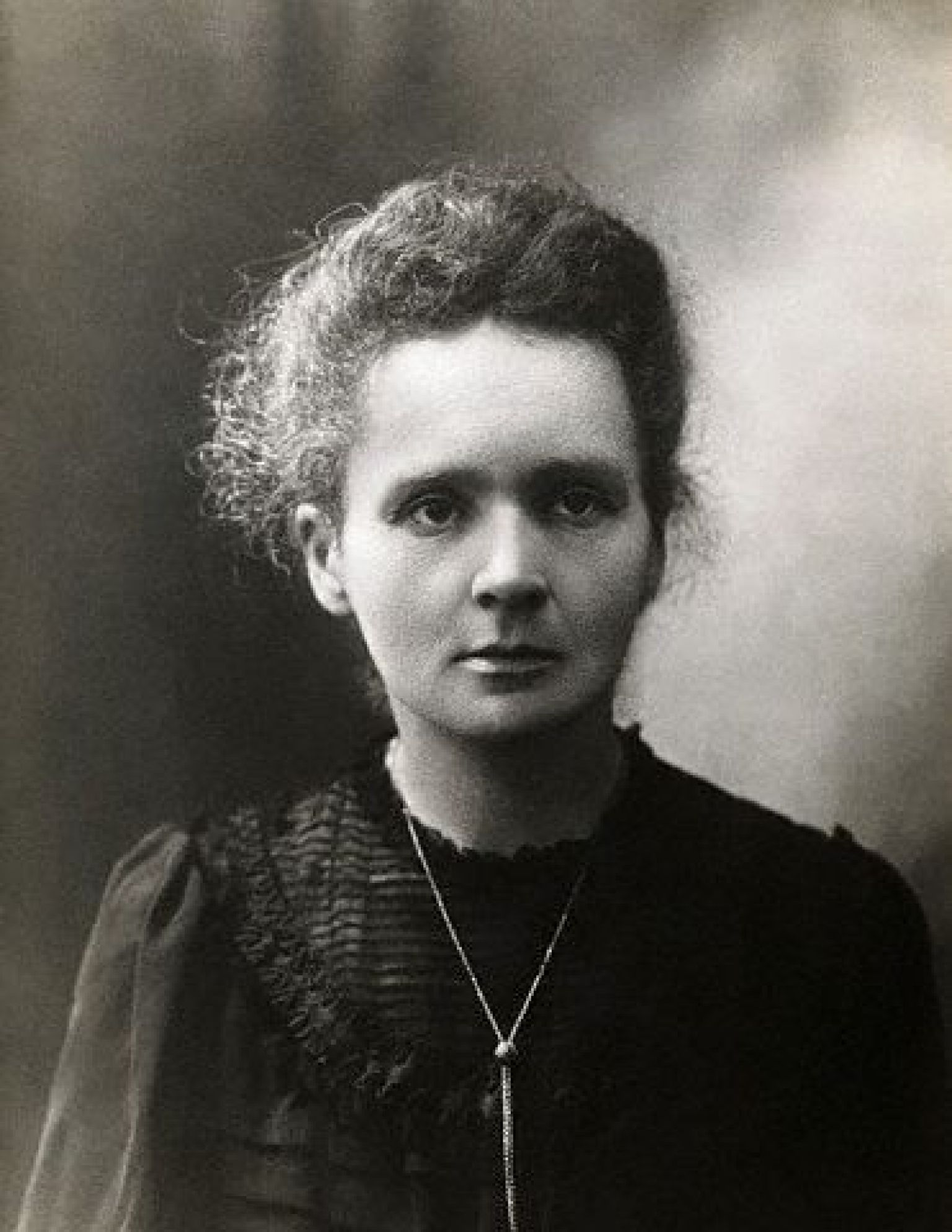
Marie Curie, c. 1898

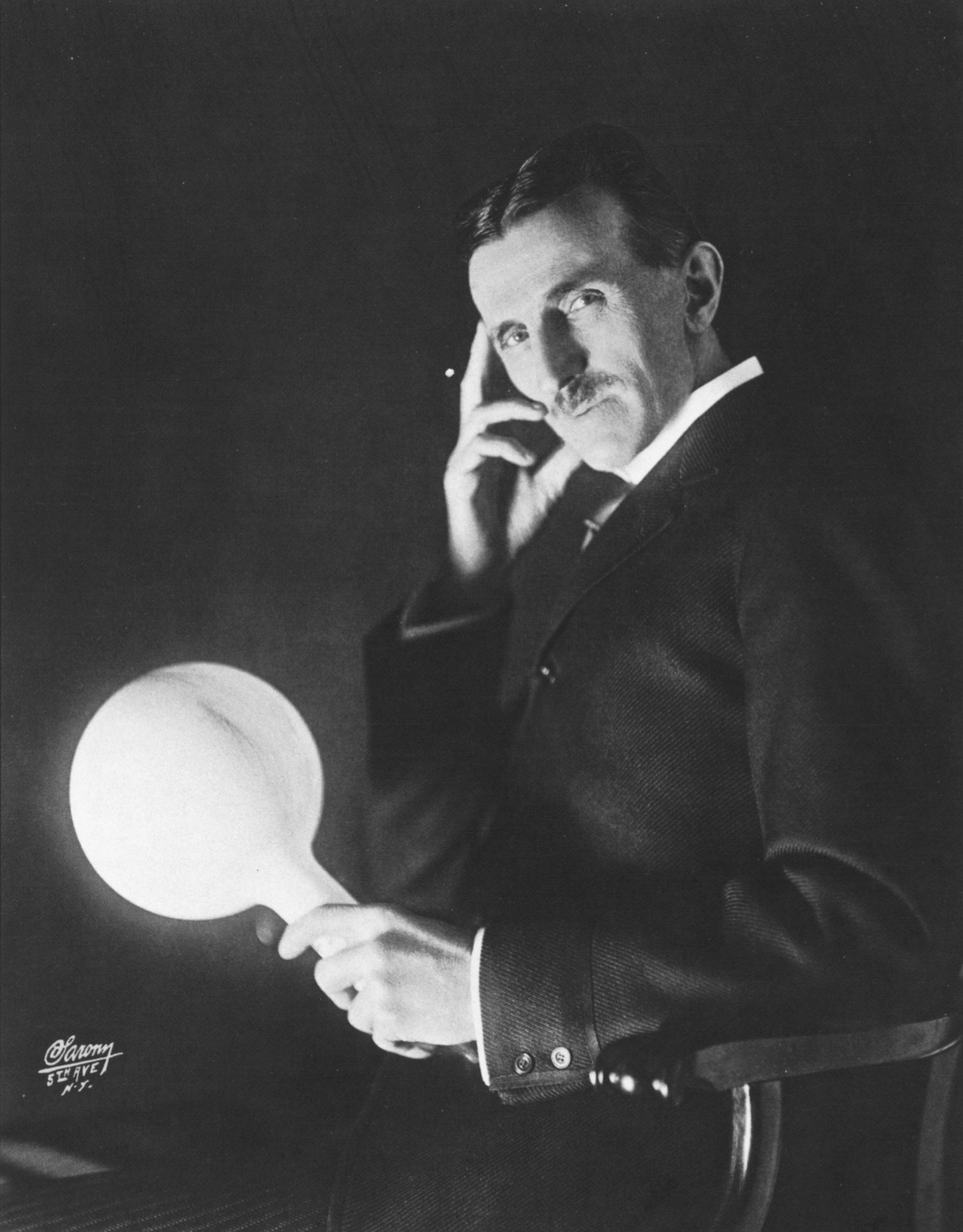
Nikola Tesla

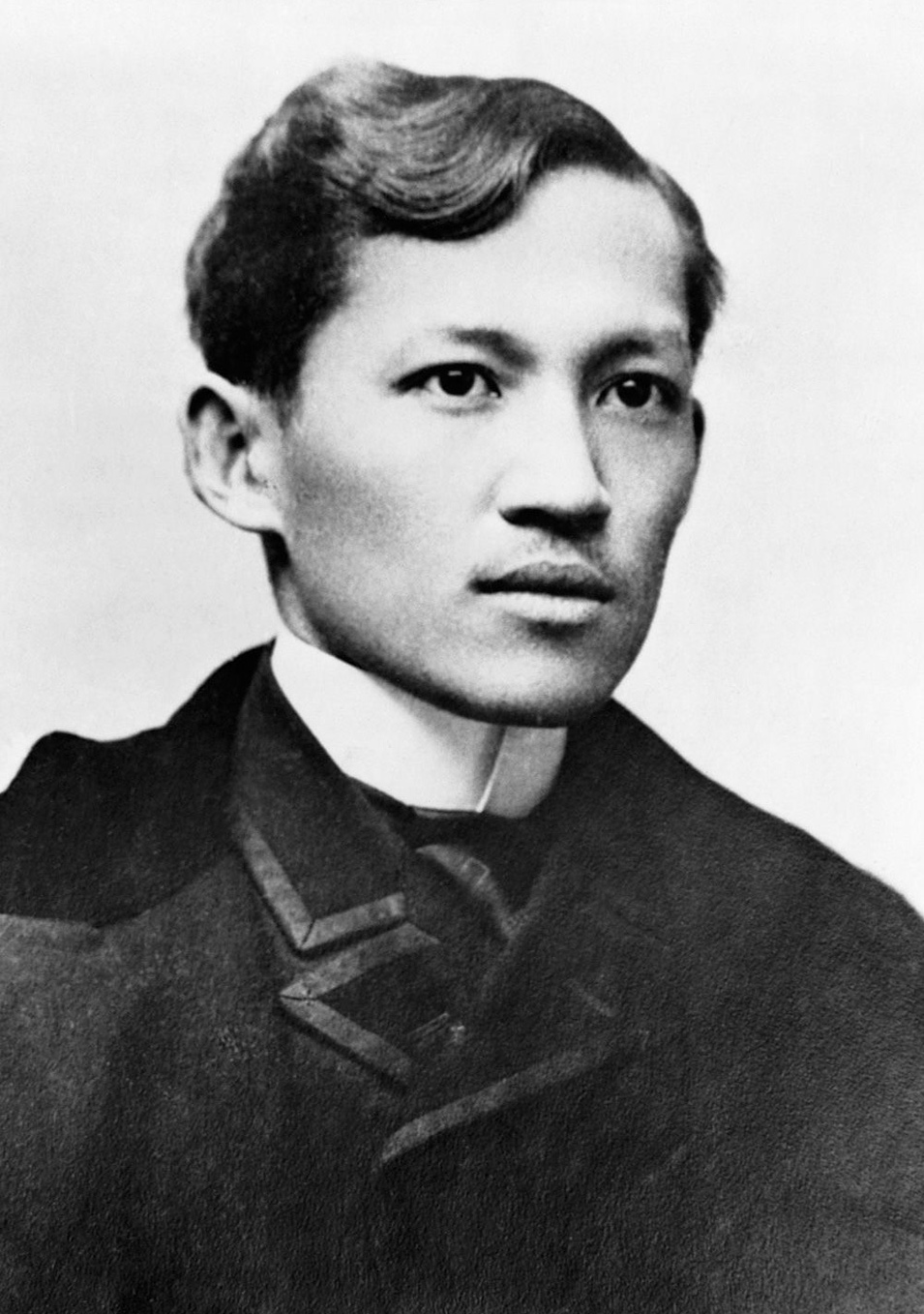
José Rizal

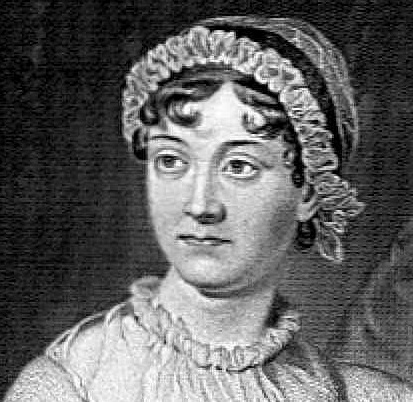
Jane Austen

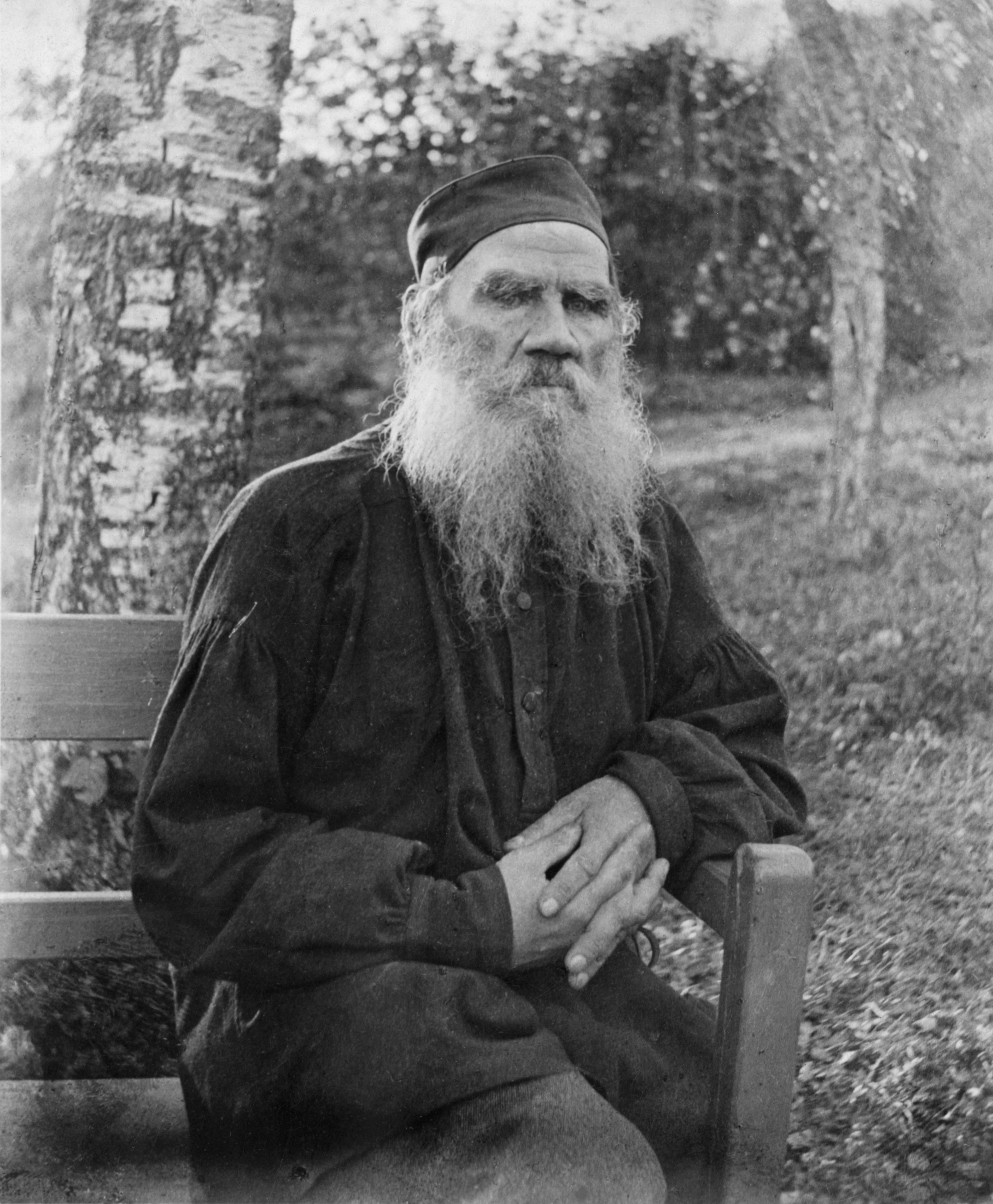
Leo Tolstoy, c. 1897

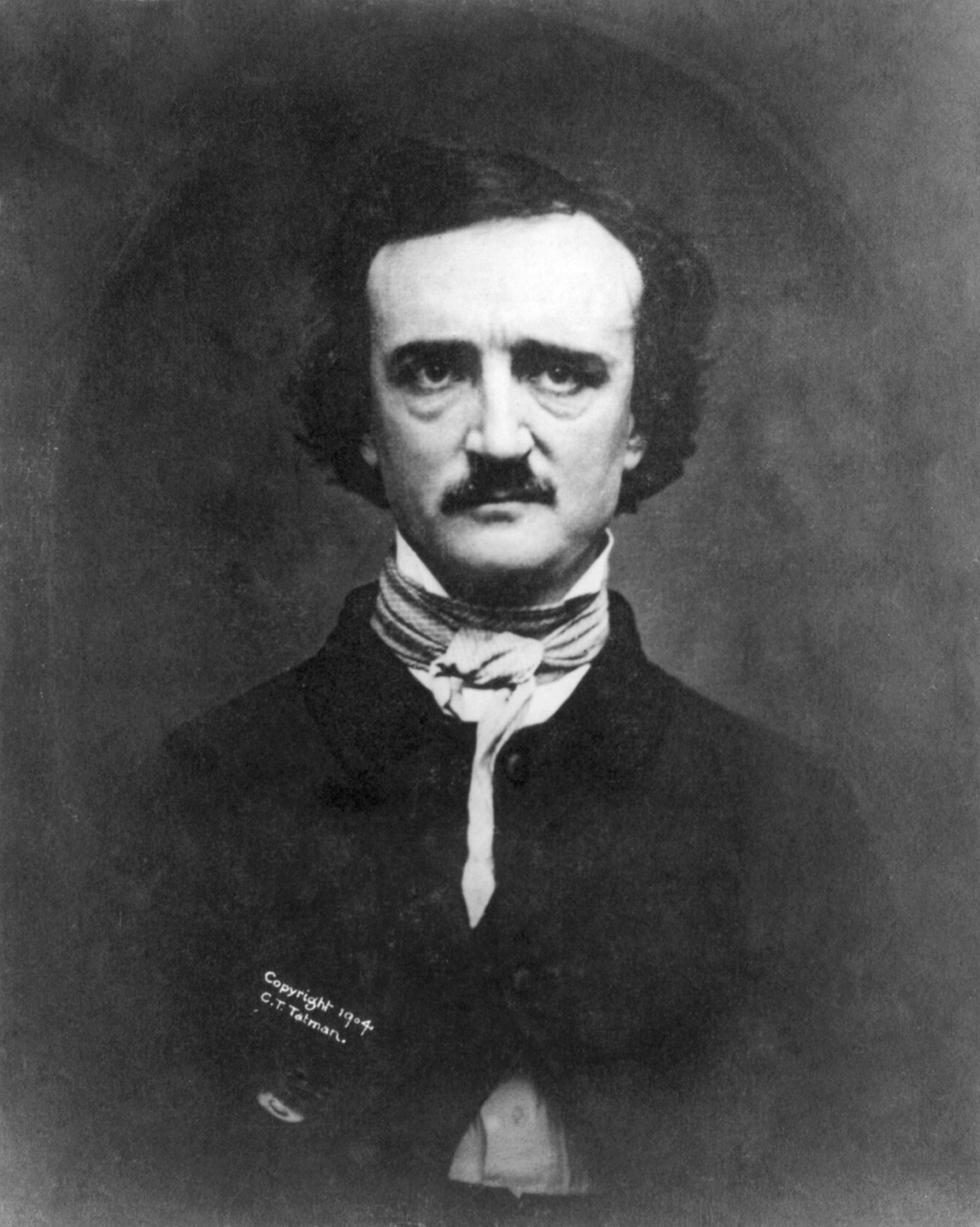
Edgar Allan Poe

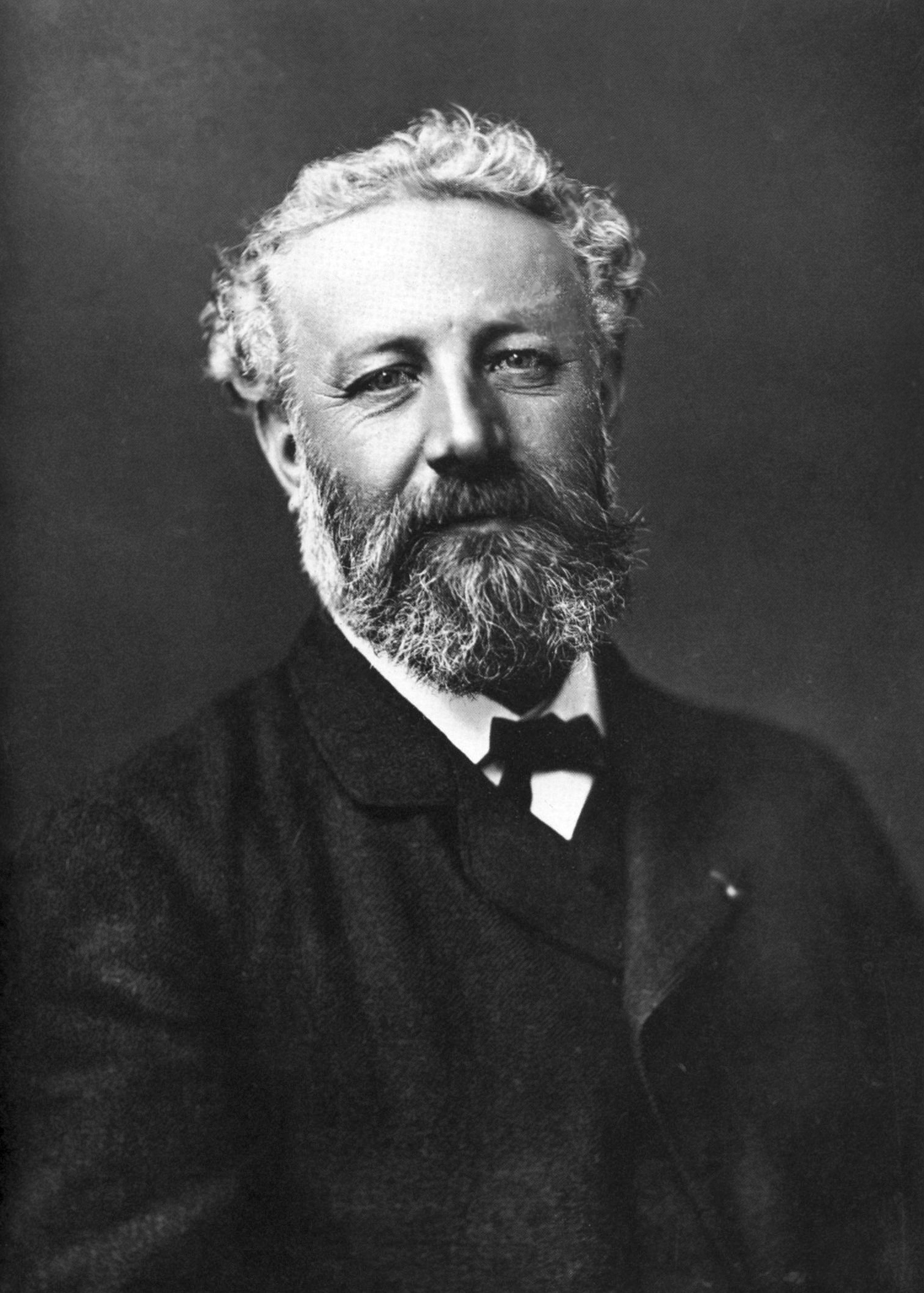
Jules Verne

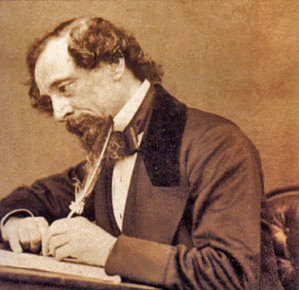
Charles Dickens

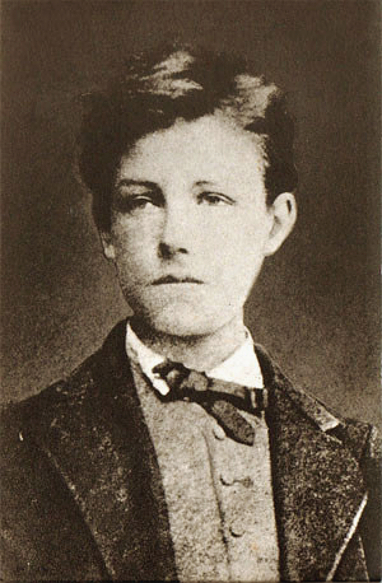
Arthur Rimbaud, c. 1872

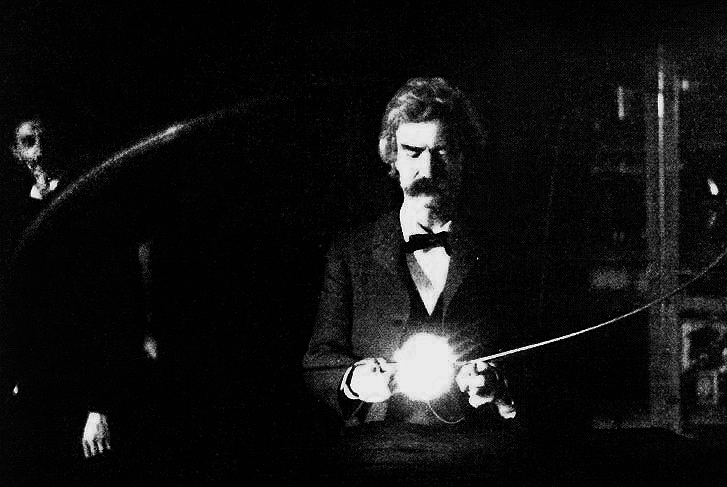
Mark Twain, 1894

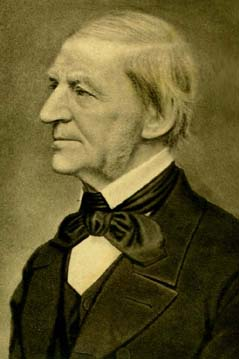
Ralph Waldo Emerson

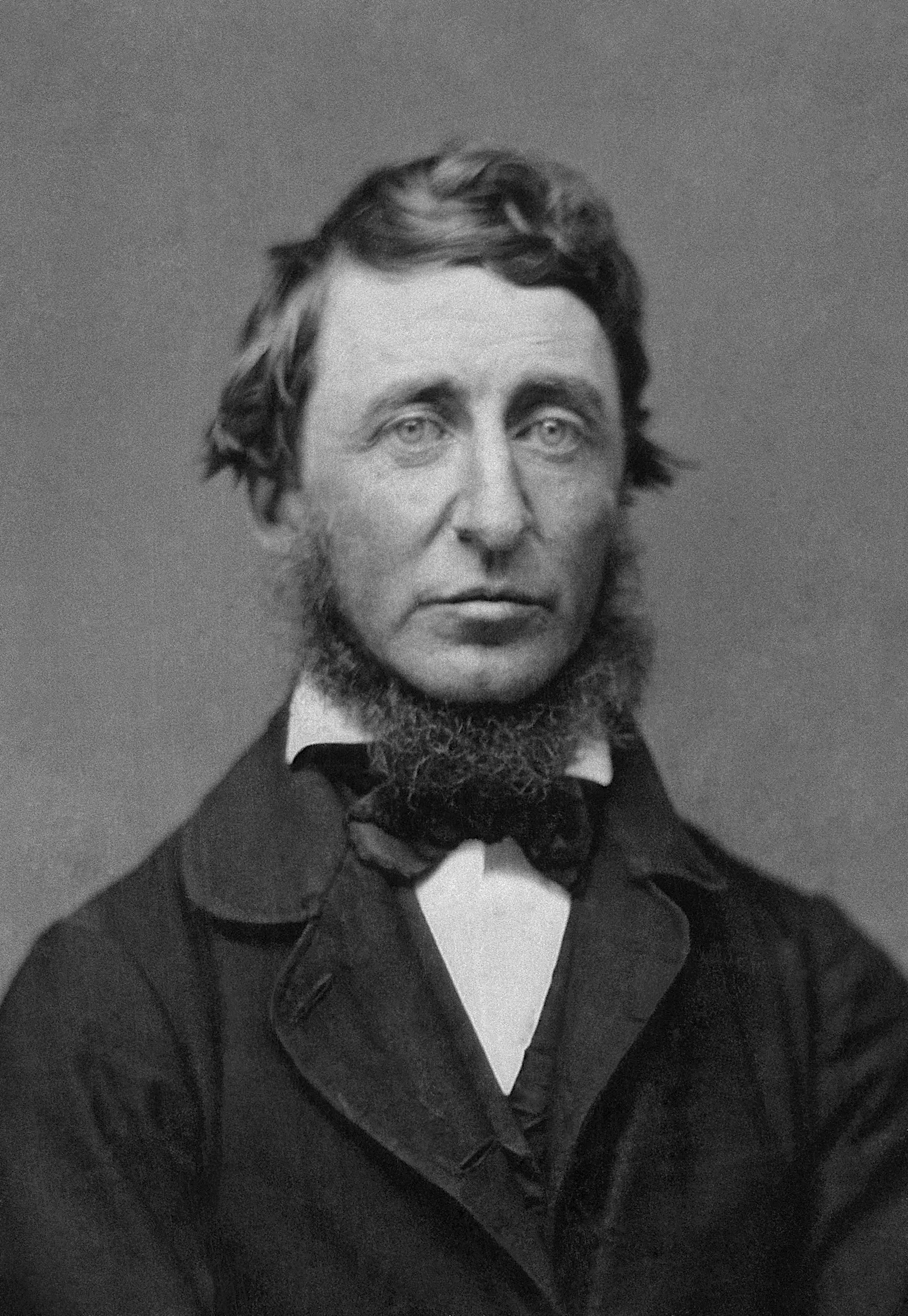
Henry David Thoreau, 1861

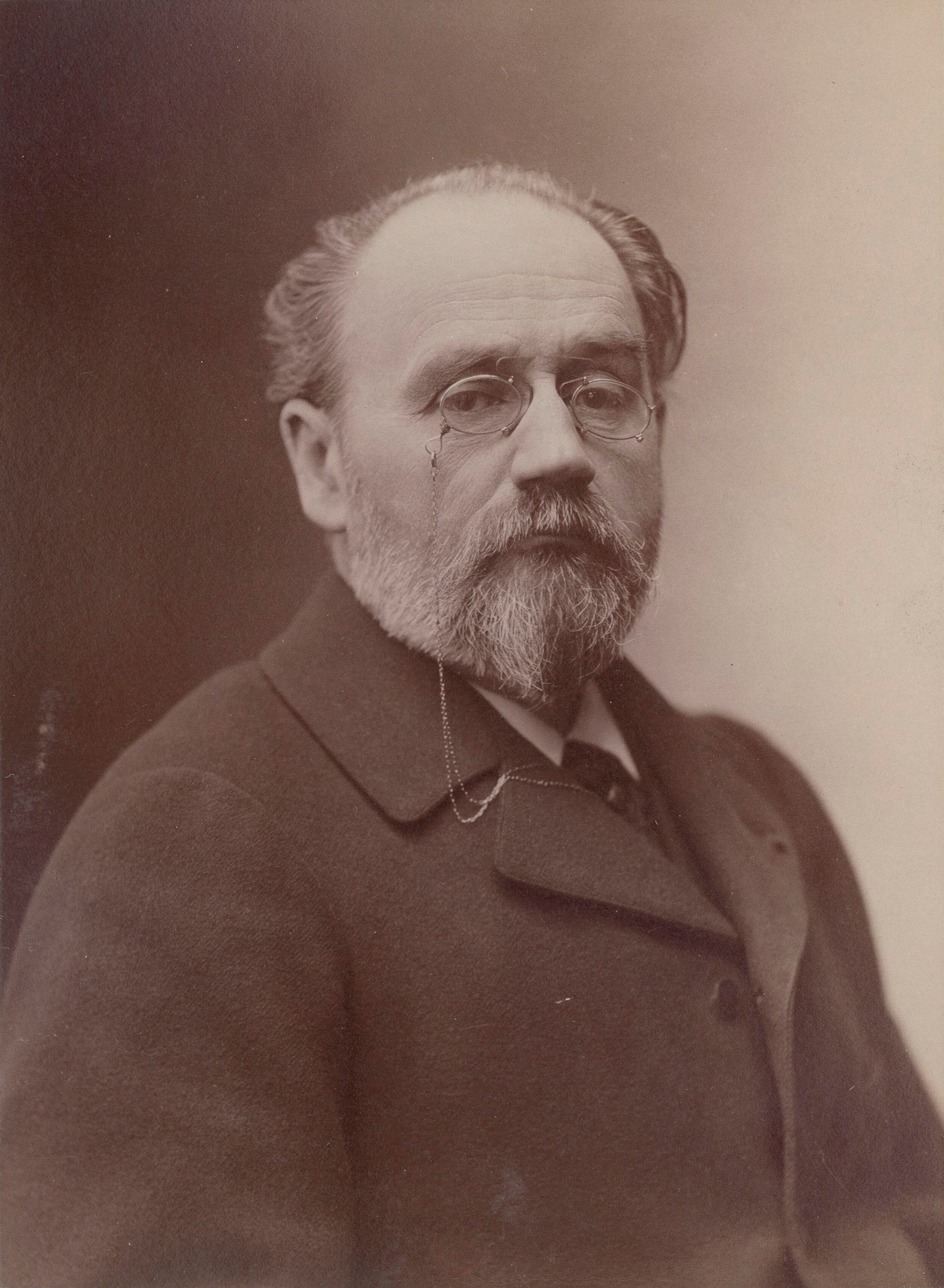
Émile Zola, c. 1900

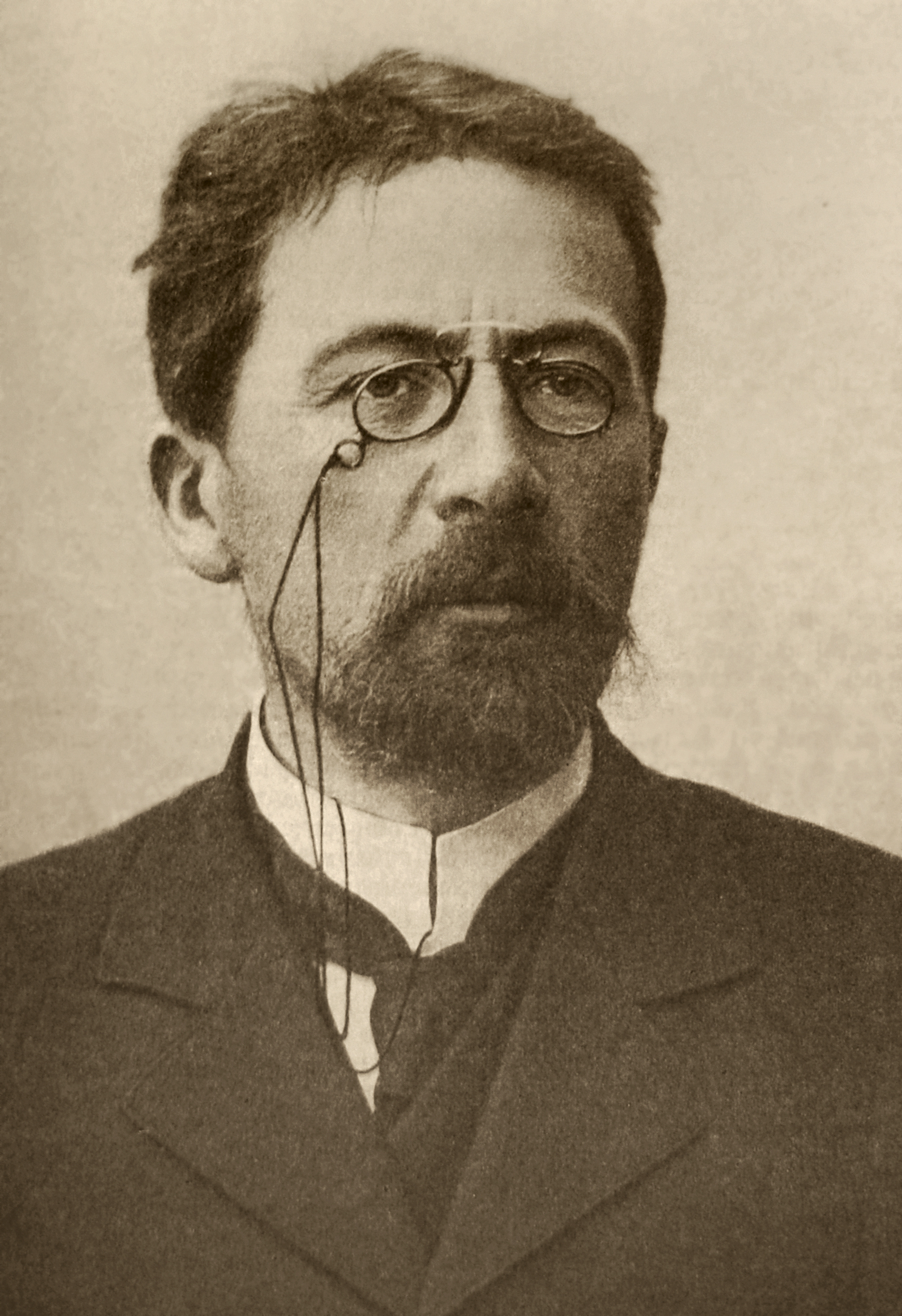
Anton Chekhov

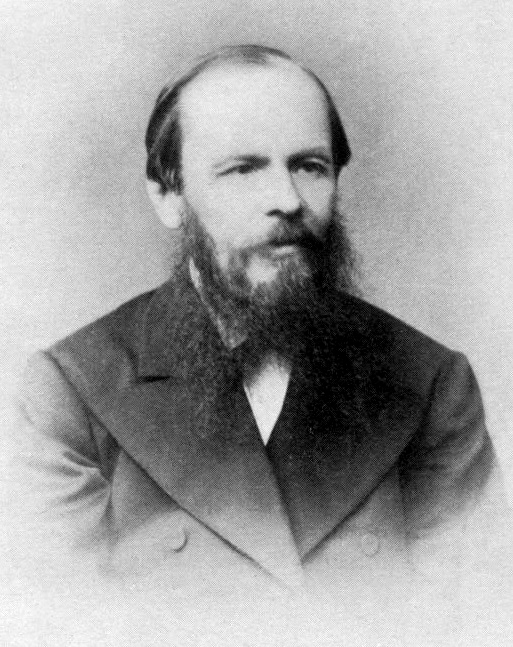
Fyodor Dostoevsky, 1876

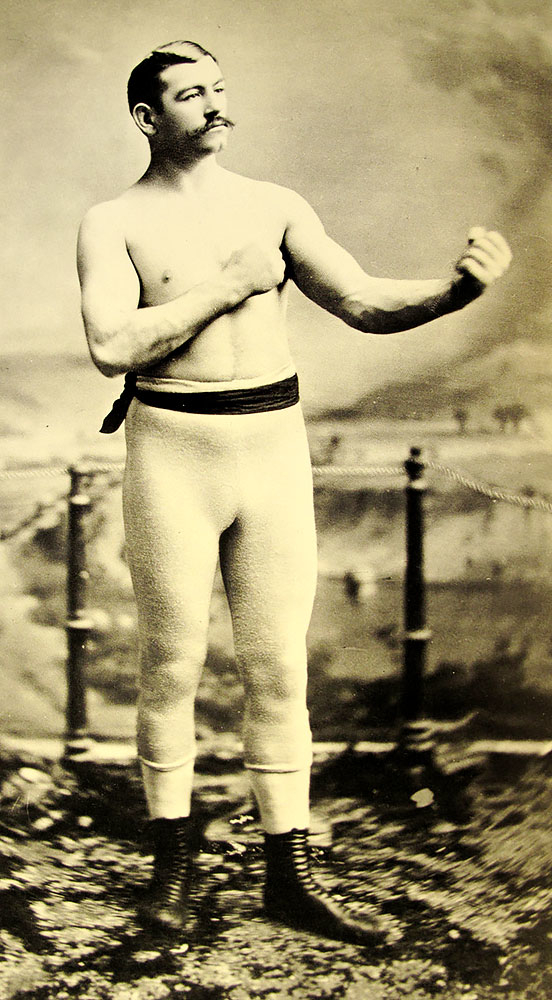
John L Sullivan in his prime, c. 1882

David Livingstone 1864, left Britain for Africa in 1840

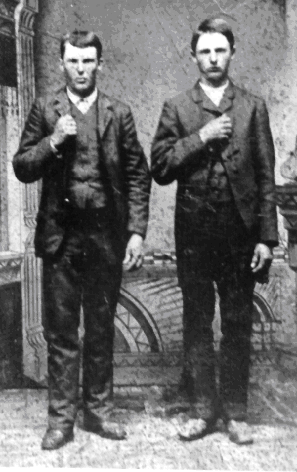
Jesse and Frank James, 1872

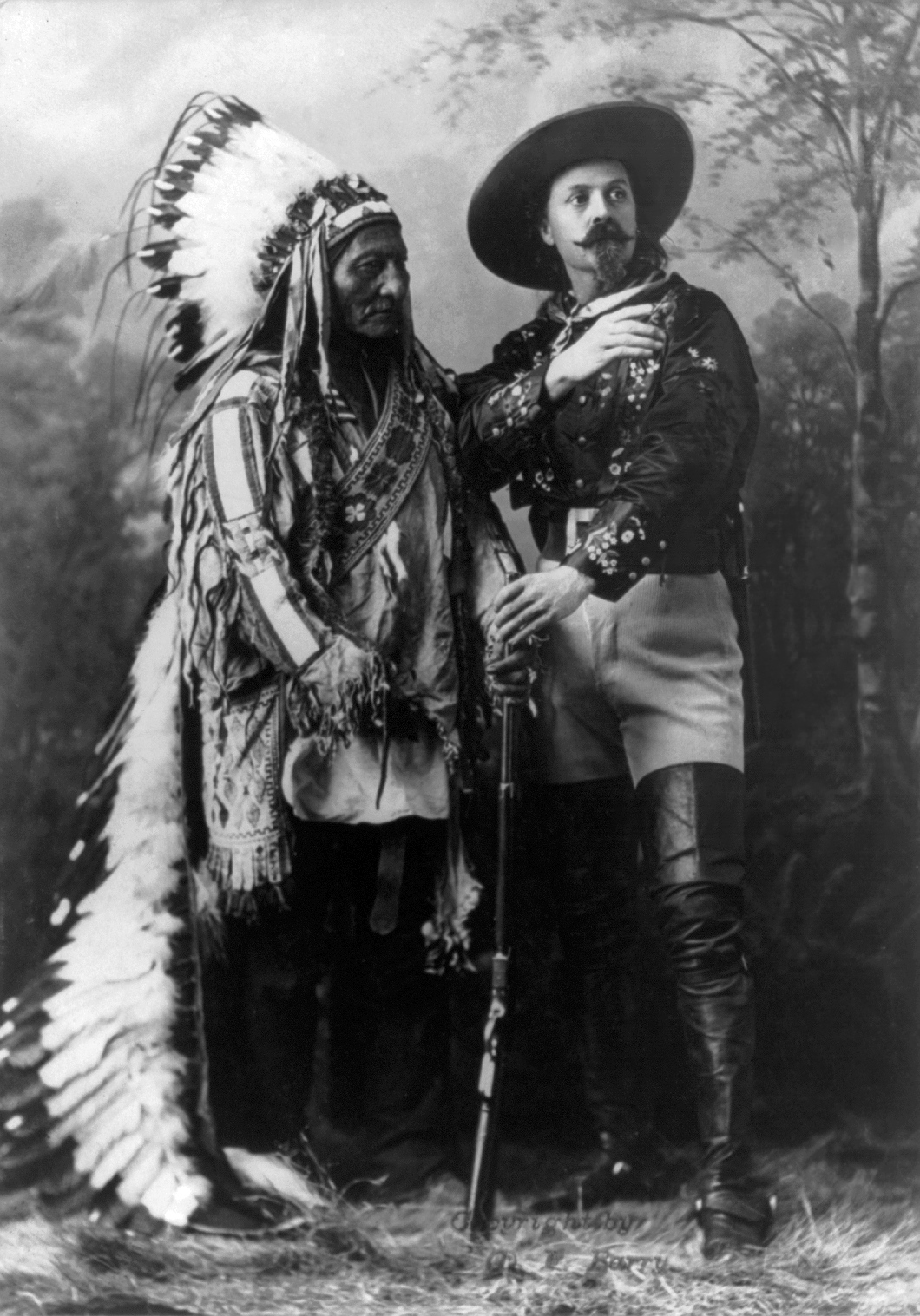
Sitting Bull and Buffalo Bill, in a studio portrait from 1885

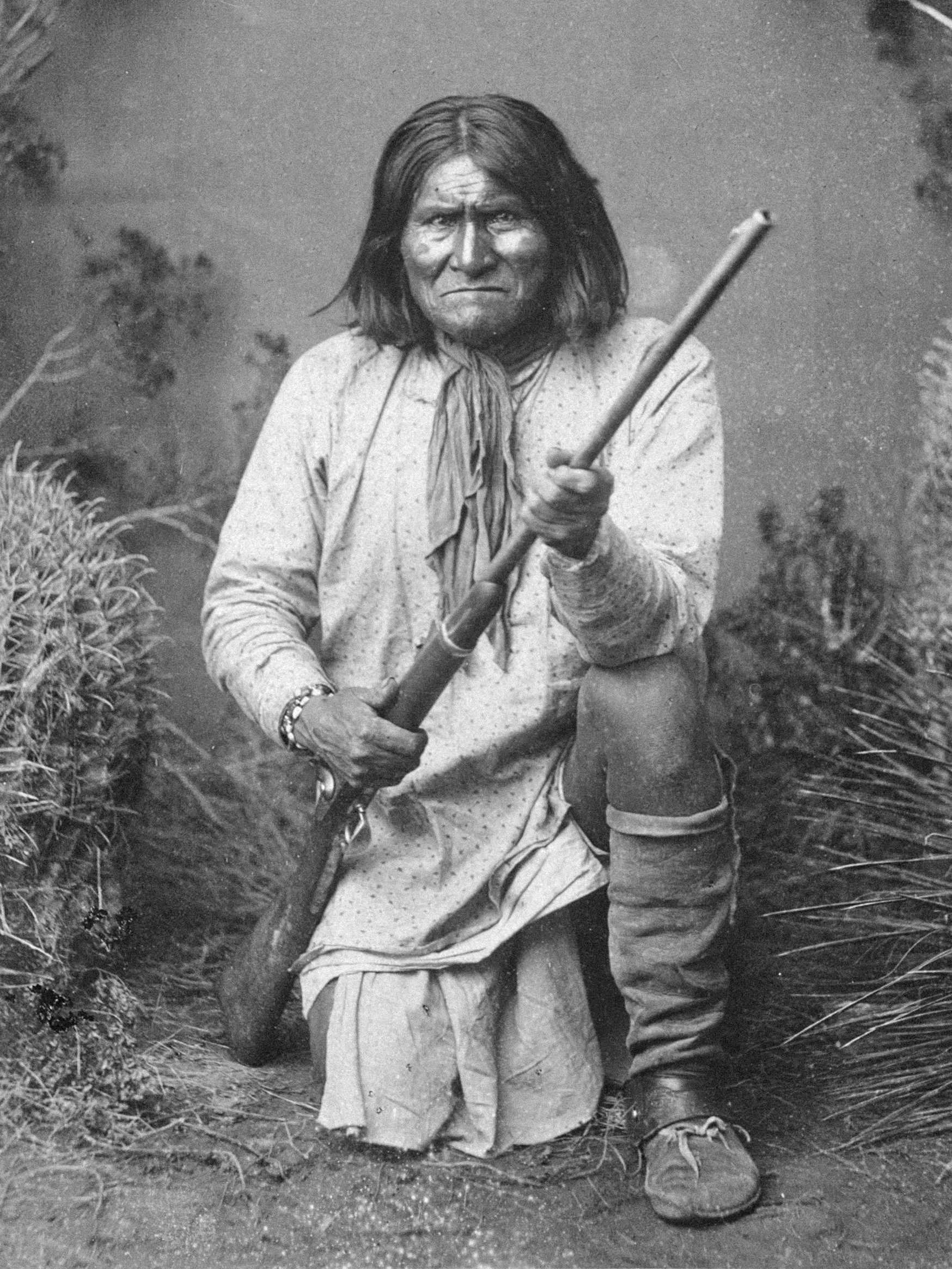
Geronimo, 1887, prominent leader of the Chiricahua Apache

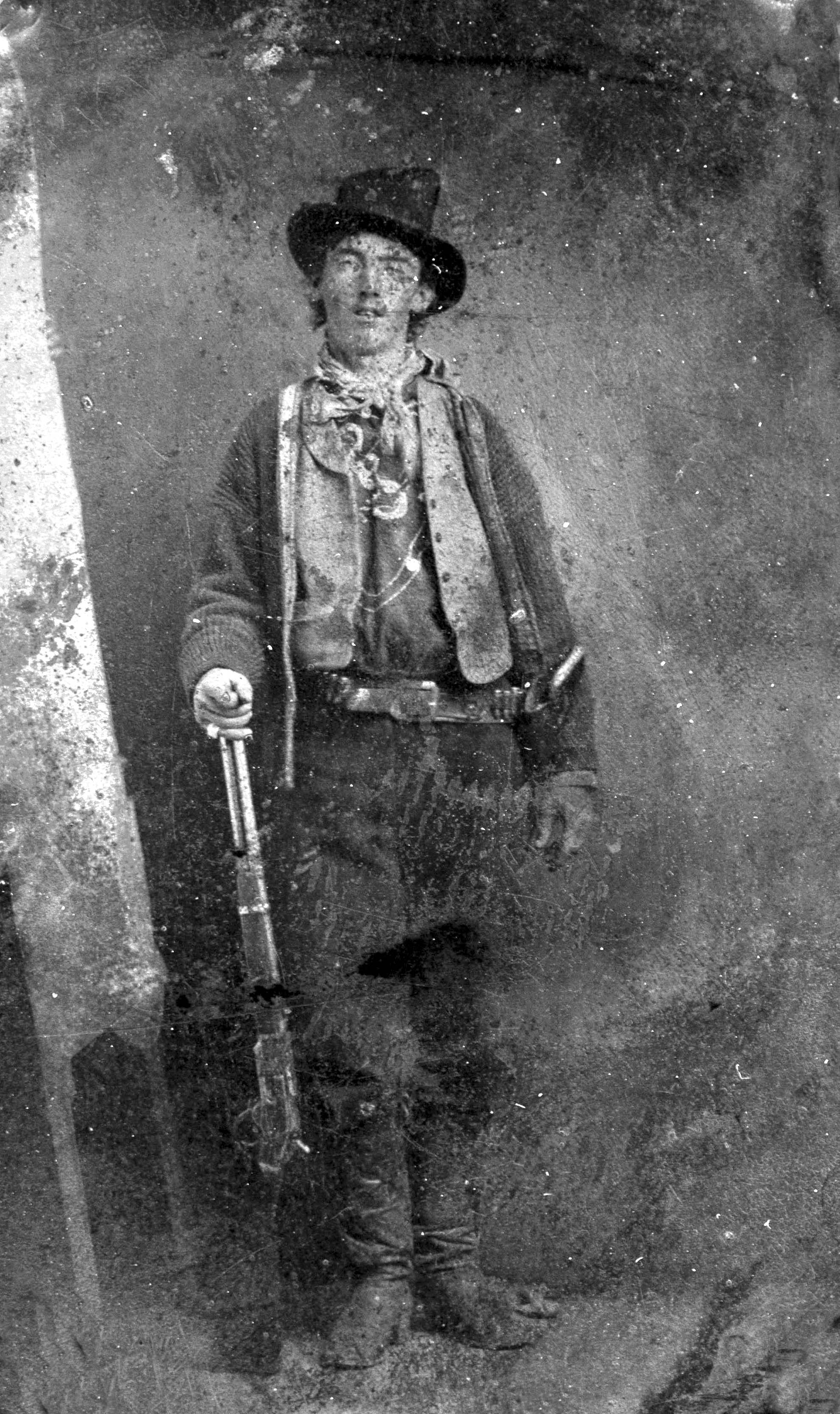
William Bonney aka Henry McCarty aka Billy the Kid, c. late 1870s

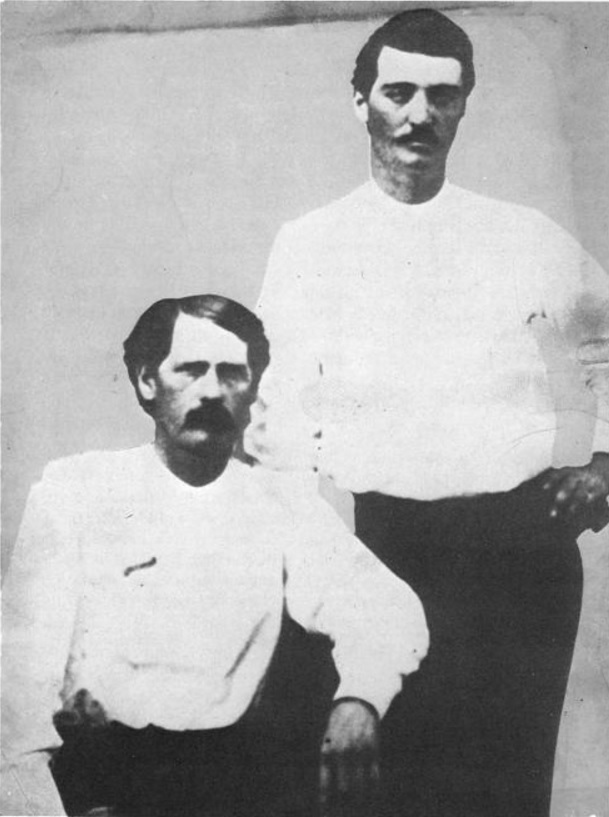
Deputies Bat Masterson and Wyatt Earp in Dodge City, 1876

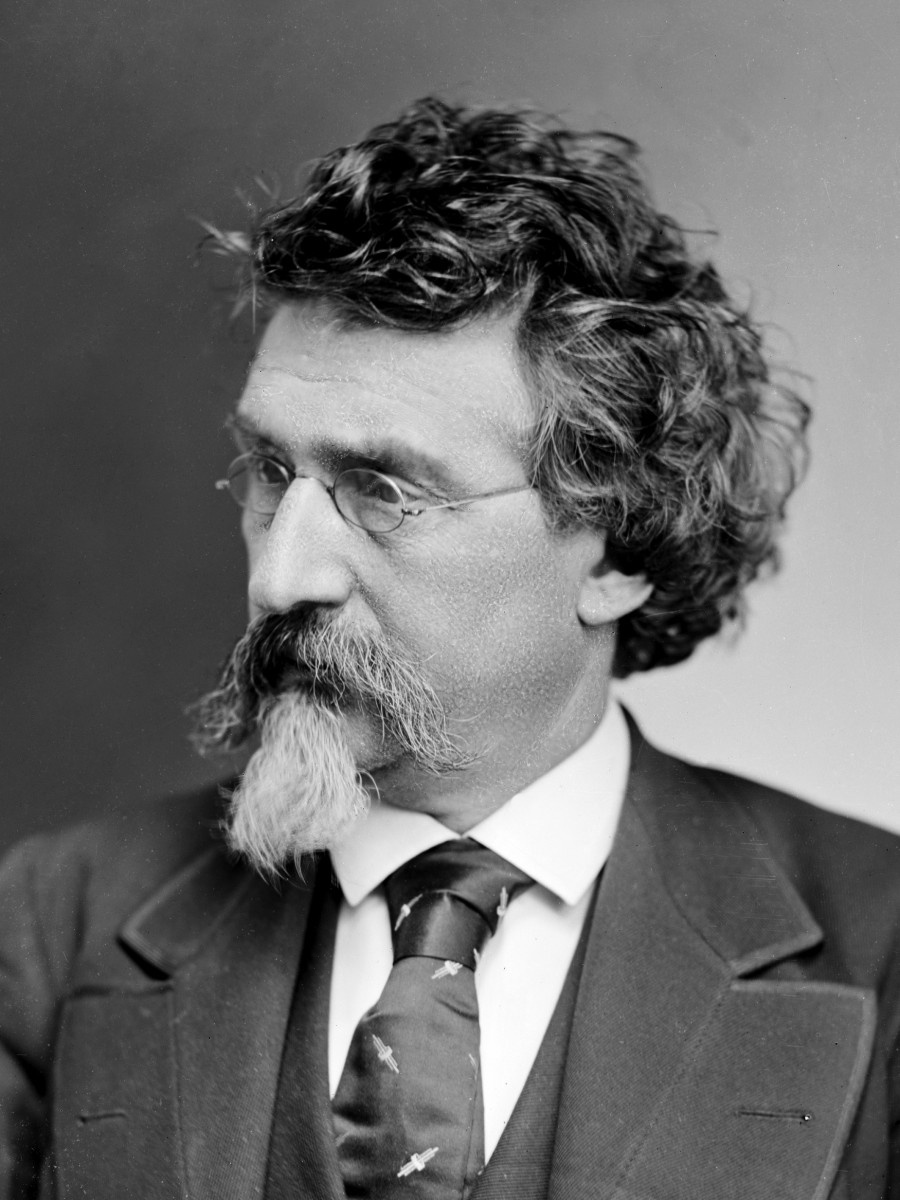
Mathew Brady, self-portrait, c. 1875

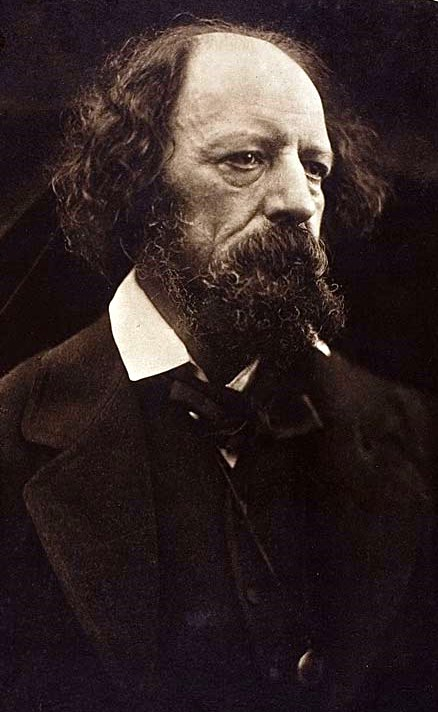
Alfred, Lord Tennyson

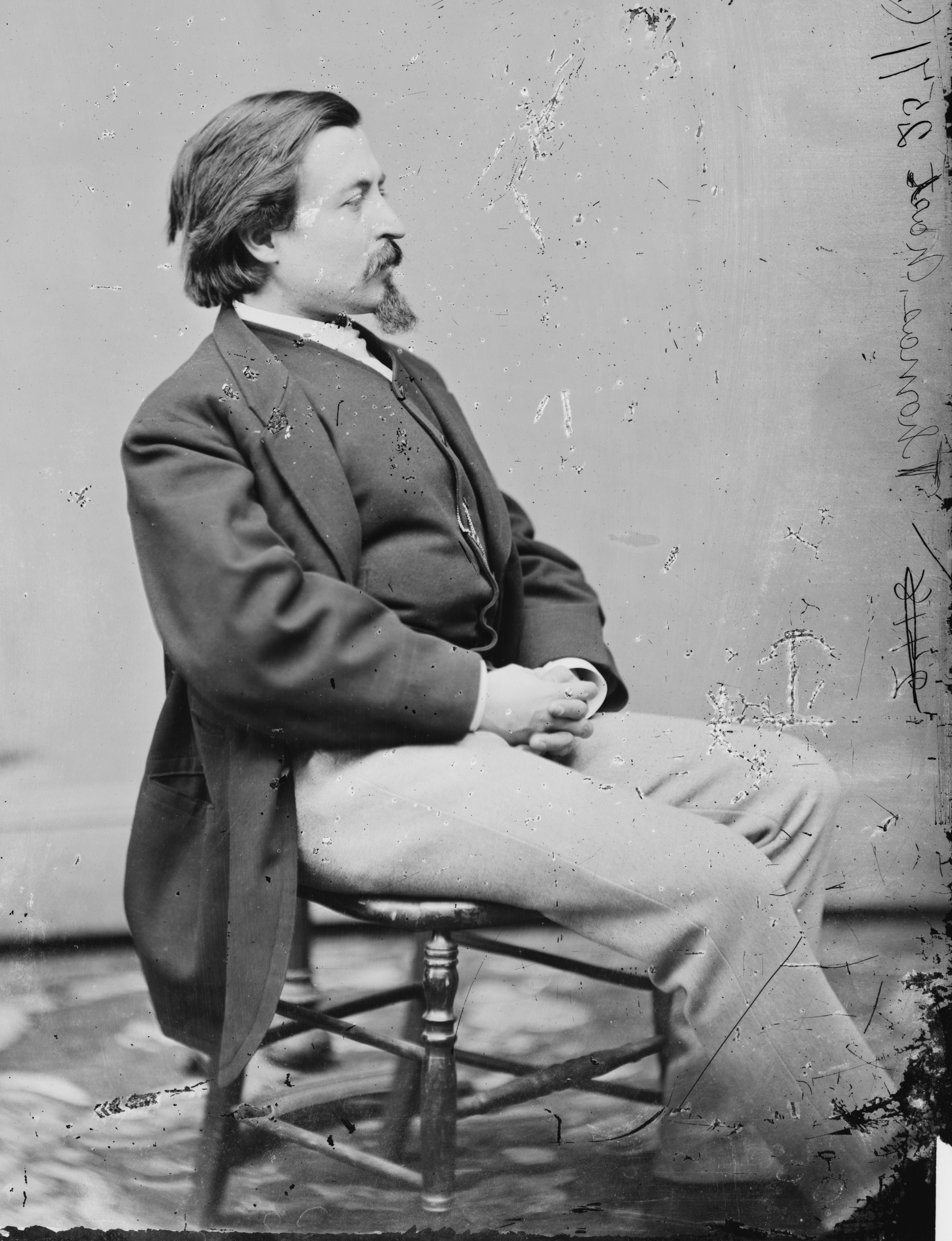
Thomas Nast, c. 1860–1875, photo by Mathew Brady or Levin Handy

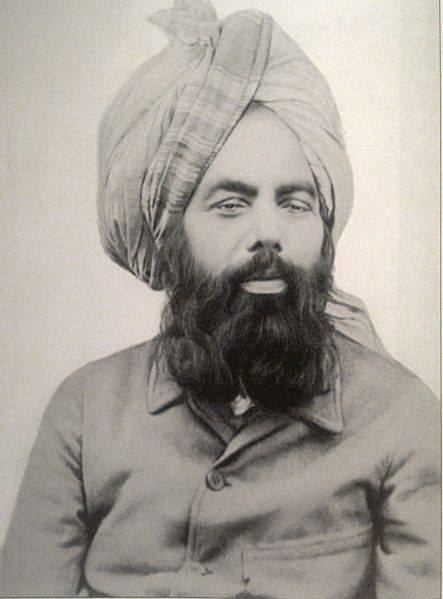
Mirza Ghulam Ahmad

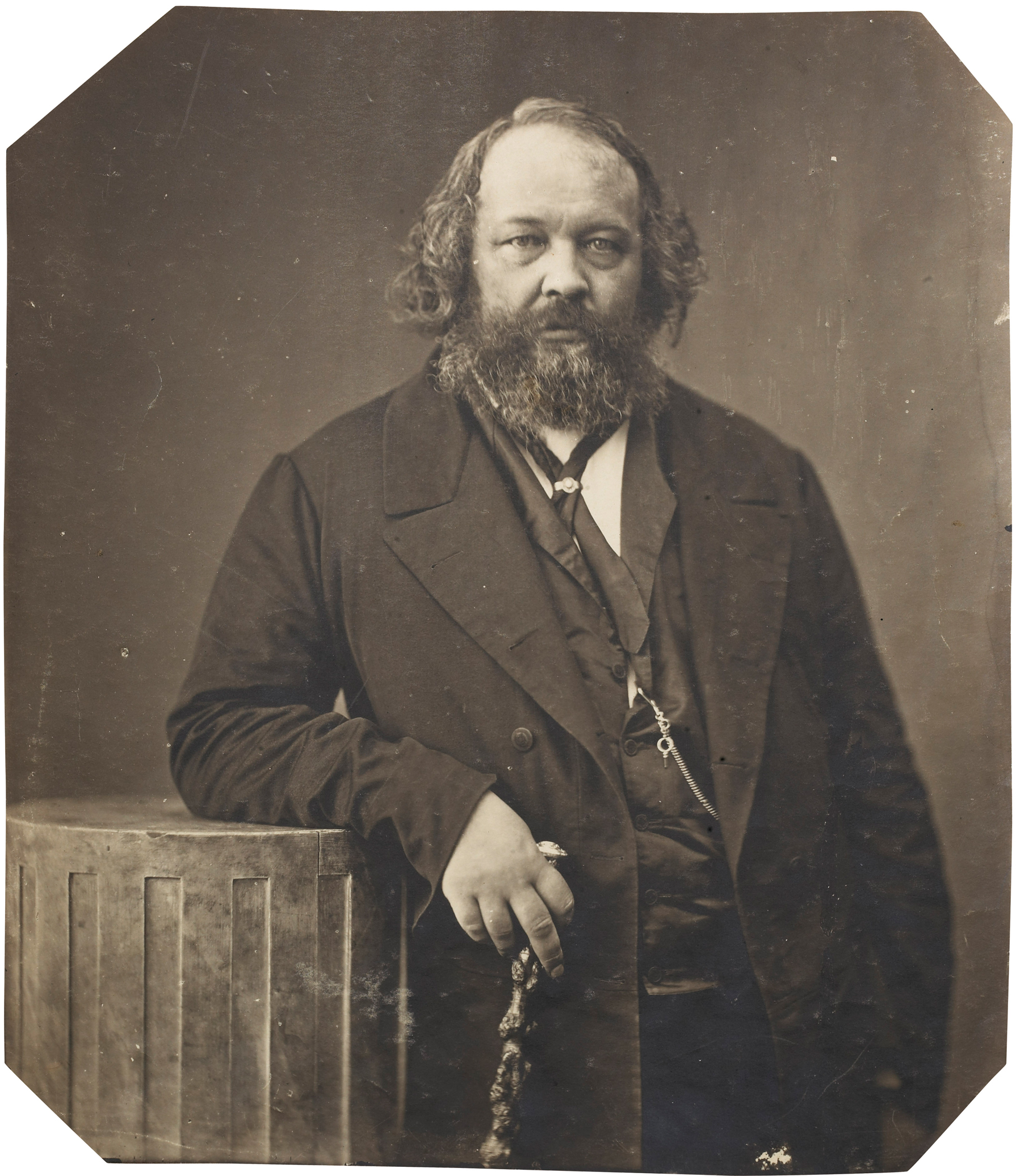
Mikhail Bakunin

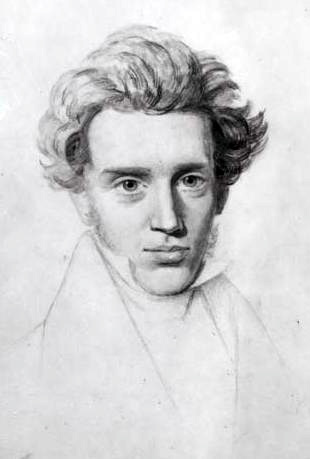
Søren Kierkegaard

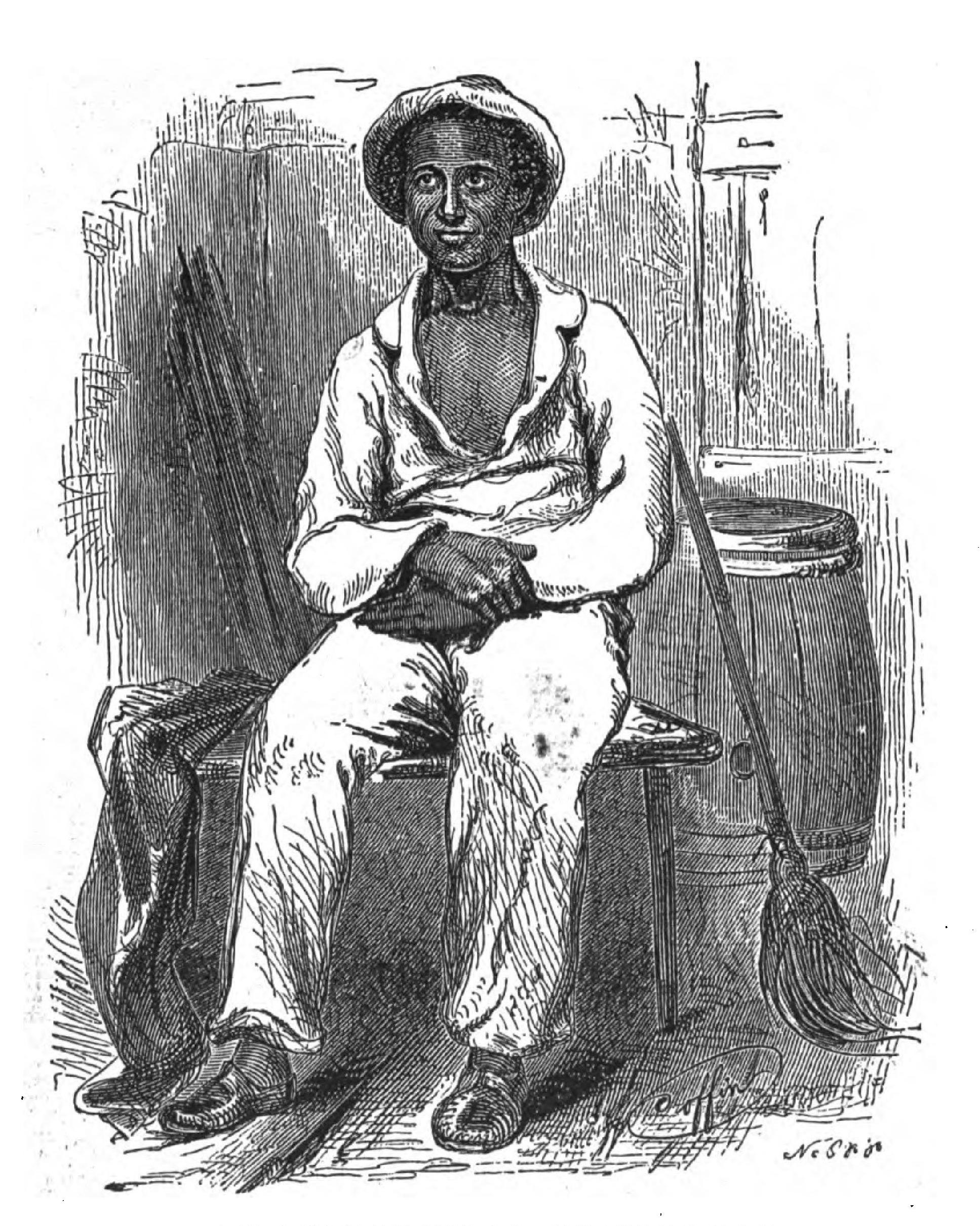
Solomon Northup

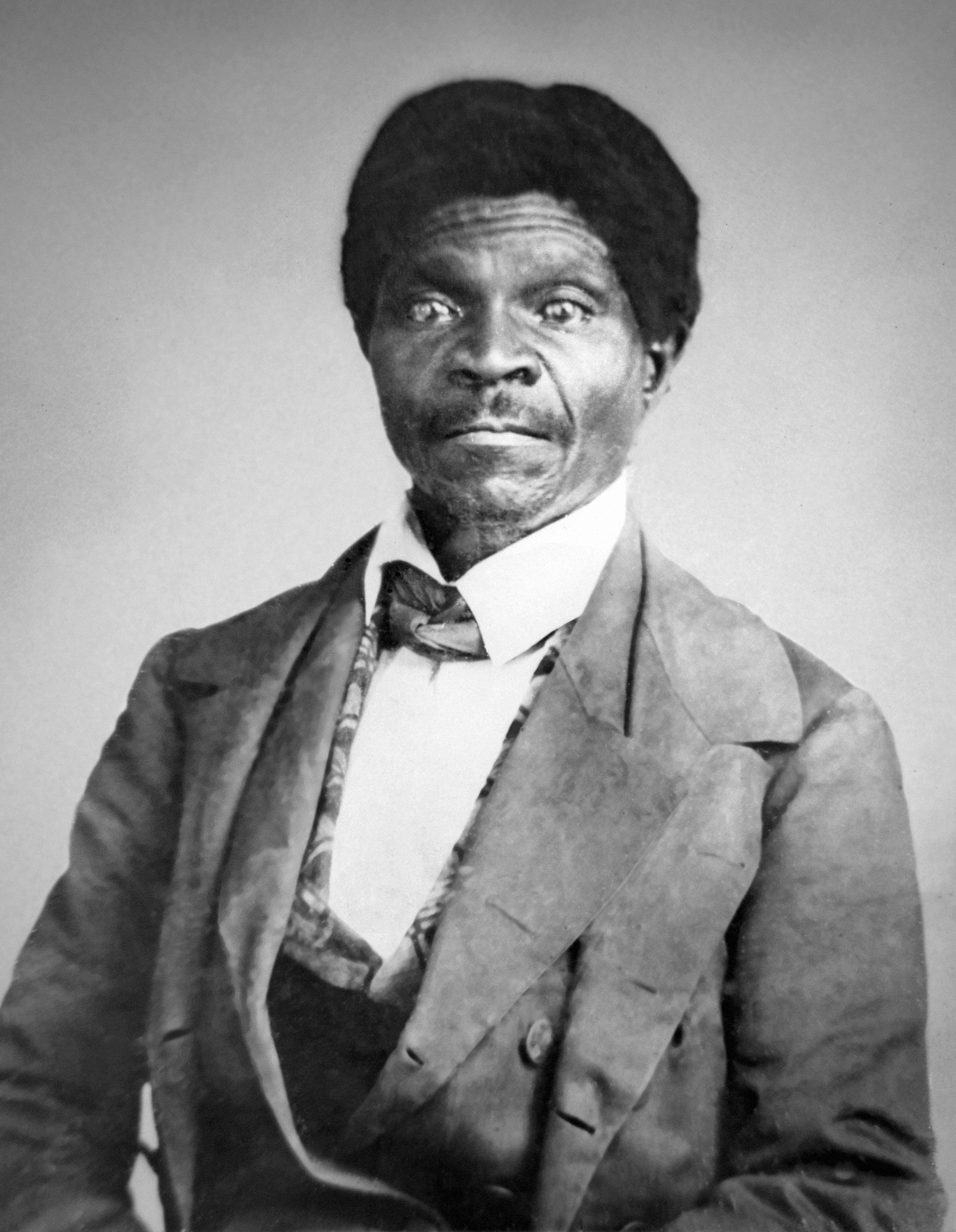
Dred Scott

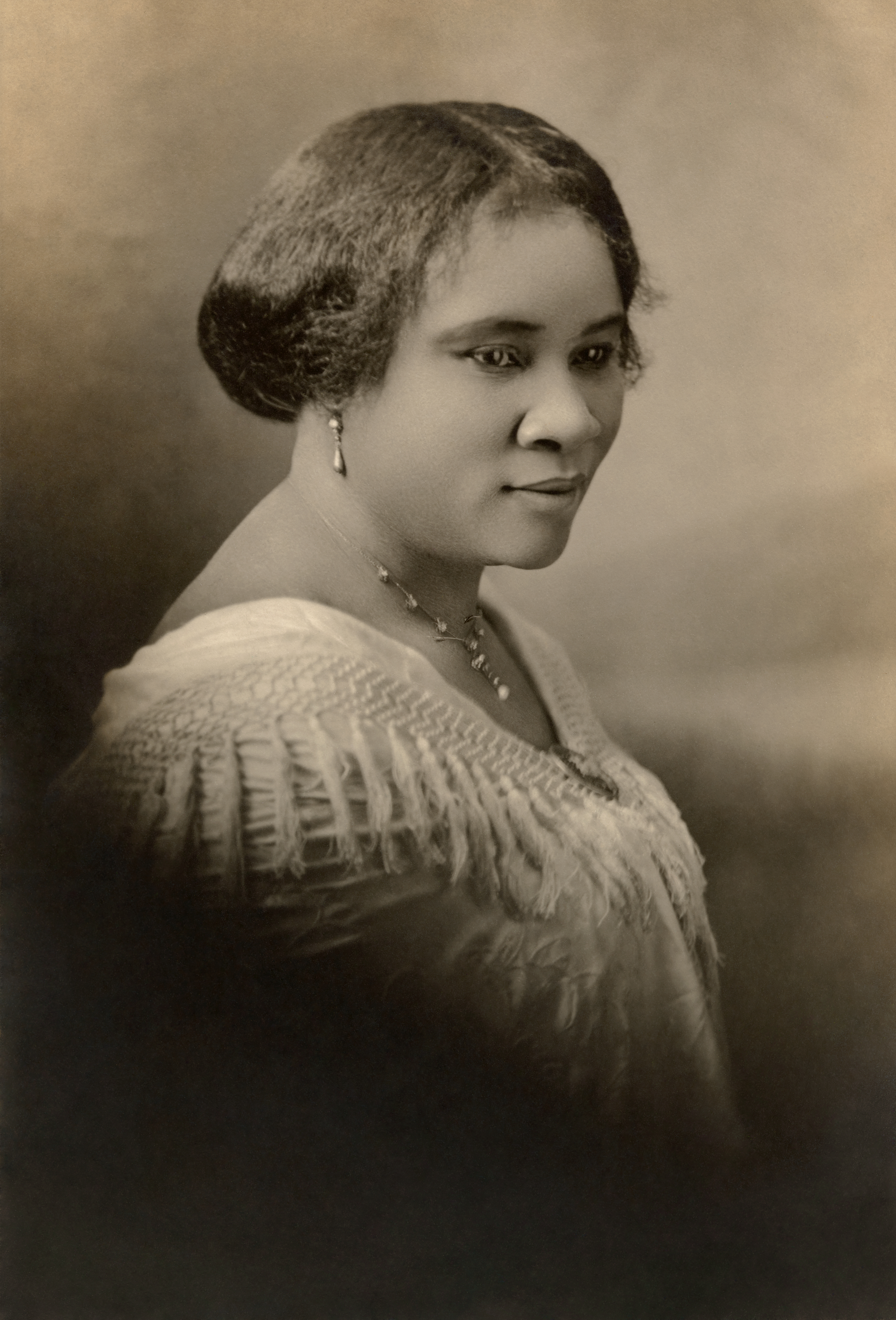
Madam C. J. Walker

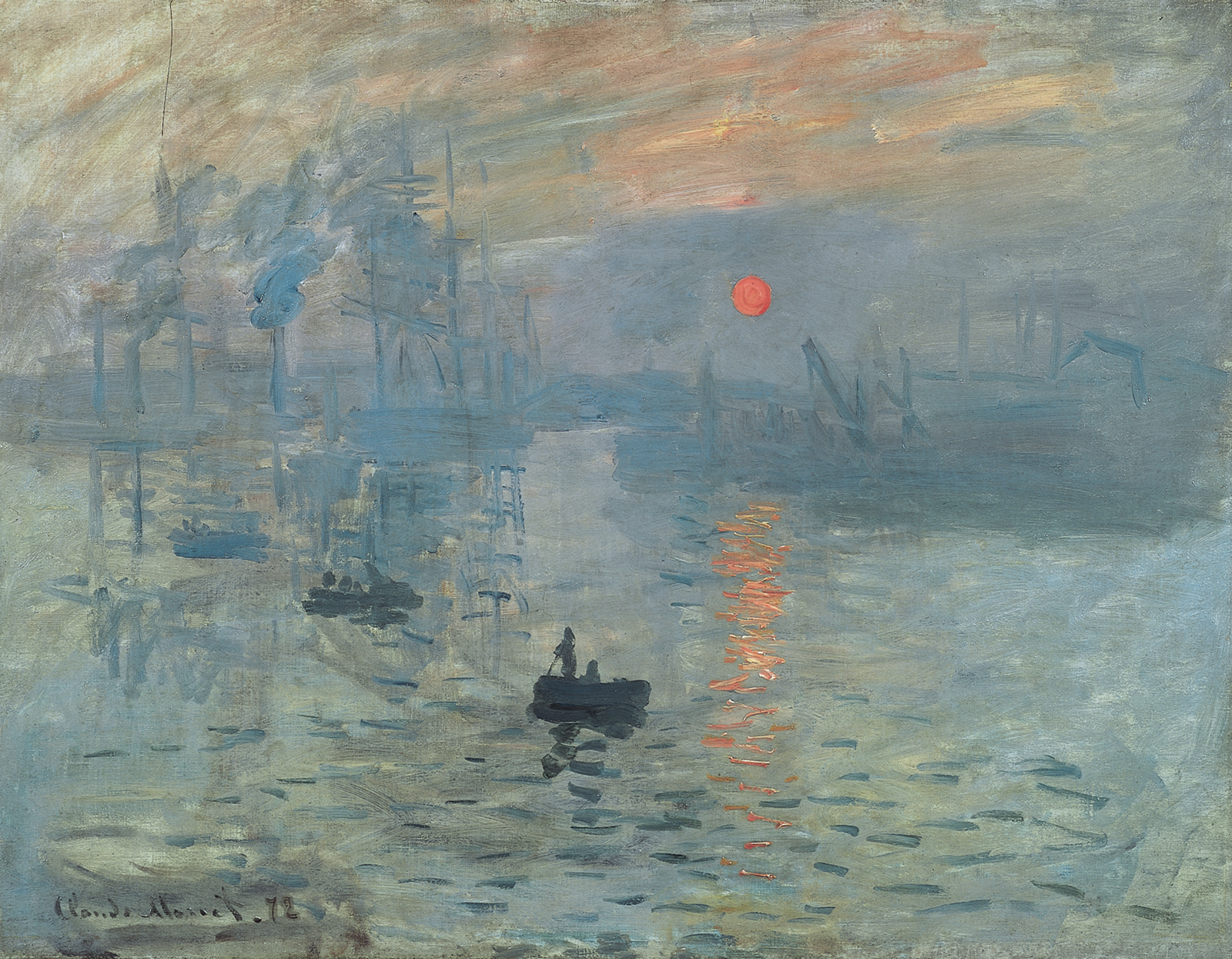
Claude Monet's Impression, Sunrise (1872) gave the name to Impressionism.

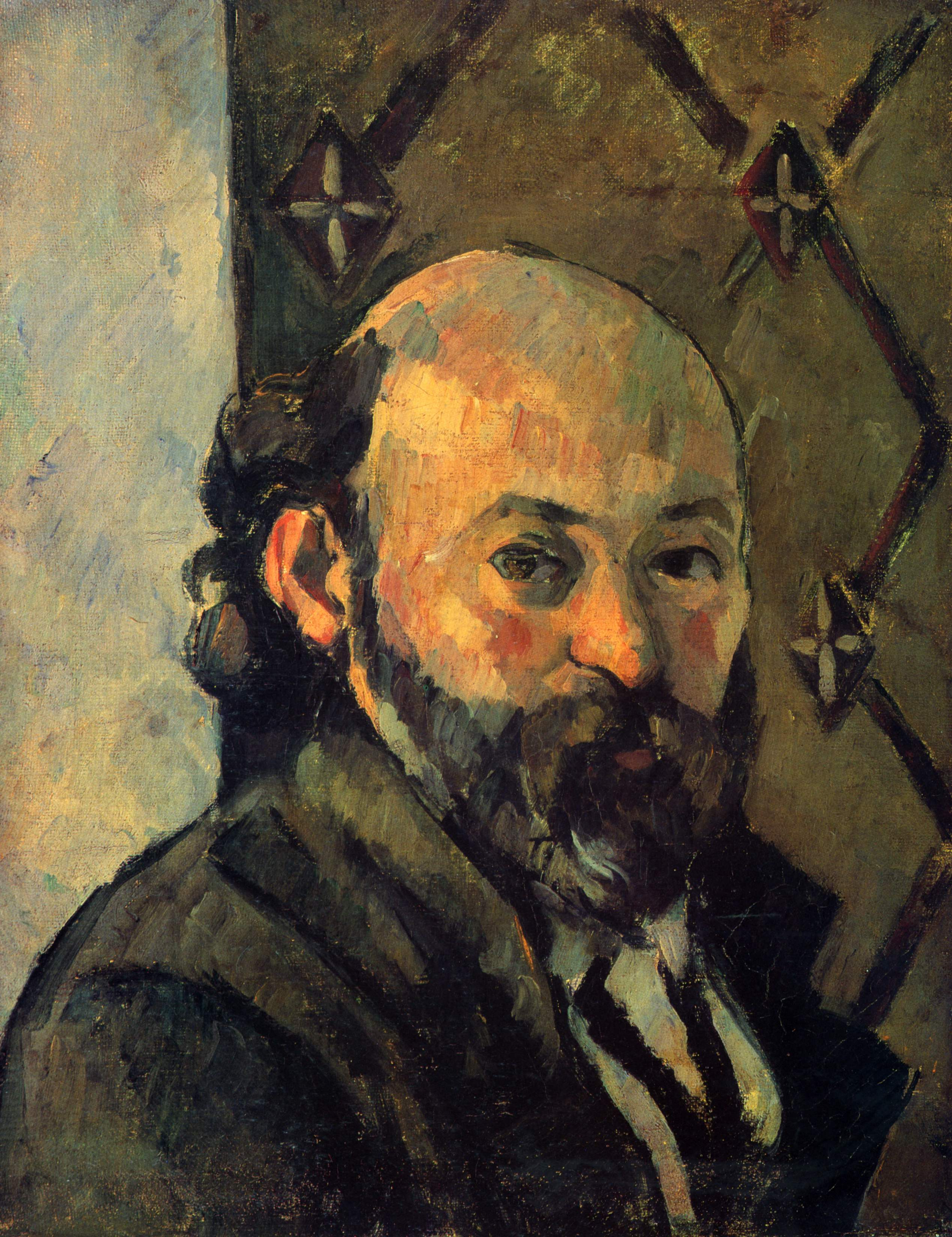
Paul Cézanne, self-portrait, 1880–1881

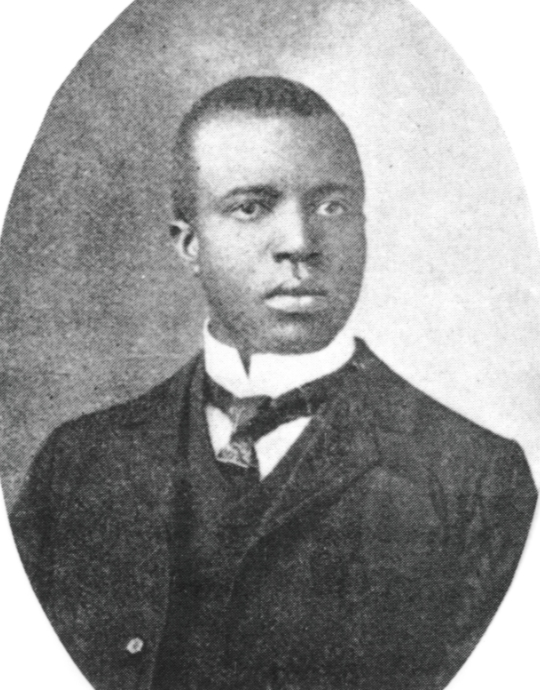
Scott Joplin

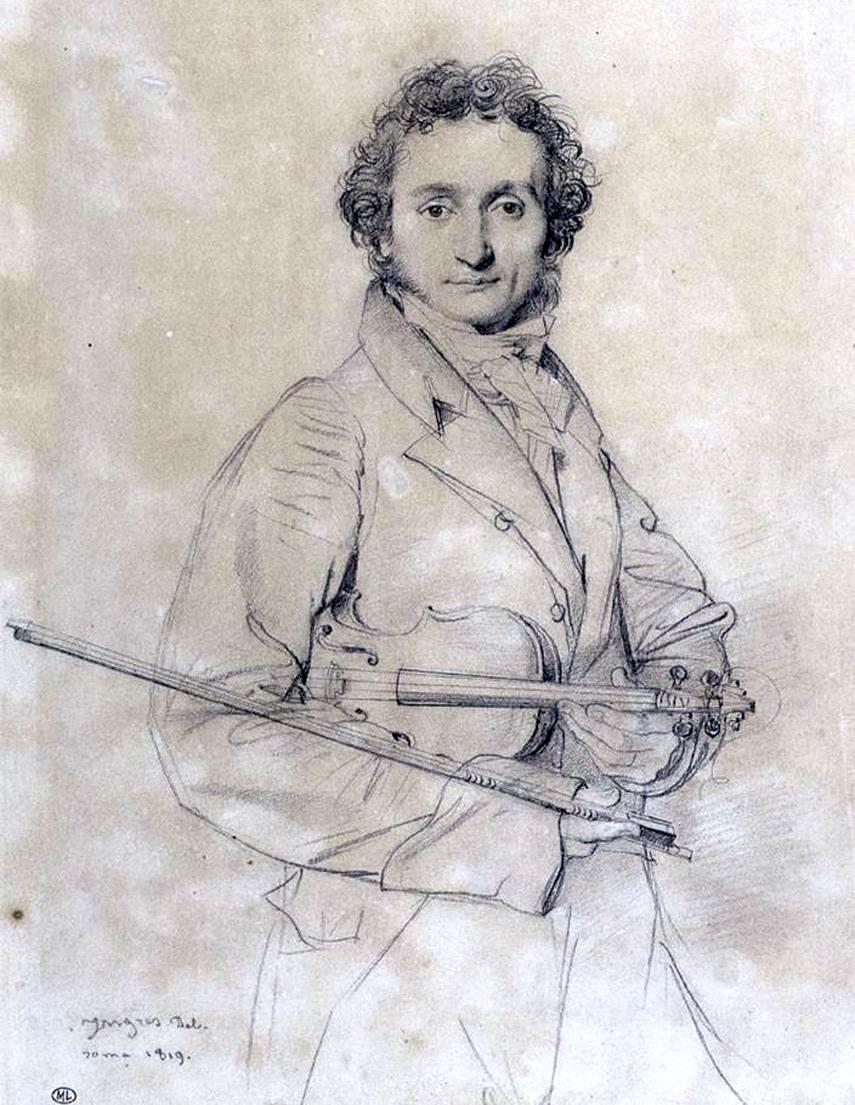
Niccolò Paganini, c. 1819

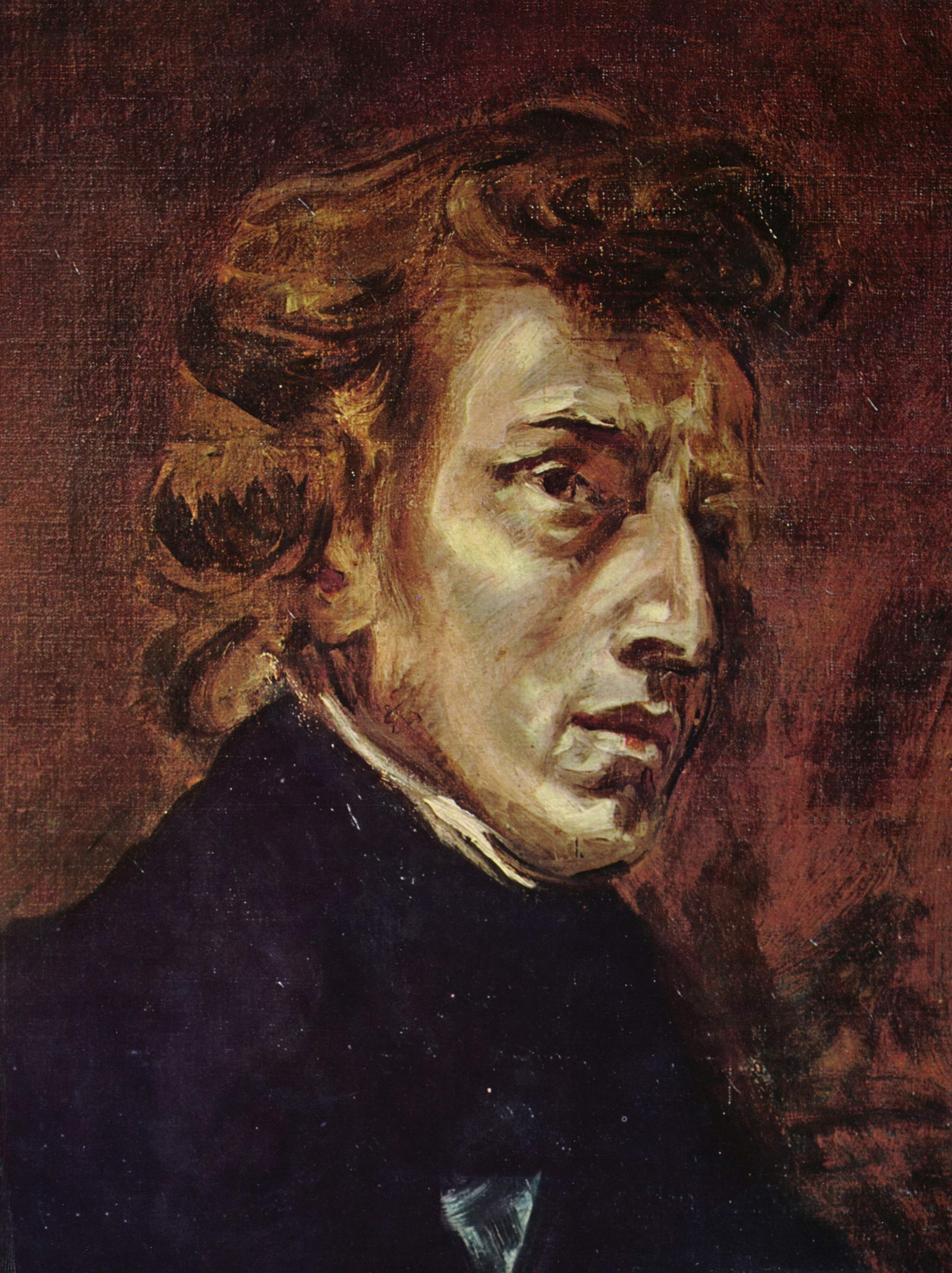
Frédéric Chopin, 1838

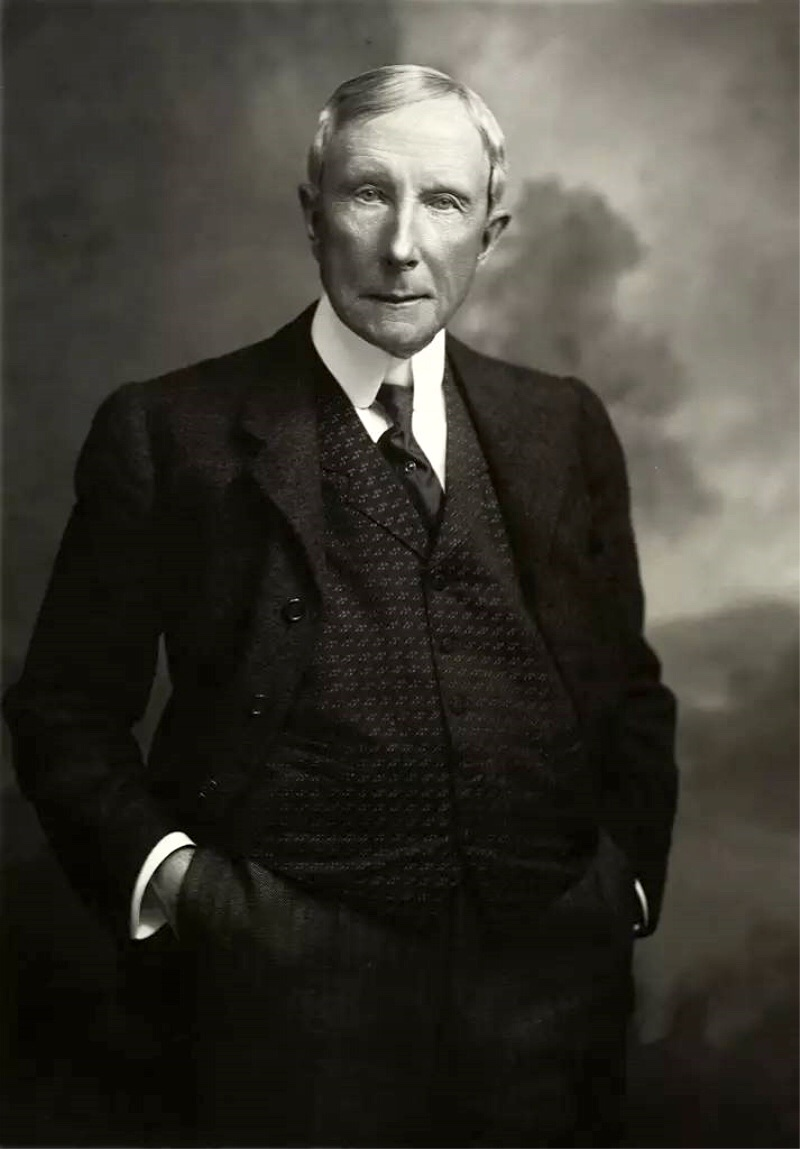
John D. Rockefeller

== See also ==
- Timelines of modern history
- Long nineteenth century
- 19th century in film
- 19th century in games
- 19th-century philosophy
- Nineteenth-century theatre
- International relations (1814–1919)
- List of wars: 1800–1899
- Victorian era
- France in the long nineteenth century
- History of Spain (1808–1874)
- History of Russia (1855–1892)
- Slavery in the United States
- Timeline of 19th-century Muslim history
- Timeline of historic inventions
