= Agerskov =

Agerskov may refer to:

- Agerskov (town), in Southern Jutland, Denmark
- Michael Agerskov (1870–1933), Danish writer; husband of Johanne
- Johanne Agerskov (1873–1946), Danish spiritualist; wife of Michael
