= Toward the Light (disambiguation) =

Toward the Light is a 1920 ethical, philosophical and religious work by Michael Agerskov.

Toward(s) the Light may also refer to:

- Towards the Light (1918 film), a film directed by and starring Henry Edwards
- Towards the Light (1919 film), a Danish silent film
- Towards the Light, a 2006 album by Patrick Hawes
- "Towards the Light", a song by The Boo Radleys from Everything's Alright Forever
- Towards the Light (song), a single by Xu Weizhou
