= Rasmus Malling-Hansen =

Danish inventor

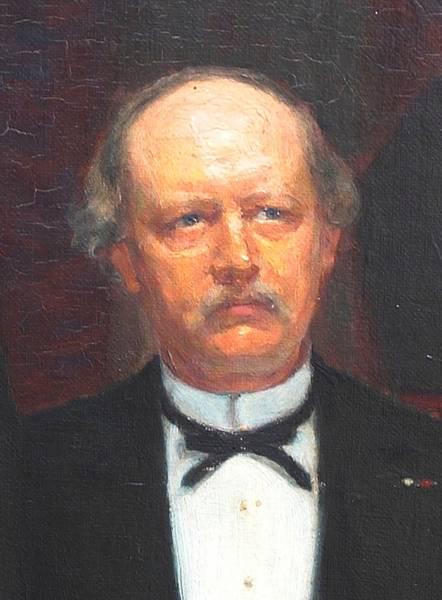
- Rasmus Malling-Hansen, detail from a painting by Malthe Engelsted's painting L'Hombre (1887).
- Born: 5 September 1835; Lolland, Denmark
- Died: 27 September 1890 (aged 55); Copenhagen, Denmark
- Education: University of Copenhagen
- Known for: Hansen Writing Ball
- Awards: Order of Vasa (1876); Order of the Dannebrog (1880)
- Scientific career
- Fields: Priest, inventor, scientist, educator

Signature
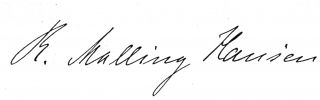

Hans Rasmus Johan Malling-Hansen (5 September 1835 – 27 September 1890) was a Danish inventor, minister and principal at the Royal Institute for the Deaf. He is famous for inventing the first commercially produced typewriter.

== Early career ==
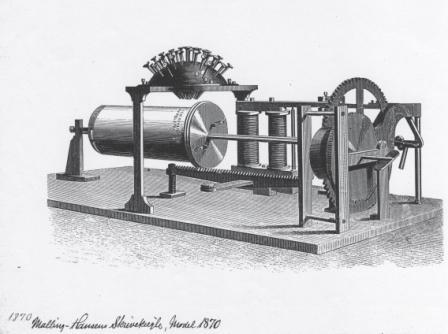
The 1870 Hansen Writing Ball model.

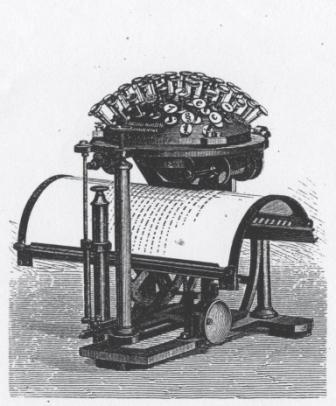
The 1878 model of the writing ball.

Malling-Hansen was born in Hunseby, Lolland in 1835. He invented the Hansen Writing Ball in 1865. In 1874 he patented a new model jointly in which the cylinder was replaced by a flat carriage on which the paper was fastened. In 1875, the original design of the writing ball was replaced with a mechanical frame. With this model, he found a mechanical solution for the movement of the paper, dispensing with the battery. While the writing ball was sold in many countries in Europe, it was an expensive product and achieved little commercial success. The writing ball was successful at different exhibitions, Malling-Hansen and Hall, received the first prize medal at a large industrial exhibition in Copenhagen in 1872, and at the world exhibitions in Vienna in 1873, as well as in Paris in 1878. That year Malling-Hansen developed a fast speed writing machine to be used for stenography, called the Takygraf. Malling-Hansen was also the first person to discover the unique possibilities of blue carbon paper, and developed a copying technique he called the Xerografi. It could, in a relatively short time, produce up to one hundred copies of letters and drawings.

== Education career ==
Malling-Hansen was a principal at the Royal Institute for the Deaf, from 1865 to 1890. Malling-Hansen considered the teaching of the deaf ineffective because of the large variation of the pupils' abilities. Some of them were totally deaf and had no speech ability, and some were mentally challenged. Others had a slight hearing ability and could often also speak. In 1867 Malling-Hansen put forward a proposal to divide the pupils into 3 different groups, depending on their abilities. Malling-Hansen implemented a new pedagogical speech method of reading lips for the group called the not originally deaf; those who had a limited hearing ability and could also speak. The sign method was still used when teaching the group called the originally deaf, those who had no hearing ability and no language, and the mentally challenged. The groups were divided according to each child's ability. The Institute's responsibility was to educate the originally deaf, and the Keller Institutions responsibility was to educate the not originally deaf and the mentally challenged.

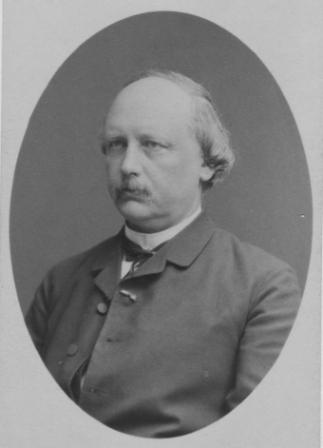
Rasmus Malling-Hansen in 1887.

Malling-Hansen also aimed to improve the living conditions of the deaf-mute students. This was in a very early stage of the educational system, and the understanding of children's needs to play and to relax was not yet developed. Children were required to get up at 5 o'clock in the morning, and in addition to the teaching they had to work in the workshops of the school in late hours. The death rate was high, and in the first period of the Institute, from 1824 until 1839, one-third of all the children died, mostly of lung diseases. Malling-Hansen understood that the main reason for the lung diseases, was the lack of space in the school - there were too many children in a too small area. In response, Malling- Hansen proposed a new building with the installment of electricity, which was refused by the authorities. Malling-Hansen made improvements and enlarged the outside garden. The death rate sunk among the children. In 1879 Malling-Hansen made a proposal to establish a new Institute in Jylland. The plan was approved. In 1881 the Royal Institute for the Deaf-mutes in Fredericia was founded.

Malling-Hansen is regarded as having had a significant impact on the development of the Danish and also the Nordic educational system. He was often used in public committees. In 1890, shortly before his death, he held a lecture about the development of the education of the deaf-mutes at an inter-Nordic conference in Copenhagen. Malling-Hansen died at 55 years old.

== Periods in the Growth of Children ==
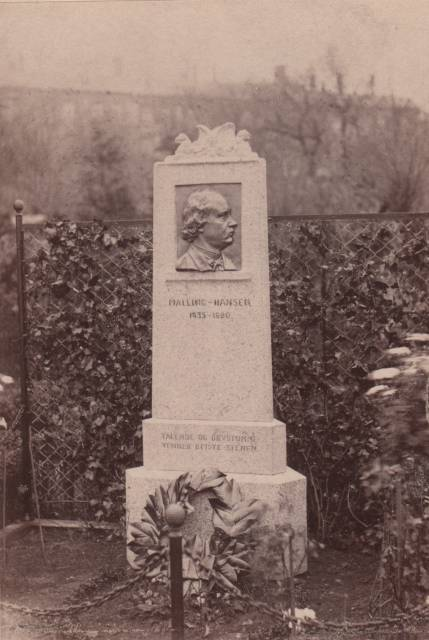
An old picture of Malling-Hansen's tombstone in Garrisons churchyard in Copenhagen. In 1947 the stone was moved to his old school.

Malling-Hansen investigated whether the nourishment of the children was sufficient. The growth and the increase in weight were satisfactory among the children at the Institute. He started a scientific investigation, which included several weighings and measurings of the children's daily height. To shorten the time needed to perform the weighings, Malling-Hansen had some large weights made, where he could weigh up to ten children at a time. The results demonstrated that the growth of the children was not an ongoing process, and the children actually grew in periods. Malling-Hansen saw that the growth was affected by an unknown factor. He found the same factor when measuring trees.

He was in correspondence with other scientists who reported their results from different measuring projects initiated by Malling-Hansen. In 1886, he published a book where he presented the results of his studies. The book was called Perioder i Børns Vækst og i Solens Varme. In the book, he presented the idea that the factor that caused the variations in the growth of the children and in nature was related to the variations in the heat of the sun. His discoveries became internationally recognized, and his book was also translated into German. In 1884 he held a lecture on a scientific conference in Copenhagen, attended by scientists from all over the world.

== Marriages ==
Malling-Hansen was married in 1865 to the daughter of the former principal of the Royal Institute, Cathrine Heiberg, and he became the father of seven daughters. His first wife gave birth to two more daughters in 1876. After she and the twin girls died, Malling-Hansen remarried in 1880, to a woman he knew from his youth, Anna Steenstrup.

One of Malling-Hansen's daughters, Johanne Agerskov, together with her husband, Michael Agerskov, in 1920 published a religious, ethical and philosophical book, called Toward the Light.

== Honours and awards ==
- Knight of the Order of Vasa (Sweden, 1876)
- Knight of the Order of the Dannebrog (Denmark, 1880)
- Medal of Merit in Gold (Denmark, 1872)

== Gallery ==
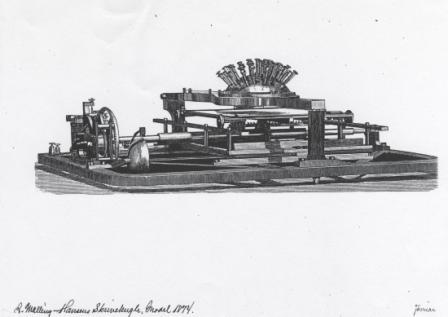
The writing ball 1874 model.

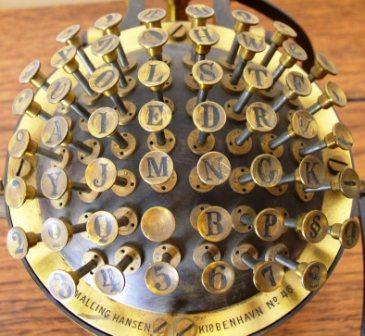
The keyboard of the writing ball.

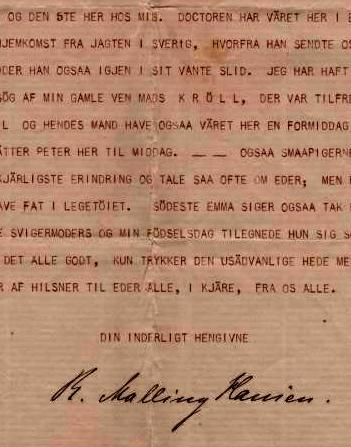
A sample from a letter by Rasmus to his brother Jørgen in 1872 on the writing ball.

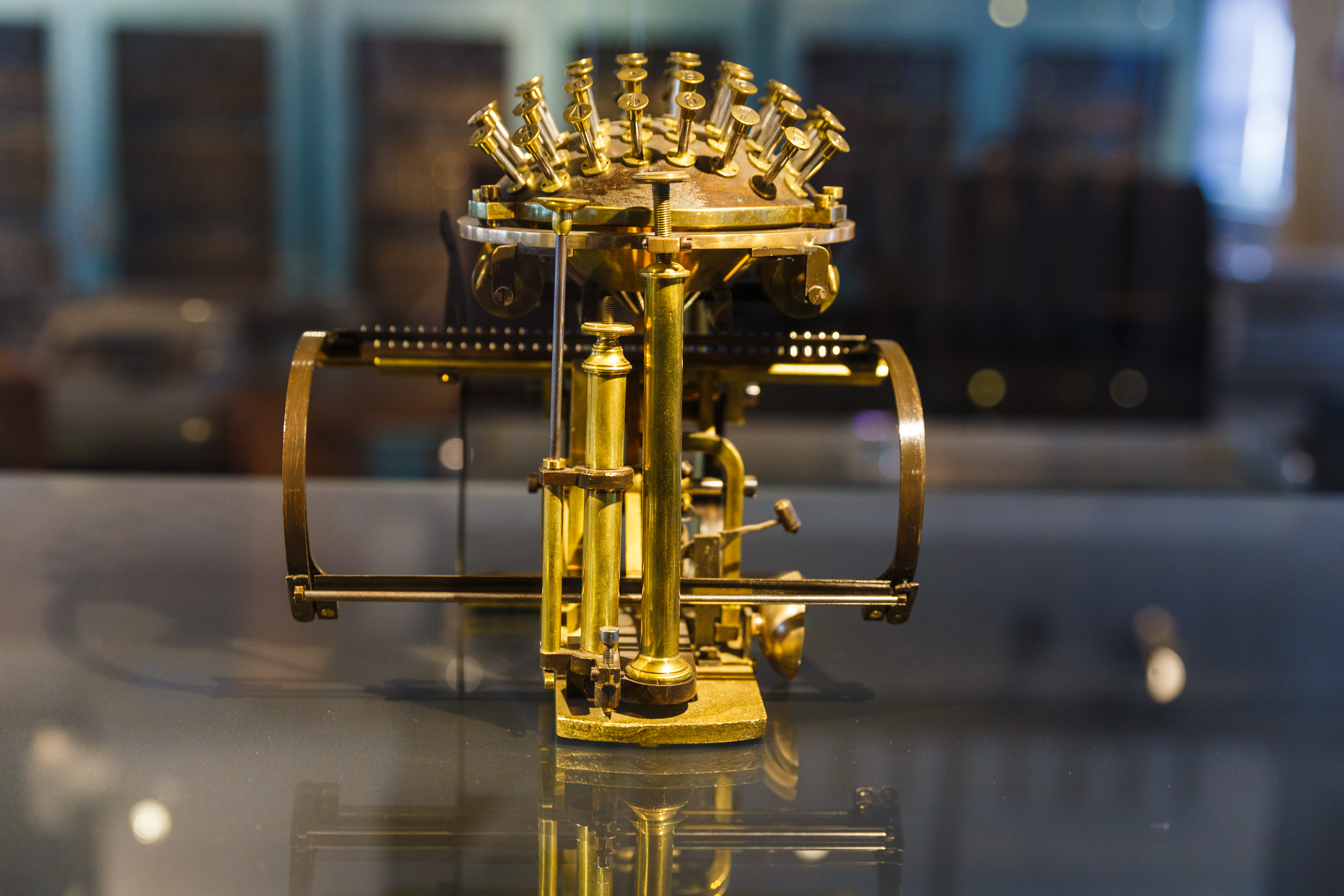
Hansen Writing Ball in Technischen Sammlungen Dresden

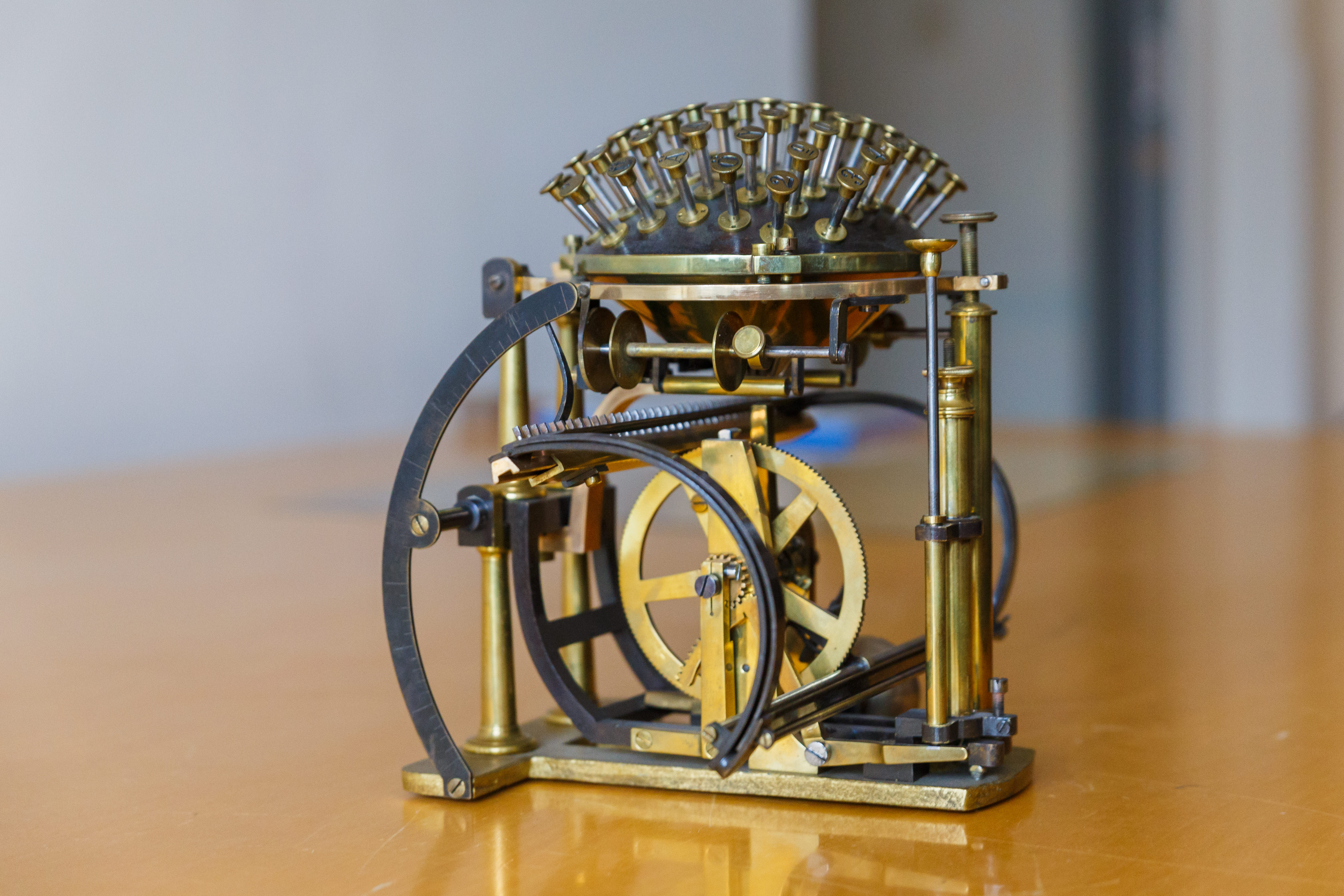
Hansen Writing Ball in Technischen Sammlungen Dresden
