= Toward the Light =

1920 Danish book by Michael Agerskov

Toward the Light (in Danish: Vandrer mod Lyset!) is a book that was first published in Copenhagen, Denmark, in 1920 by the Danish author Michael Agerskov. The content of the book is said to have been received through intuitive thought-inspiration from the transcendental world by Michael Agerskov's wife, Johanne Agerskov, who was an intermediary. Johanne Agerskov was the daughter of the Danish inventor Rasmus Malling-Hansen.

== Inspirations ==
According to them, the couple were inspired by intelligences in the transcendental world. Johanne Agerskov became a mediator. The Agerskovs, together with two other couples, claimed they have had spiritual contact with spirits of the Light during light time séances.

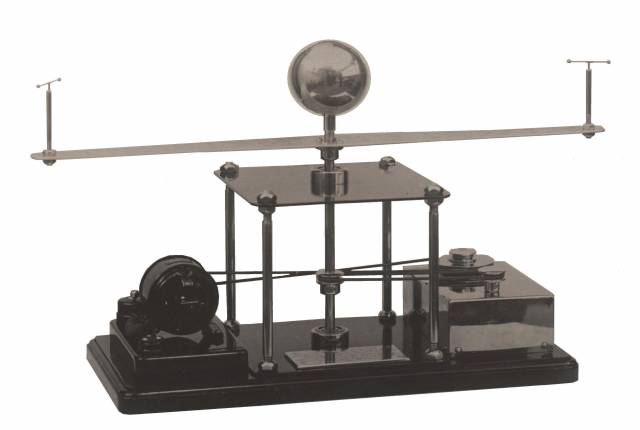
This model of the universe, based upon the information given in Toward the Light!, was made by A. Andér. In the middle is the kingdom of God, and the four small balls rotating around it are the mother suns.

In 1922, Michael Agerskov wrote the story about the events that had led to the creation of the "three fruits" in his book, Some Psychic Experiences. In 1938, a letter was sent to all the bishops of Denmark urging the church authorities in Denmark to communicate about God to their congregations and to the public at large.

== Content ==
The first "golden fruit" is a collection of poems written by Danish poets. The book of poems was published by Michael Agerskov in 1915, with the title Hilsen til Danmark (Greetings to Denmark).

The second "golden fruit" was a religious work called Toward the Light, published in 1920. This book was supposedly the result of séances during 1913–1918. The content is divided into several parts. In Ardor's Account, the spirit formerly known as Lucifer, tells about the two primeval powers of the universe, the Light and the Darkness. In the Light rested the possibilities of the good, and in the Darkness rested the possibilities of evil. Ardor tells how God and His 12 servants arose from the Light, then God created the Earth.

God's angels went to their own planet, not being aware that they had fallen into Darkness. The fallen angels, called "the Eldest", created the first man and hoped that they would be able to control the Darkness. When the humans died, their spirits arose from their bodies, but the Eldest had not been able to give them thought and a will; they are still alive, but still without consciousness. These 'zombies' eventually outnumbered the living humans. God gave all the dead spirits wills and thoughts. God later tasked the angels who had remained in his kingdom; the angels who took on the task became the leader of the Youngest. The Eldest decided to work against the Youngest. The leader of the Youngest, who worked with God, was Christ; and the leader of the Eldest, the prince of the darkness, became known as the Devil.

The third "golden fruit" was a book called The Doctrine of Atonement and the Shorter Road. In this book, it was written that the spirit that was incarnated as Saul of Tarsus (later, Paul) seeks to dispel the dogma he created as Paul. This spirit said that it was never Jesus's nor the Father's intention to die in order to save human and fallen spirits. It was written that Christ spent the next 2000 years (until 1912) pursuing his brother. It is stated that Jesus died because people's sin put him up to death. The last part is the account of another spirit, who once was incarnated as Ignatius Loyola.
