= Hansen Writing Ball =

First commercially produced typewriter

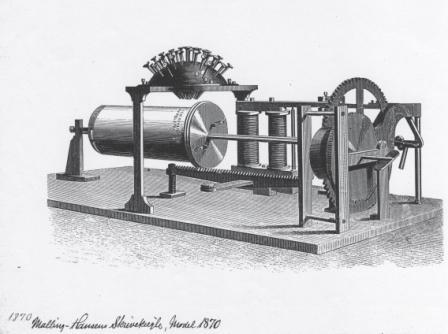
Model from 1870

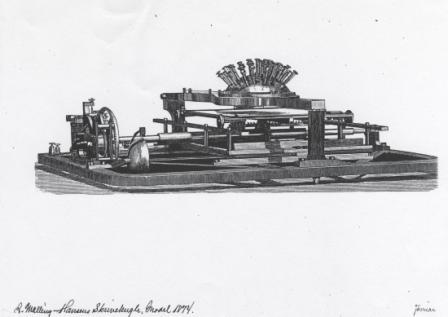
Model from 1874

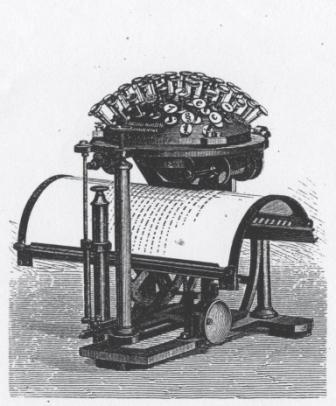
Model from 1878

The Hansen Writing Ball is an early typewriter. It was invented in 1865 and patented and put into production in 1870, and was the first commercially produced typewriter.

== Design ==
The writing ball (Danish: skrivekugle) was invented in 1865 by the reverend Rasmus Malling-Hansen (1835–1890) principal of the Royal Institute for the Deaf-Mutes in Copenhagen.

The Hansen ball was a combination of unusual design and ergonomic innovations: its distinctive feature was an arrangement of 52 keys on a large brass hemisphere, causing the machine to resemble an oversized pincushion. Hvem er Skrivekuglens Opfinder, written by Malling-Hansen's daughter Johanne Agerskov, describes Malling-Hansen's experiments with a model of his writing ball made out of porcelain. He tried out different placements of the letters on the keys, to work out the placement that led to the quickest writing speed. He ended up placing the most frequently used letters to be touched by the fastest writing fingers, and also placed most of the vowels to the left and the consonants to the right. This, together with the short pistons which went directly through the ball, made the writing speed of the writing ball very fast.

Like most of the early 19th-century typewriters, it did not allow the paper to be seen as it passed through the device.

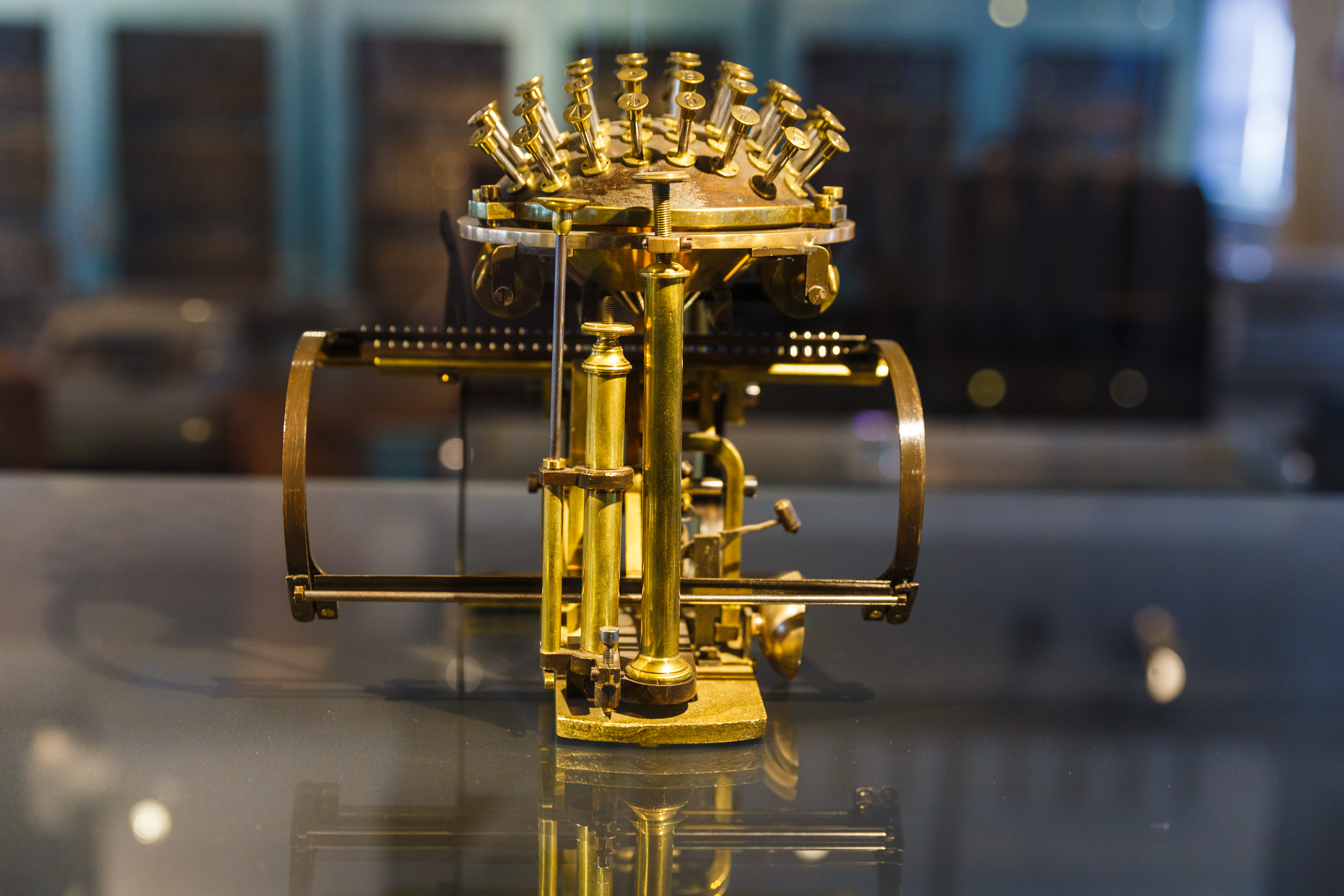
Hansen Writing Ball in Technische Sammlungen Dresden

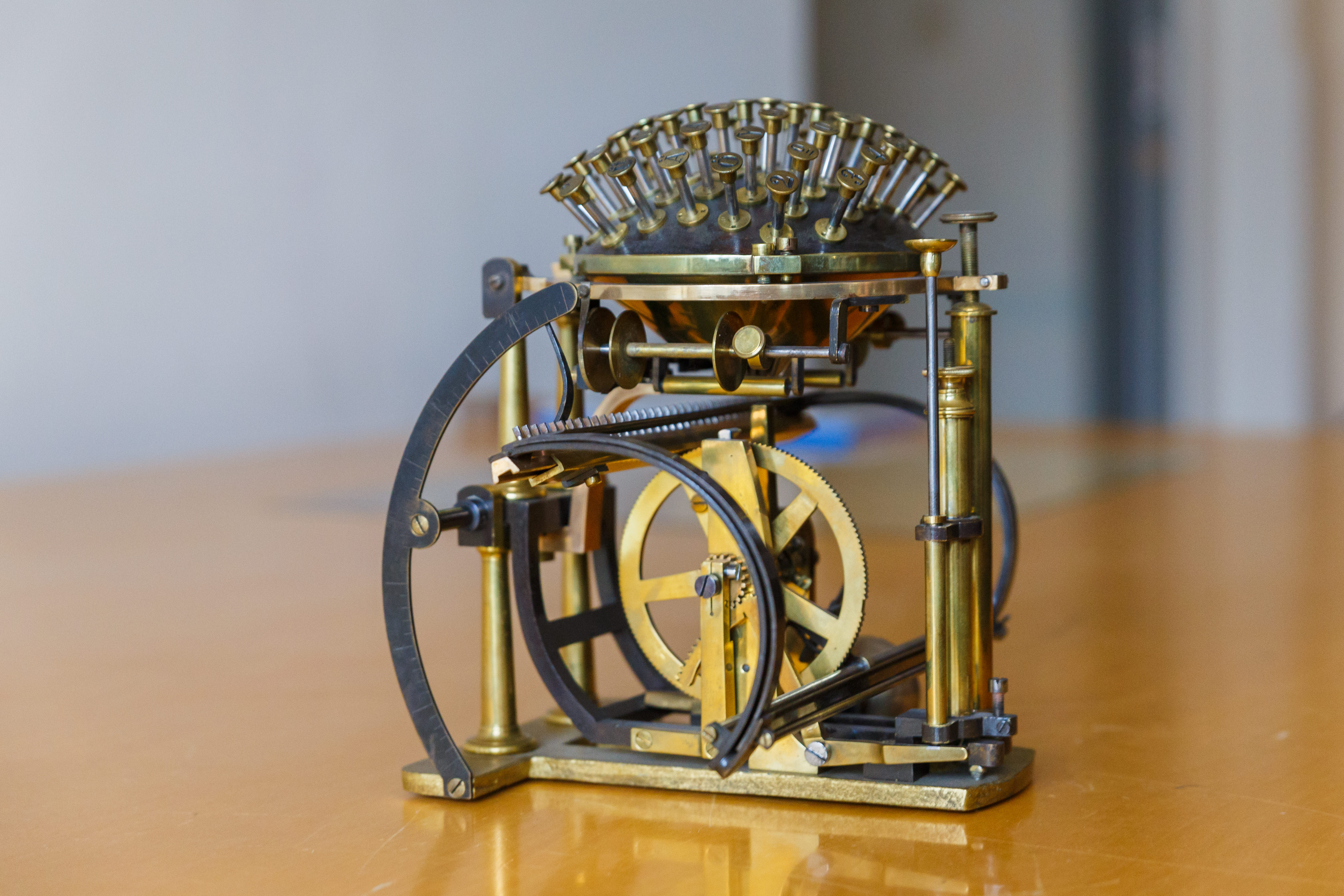
Hansen Writing Ball in Technische Sammlungen Dresden

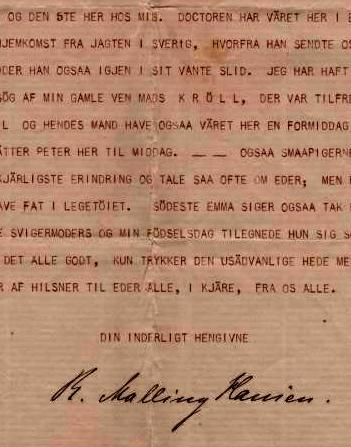
A sample from a letter written by Rasmus Malling-Hansen in 1872 to his brother Jørgen on the writing ball

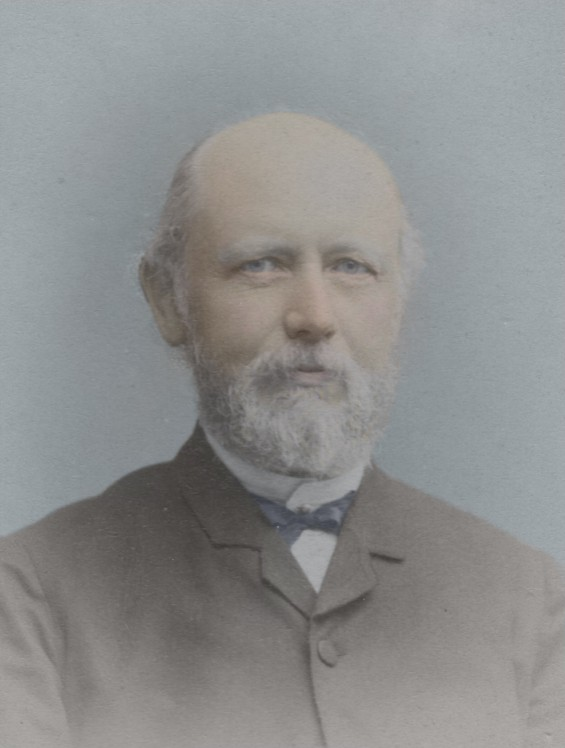
Rasmus Malling-Hansen in 1890

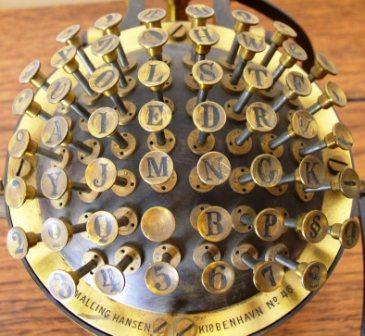
The keyboard of the writing ball

=== Early designs ===
The first models typed on a paper attached to a cylinder, which could be made to move both rotationally with the cylinder and longitudinally along the cylinder, enabling the user to format and space the letters manually. The user would attach a piece of white paper and a sheet of coloring paper onto the cylinder by way of several clips. These models also included an electro-magnet for the Ball which controlled both the typewriter's movement and manipulation, thus making Malling-Hansen's machine the first electric typewriter. This electro-magnet was powered by a 10 or 12-cell battery, and controlled a mechanical escapement in the typewriter's clockwork, moving the carriage a fixed amount each time one of the pistons was depressed.

=== Improvements ===
Malling-Hansen made several improvements on his invention throughout the 1870s and 1880s, and in 1874 he patented the next model, and now the cylinder was replaced by a flat mechanical paper-frame. The electromagnetic battery was still used to move the paper along as the Ball typed upon it, and the design led to a lower possibility for error. Malling-Hansen improved further on his design, and created a semi-cylindrical frame to hold one sheet of paper. This best known model was first patented in 1875, and now the battery was replaced by a mechanical escapement. All these improvements made for a simpler and more compact writing apparatus.

== Sale and popular use ==
It was exhibited at a great industrial exhibition in Copenhagen in 1873, at the world exhibition in Vienna in 1873, and at the Paris exhibition or Exposition Universelle. All through the 1870s it won several awards.

The writing ball was sold in many countries in Europe, and it is known that it was still in use in offices in London as late as 1909. But due to its hand-crafted production, it was overtaken in the market by the mass-produced Sholes and Glidden typewriter which E. Remington and Sons started to make in 1873.

Malling-Hansen also invented a very high speed writing machine for stenography, called the Takygraf, and a copying technique called the Xerografi—both invented in 1872.

More-or-less intact Hansen balls have fetched hundreds of thousands of Euros in auctions. Few remain in existence today.

In 1881, when he had serious problems with his sight, Friedrich Nietzsche wanted to buy a typewriter to enable him to continue his writing, and from letters to his sister it is known that he personally was in contact with "the inventor of the typewriter, Mr Malling-Hansen from Copenhagen". He mentioned to his sister that he had received letters and also a typewritten postcard as an example. Nietzsche received his writing ball in 1882 directly from the inventor, Rasmus Malling-Hansen, in Copenhagen, Denmark. It was the newest model, the portable tall one with a color ribbon, serial number 125, and several typescripts are known to have been written by him on this writing ball (approximately 60). It is known that Nietzsche was also familiar with the newest model from E. Remington and Sons (model 2), but he wanted to buy a portable typewriter, so he chose to buy the Malling-Hansen writing ball, as this model was lightweight and easy to carry. Unfortunately, Nietzsche was not totally satisfied with his purchase and never really mastered the use of the instrument. A number of theories have been advanced to explain why Nietzsche did not make more use of it. For example, Rüdiger Safranski indicates it was "defective". New research indicates Nietzsche was not aware that his trouble in using the machine had been caused by damage to it during transportation to Genoa in Italy, where he lived at the time, and when he turned to a mechanic who had no typewriter repair skills, the man managed to damage the writing ball even more. Nietzsche claimed that his thoughts were influenced by his use of a typewriter ("Our writing instruments contribute to our thoughts", 1882). As one researcher has noted, "Nietzsche's interest in rhetoric and his experience of the typewriter framed his understanding of language in a highly symbolic way: the traditions of the philosophy of language versus the scientific and technological conditions of knowledge." On February 16, 1882 he even wrote a poem about his writing ball.
