= Johanne Agerskov =

Danish medium

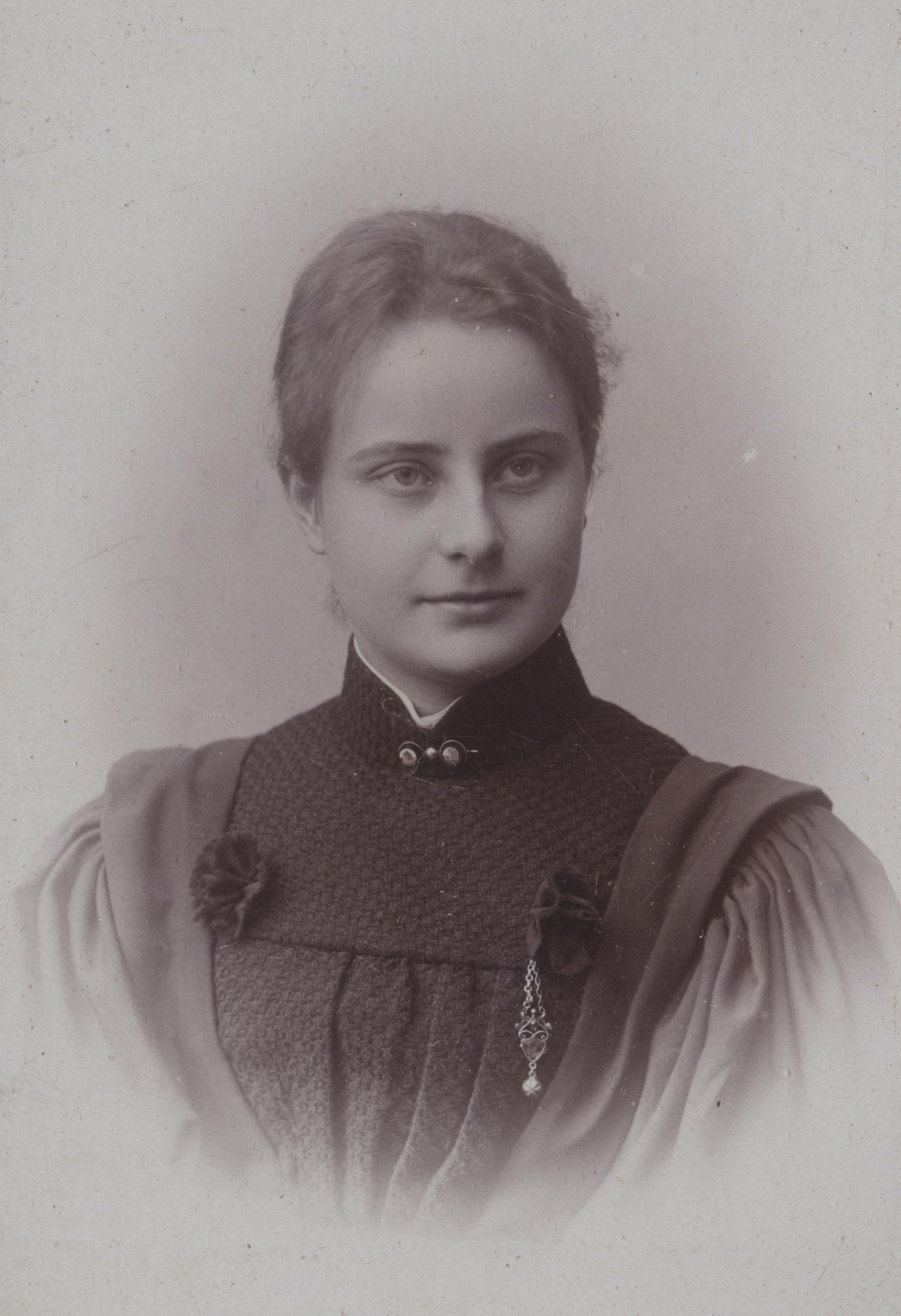
Johanne Agerskov, 1873-1946

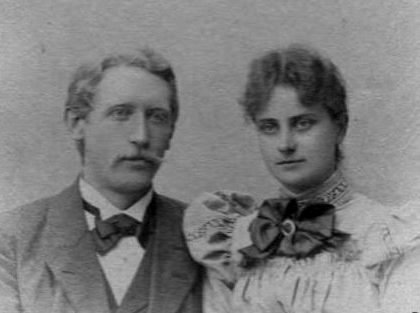
Johanne and Michael Agerskov - photo taken before they married in 1899

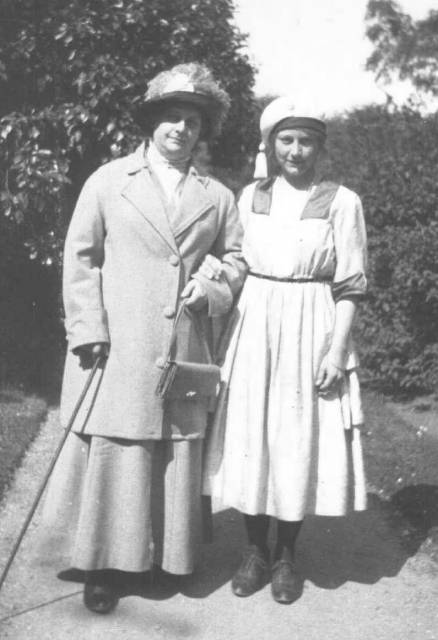
Johanne Agerskov together with her daughter, Inger Agerskov. Photo from 1922

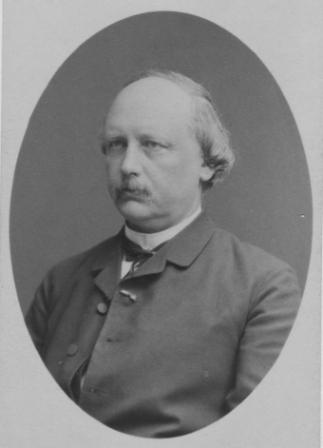
Danish inventor, Rasmus Malling-Hansen, father of Johanne Agerskov. Photo from 1887

Johanne Elisabeth Agerskov (13 June 1873 – 1946) was a Danish medium. Together with her husband, Michael Agerskov, she was responsible for the ethico-religious, philosophical, and pseudo-scientific book, Toward the Light (in Danish, Vandrer mod Lyset!), first published by Michael Agerskov in Copenhagen in 1920.

== Early life ==
She was a daughter of a Danish inventor, minister and principal of the Royal Institute for Deaf-Mutes in Copenhagen Rasmus Malling-Hansen (1835–1890).

In her younger days Johanne Agerskov worked as a teacher, and she married Michael Agerskov in 1899. Their only daughter, Inger Agerskov, was born in 1900, and Johanne became a housewife.

== Spiritualism ==
During the first decade of the twentieth century, Michael became interested in spiritual phenomena, and persuaded his wife to participate in séances, even though she was skeptical in the beginning. Soon Johanne came to believe that the spirits of the transcendental world had called upon her, and had given her the message that she was a medium, and that before her birth she had promised to be instrumental in bringing eternal truths to mankind.

Convinced that she had a special mission, Agerskov and her husband formed a circle with two more couples, and for many years held weekly séances, in which they believed messages from the spirits of the light were given to Agerskov through intuitive thought-inspiration. She claimed a unique ability to close off her own thoughts, so that all she could "hear" in her mind, according to her, was the thoughts of the spirit with whom she was supposed to be in contact. That was very demanding, and in that period she gave up all the pleasures of social life, in order to be focused and prepared for the séances. The members of the circle would submit questions for her to ask the spirits, and shortly she would give them answers, supposedly from the spirits, which the other participants would write down.

== A message to mankind ==
That resulted in the publication of the book, Toward the Light, which Agerskov called "a message to mankind from the transcendental world", and which she and her husband sent out to all the bishops and sixty ministers of the Danish national church. Their hope was that these would participate in a reformation of the Danish church, based upon the new knowledge given in Toward the Light. The Agerskovs made great efforts to that end, through correspondence and by opening their home to anybody who wanted to see them about Toward the Light; but there was little public interest in the book, and the expected reformation did not take place.

Johanne Agerskov was also deeply engaged in the work of her father. In 1924 a Danish professor asserted that Malling-Hansen was not the inventor of the Hansen Writing Ball, and Agerskov undertook a thorough investigation of the facts, together with her sister, Engelke Wiberg. They wrote several articles on the subject, and Agerskov also wrote a book, called Hvem var Skrivekuglens Opfinder? (Who was the Inventor of the Writing Ball?), published in Copenhagen in 1925.

== Later life ==
In 1926 a Society for the Advancement of Toward the Light was formed, which offered religious services for its members, based on Toward the Light. Agerskov was skeptical, however, because Toward the Light calls on believers to remain in the established church and to work for reformation from within.

Even though the Agerskovs in the beginning had participated in spiritualist séances, they soon asked their followers to end that activity, because, as they asserted in Toward the Light, calling on the spirits of deceased ancestors would bring problems to those who could not resist the call to appear. The spirits, they said, needed to rest and to prepare for their next incarnation, and were not allowed to visit the earth.

Michael Agerskov died in 1933, but Johanne continued to answer letters and to publish up until 1938, in collaboration with their daughter. During the last years of her life, Johanne Agerskov suffered from illness, and was not able to leave her home.

== Photos of Johanne Agerskov ==
There has been controversy among Agerskov's followers over whether or not to publish photos of her, as she said to destroy all her own pictures of herself before she died. Some of the followers of Toward the Light! contend that her will in this matter should be respected, and oppose the publication of such pictures.

Others see nothing wrong with publishing photos of her, considering that photos of her are available in public collections in both Denmark and Norway, and on the World-Wide Web. This article contains photos of both Agerskov and her husband, supplied by their descendants, who have no objection to their publication.

== Selected works ==
- Hilsen til Danmark (Greetings to Denmark), Copenhagen 1915
- Toward the Light!, Copenhagen 1920
- The Doctrine of Atonement and the Shorter Road, Copenhagen 1920
- Some Psychic Experiences, by Michael Agerskov, Copenhagen 1922
- Questions and answers I and II, Copenhagen 1929-30
- Hvem var Skrivekuglens Opfinder? Copenhagen 1925
