= Michael Agerskov =

Danish writer

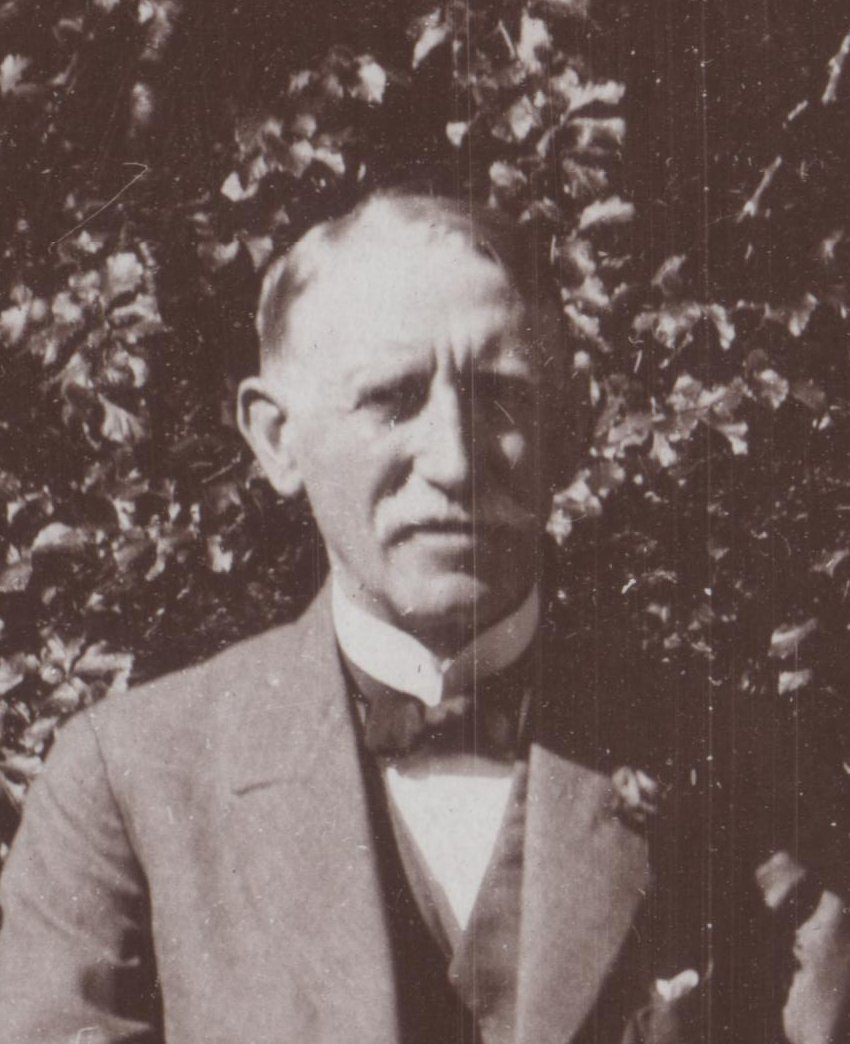
Michael Agerskov, 1870-1933

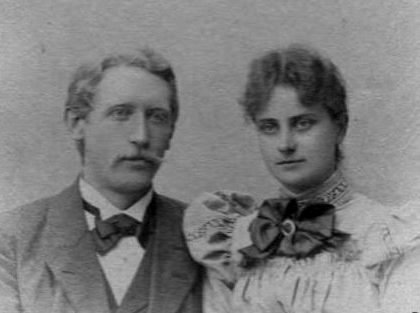
Johanne and Michael Agerskov - photo taken before they married in 1899

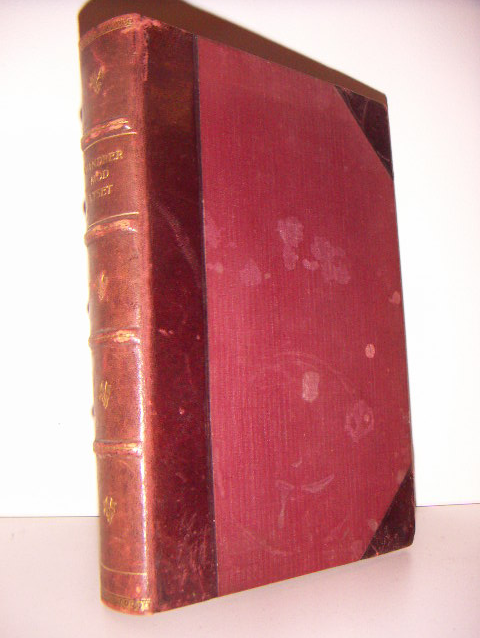
Michael Agerskov's copy of Vandrer mod Lyset!, given to him as a present from the blacksmith A. Andér, who later made a model of the universe, as described in Toward the Light.

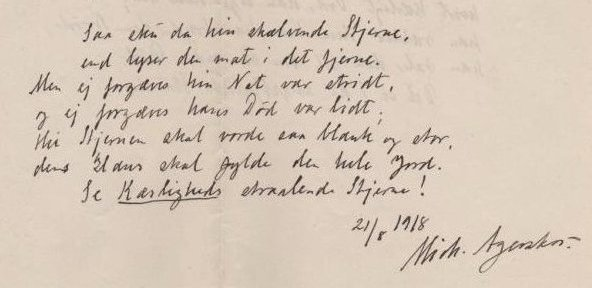
A sample of Michael Agerskov's handwriting

Michael Agerskov (1870–1933) was a Danish spiritualist teacher and author, best known for his book, Toward the Light, which he co-authored with his wife Johanne Agerskov. Agerskov's literary production includes poems, novels, and also schoolbooks for the primary school and the secondary school in Denmark. Together with Erling Rørdam he also wrote a reader, published several times during 1904 and 1933, and also translated into Swedish.

== Overview ==
In the first decade of the last century Michael Agerskov became interested in spiritistic phenomena, and participated in spiritistic séances together with his wife, and he also produced several poems by the means of what was called automatic writing, the hand writing down the thoughts of a discarnated spirit. Many of these poems were made public. It soon became obvious that Johanne Agerskov was an intermediary, and they formed a circle together with two other couples, and held séances, because they were told that they before their incarnation had promised to take on the task of being the instrumental to bring to mankind some truths from the transcendental world. Johanne Agerskov had the unique ability to close off her own thoughts, and to intuitively receive the thoughts of the spirits that contacted her. The other participants were called on to form questions, on which the spirits gave the answers, which were then written down. This work continued for several years, and resulted in the publishing of the ethic-religious, philosophic and scientific book Toward the Light and to several other books concerning the same issues.

Michael Agerskov was the publisher of all the books, along with his work as a teacher, censor and author of his own literary works. Toward the Light was distributed to all the bishops and to 60 ministers of the Danish church, and the Agerskovs' hope and intention was the Danish church to go through a reformation on the basis of the information given in Toward the Light with the participation of the bishops and the ministers. But even though Toward the Light had many followers among the common people, the church did not react, and the book did not lead to a public interest to any extent.

Even though Michael and Johanne Agerskov had participated in spiritistic séances, they soon urged the spiritists to end their activities. In Toward the Light there is very clearly stated that the spirits of the dead human beings are not allowed to visit the earth, because they need to rest and to prepare for their next incarnation. Only if we are called upon by the spirits of the light, we should react to their calling.

After many requests, Michael Agerskov in 1922 wrote the story about the extraordinary events that had led to the publishing of Toward the Light in the book, Some Psychic Experiences.

In 1928 Agerskov had a serious attack of influenza, and as a repercussion of the illness he developed a serious condition of increasing paralysis of the muscles, and he had to end his work as a teacher. In 1932 he was so weak that he could not cross the floor of their living room by his own means, and soon after the condition also involved the heart muscle. He died in 1933.

== Literary works ==
- To Mennesker og Skumring, poems 1893
- Adathysta, novel 1897
- Livets Kilde, short stories 1897
- Tusmørkets Stemmer, poems 1899
- Den store Krudtsammensværgelse, novel 1902
- Fra den gamle Skipperby og andre Digte, poems 1909
- Vejen Sandheden og Livet, Aandelige sange, poems 1928
- Paa forklarelsens Berg - En digtkreds, poems

== Books related to Toward the Light ==
- Hilsen til Danmark, 1915
- Toward the Light, Copenhagen 1920
- The Doctrine of Atonement and the Shorter Road, Copenhagen 1920
- Some Psychic Experiences, Copenhagen 1922
- Kirken og Kristendommen, 1923
- Questions and Answers I and II, Copenhagen 1929-30
