= Embroidery =

Art or handicraft of decorating fabric or other materials with needle and thread or yarn

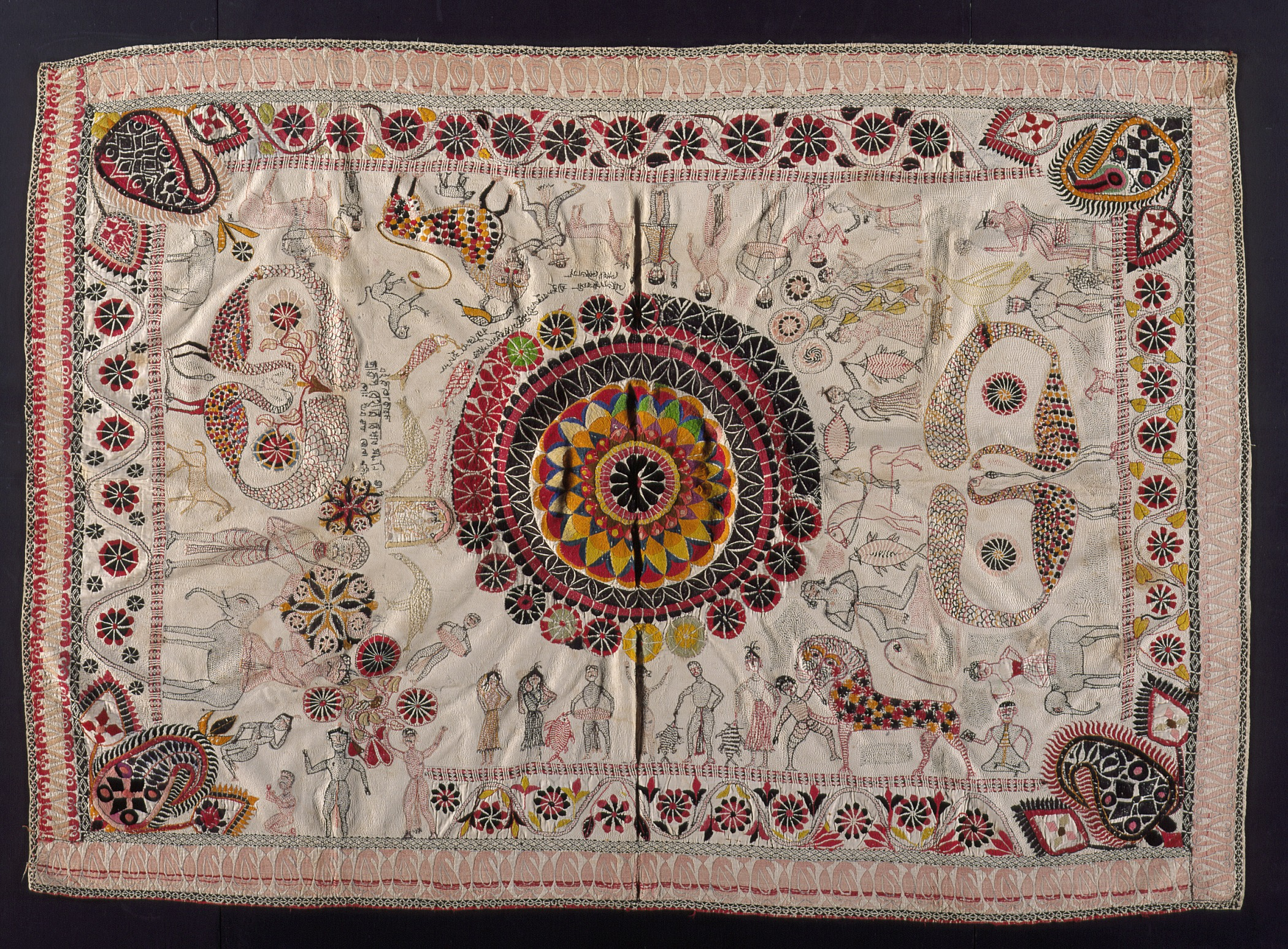
Traditional Nakshi Kantha of Bangladesh

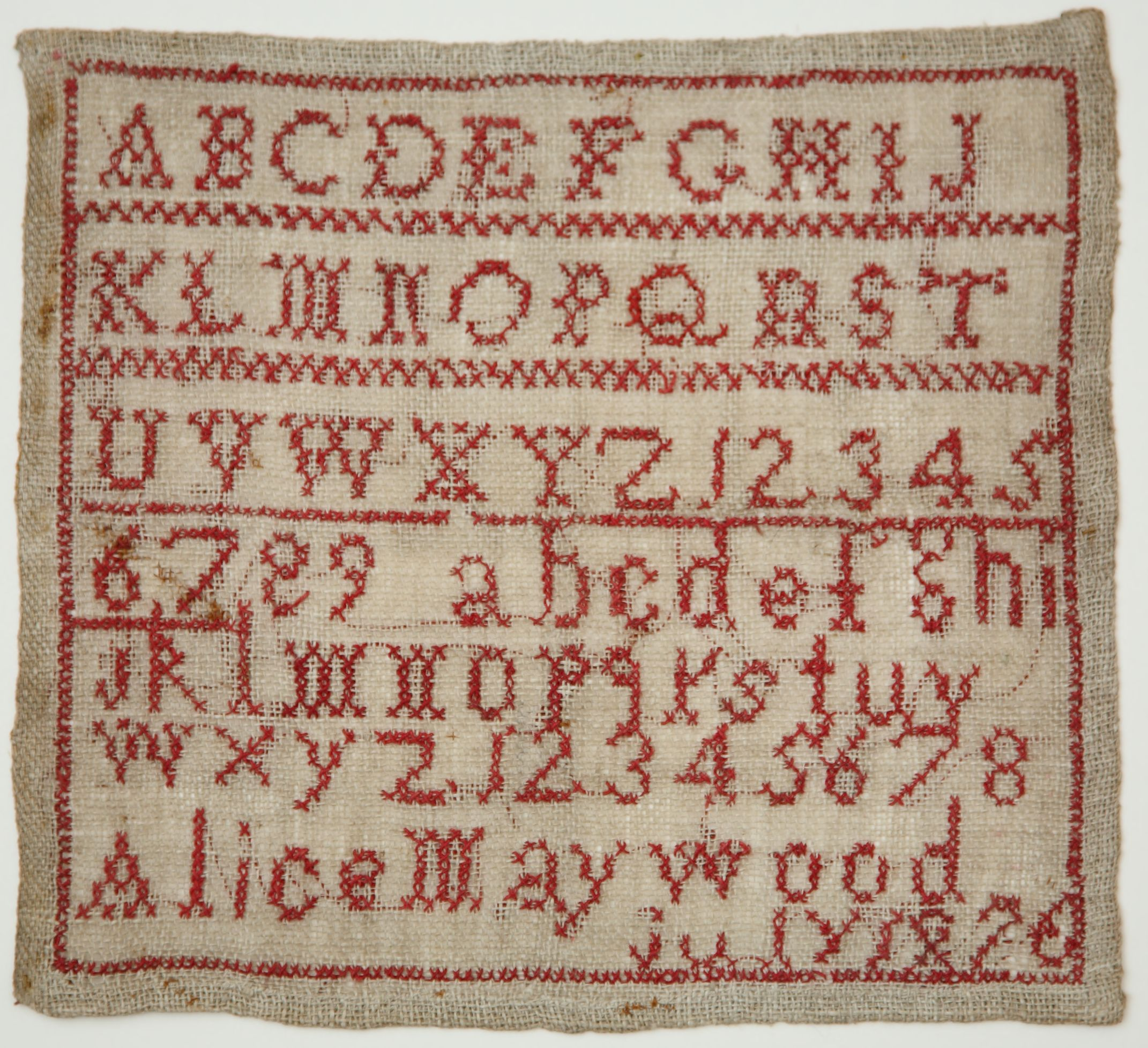
Embroidery sampler by Alice Maywood, 1826

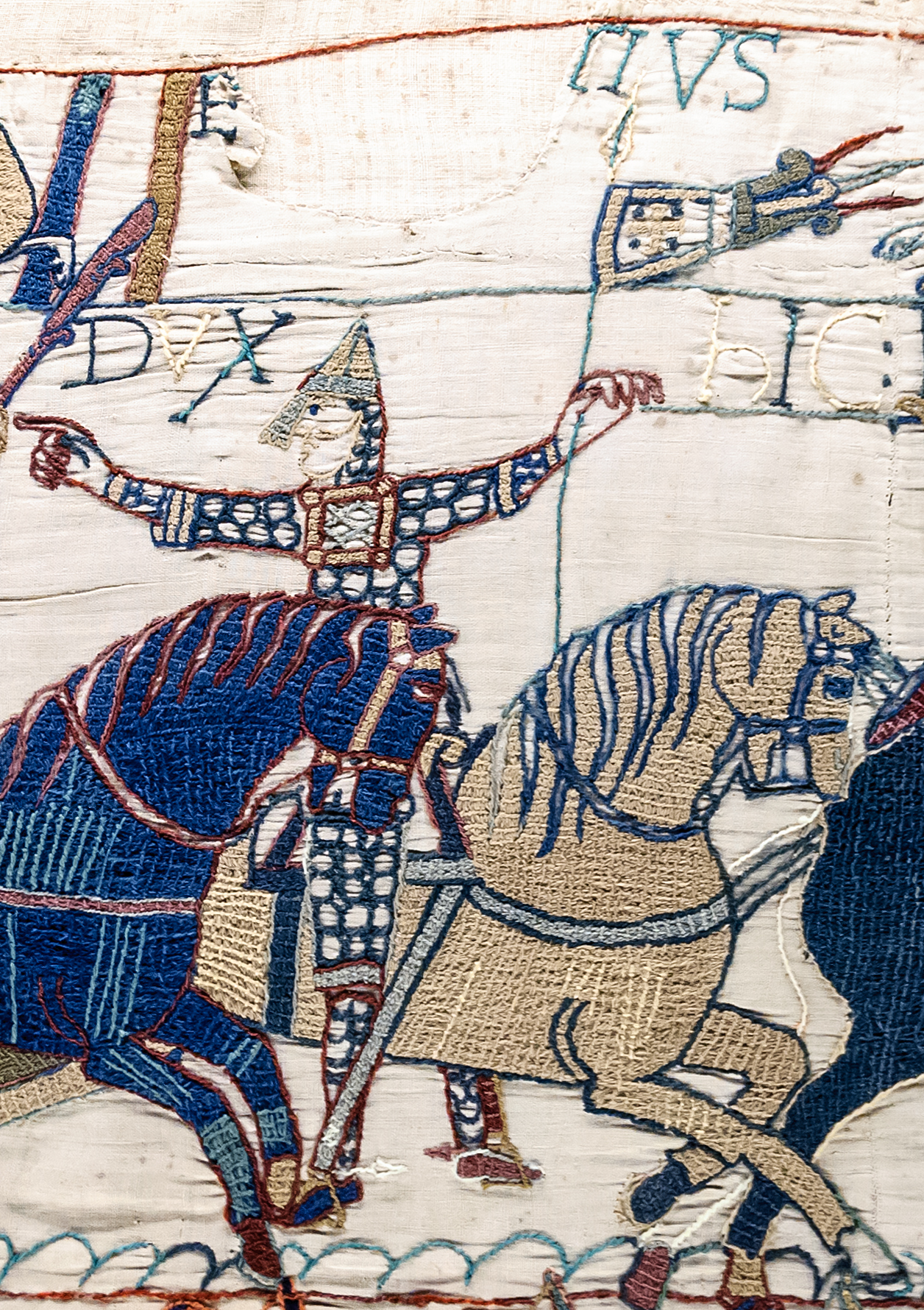
Laid threads, a surface technique in wool on linen. The Bayeux Tapestry, 11th century.

Embroidery is the art of decorating fabric or other materials using a needle to stitch thread or yarn. It is one of the oldest forms of needlework, a type of textile art, with origins dating back thousands of years across various cultures. Common stitches found in early embroidery include the chain stitch, buttonhole or blanket stitch, running stitch, satin stitch, and cross stitch. Modern embroidery continues to utilize traditional techniques, though many contemporary stitches are exclusive to machine embroidery.

Embroidery is commonly used to embellish accessories and garments and is usually seen on quilts, clothing, and accessories. In addition to thread, embroidery may incorporate materials such as pearls, beads, quills, and sequins to highlight texture and design. Today, embroidery serves both decorative and functional purposes and is utilized in fashion expression, cultural identity, and custom-made gifts.

A person who is doing embroidery is called an embroiderer. An archaic term is broderer, derived from the French broderie ("embroidery").

== Classification ==
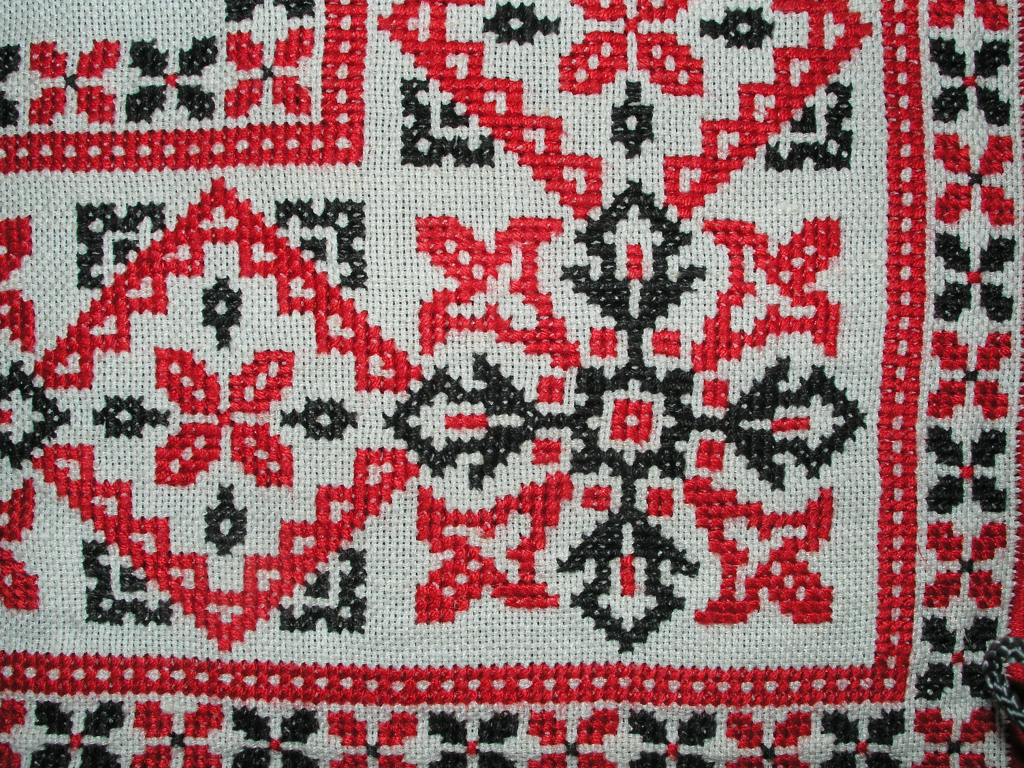
Tea-cloth, Hungary, mid-20th century

Embroidery can be classified according to what degree the design takes into account the nature of the base material and by the relationship of stitch placement to the fabric. The main categories are free or surface embroidery, counted-thread embroidery, and needlepoint or canvas work.

In free or surface embroidery, designs are applied without regard to the weave of the underlying fabric. Examples include crewel and traditional Chinese and Japanese embroidery.

Counted-thread embroidery patterns are created by making stitches over a predetermined number of threads in the foundation fabric. Counted-thread embroidery is more easily worked on an even-weave foundation fabric such as embroidery canvas, aida cloth, or specially woven cotton and linen fabrics. Examples include cross-stitch and some forms of blackwork embroidery.

While similar to counted thread in regards to technique, in canvas work or needlepoint, threads are stitched through a fabric mesh to create a dense pattern that completely covers the foundation fabric. Examples of canvas work include bargello and Berlin wool work.

Embroidery can also be classified by the similarity of its appearance. In drawn thread work and cutwork, the foundation fabric is deformed or cut away to create holes that are then embellished with embroidery, often with thread in the same color as the foundation fabric. When created with white thread on white linen or cotton, this work is collectively referred to as whitework. However, whitework can either be counted or free. Hardanger embroidery is a counted embroidery and the designs are often geometric. Conversely, styles such as Broderie anglaise are similar to free embroidery, with floral or abstract designs that are not dependent on the weave of the fabric.

== History ==
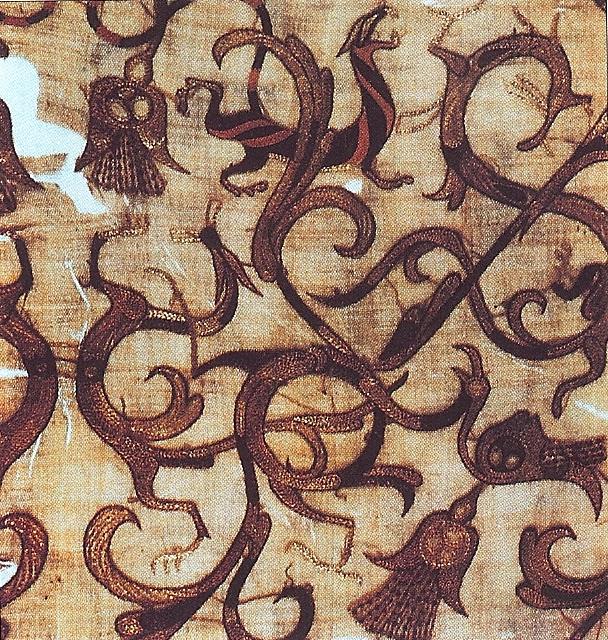
Detail of embroidered silk gauze ritual garment. Rows of even, round chain stitch used for outline and color. 4th century BC, Zhou tomb at Mashan, Hubei, China.

=== Origins ===
The process used to tailor, patch, mend and reinforce cloth fostered the development of sewing techniques, and the decorative possibilities of sewing led to the art of embroidery. Indeed, the remarkable stability of basic embroidery stitches has been noted:

It is a striking fact that in the development of embroidery ... there are no changes of materials or techniques which can be felt or interpreted as advances from a primitive to a later, more refined stage. On the other hand, we often find in early works a technical accomplishment and high standard of craftsmanship rarely attained in later times.

The art of embroidery has been found worldwide and several early examples have been found. The earliest surviving embroidered cloth comes from Egypt. The Egyptians were skilled at embroidery, using appliqué decorations with leather and beads. Works in China have been dated to the Warring States period (5th–3rd century BC). and continued to develop over subsequent dynasties, flourishing during the Song, Yuan, Ming, and Qing periods, when it became an established artistic and cultural practice. Related but distinct embroidery traditions also developed in region of Southeast Asia, such as Nonya beadwork associated with Peranakan communities. While influenced by Chinese techniques, this form reflected a unique cultural synthesis by incorporating local materials and traditions. In a garment from Migration period Sweden, roughly 300–700 AD, the edges of bands of trimming are reinforced with running stitch, back stitch, stem stitch, tailor's buttonhole stitch, and Whip stitch, but it is uncertain whether this work simply reinforced the seams or should be interpreted as decorative embroidery.

=== Historical applications and techniques ===
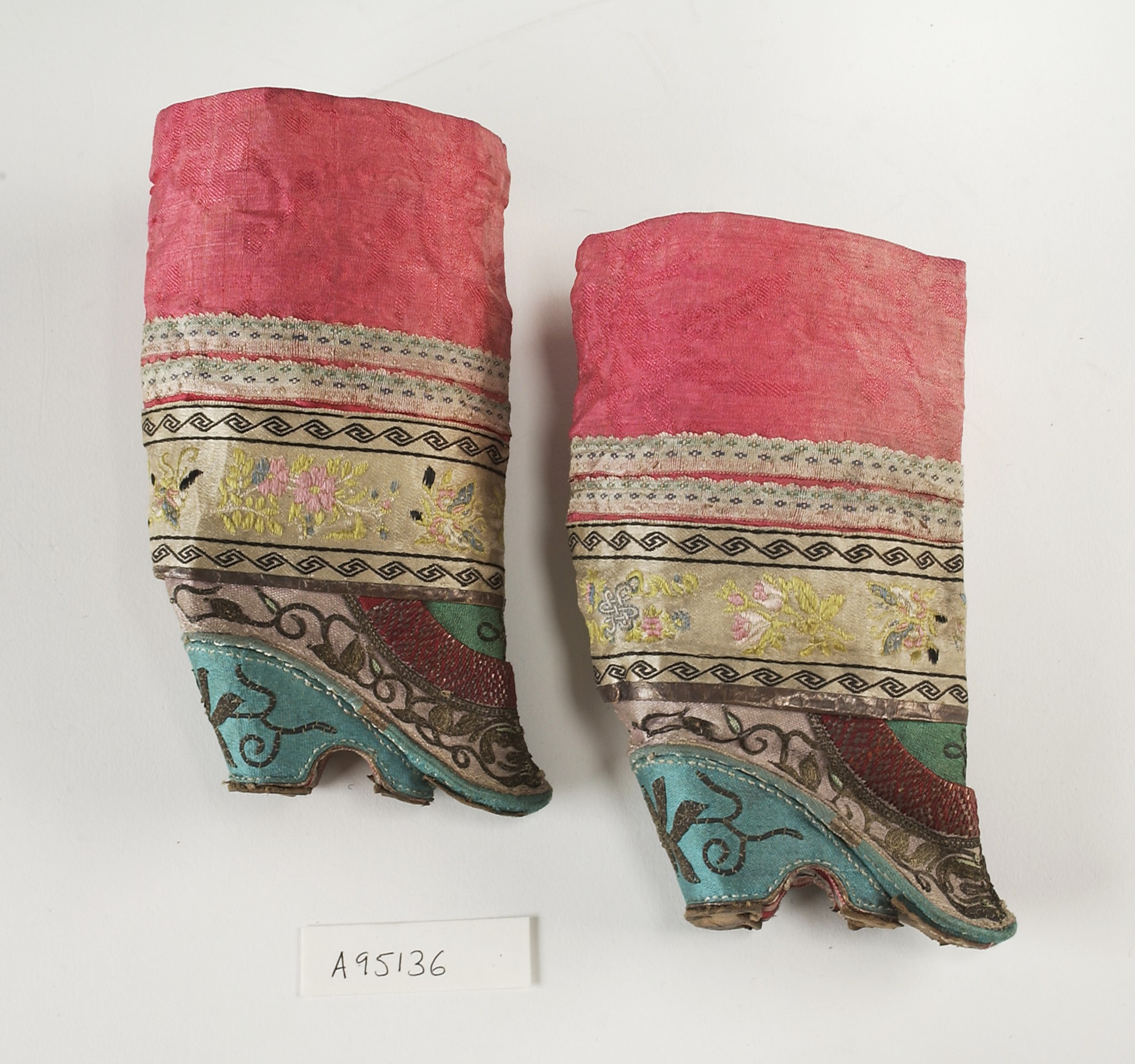
A pair of Chinese shoes for bound "lily" feet

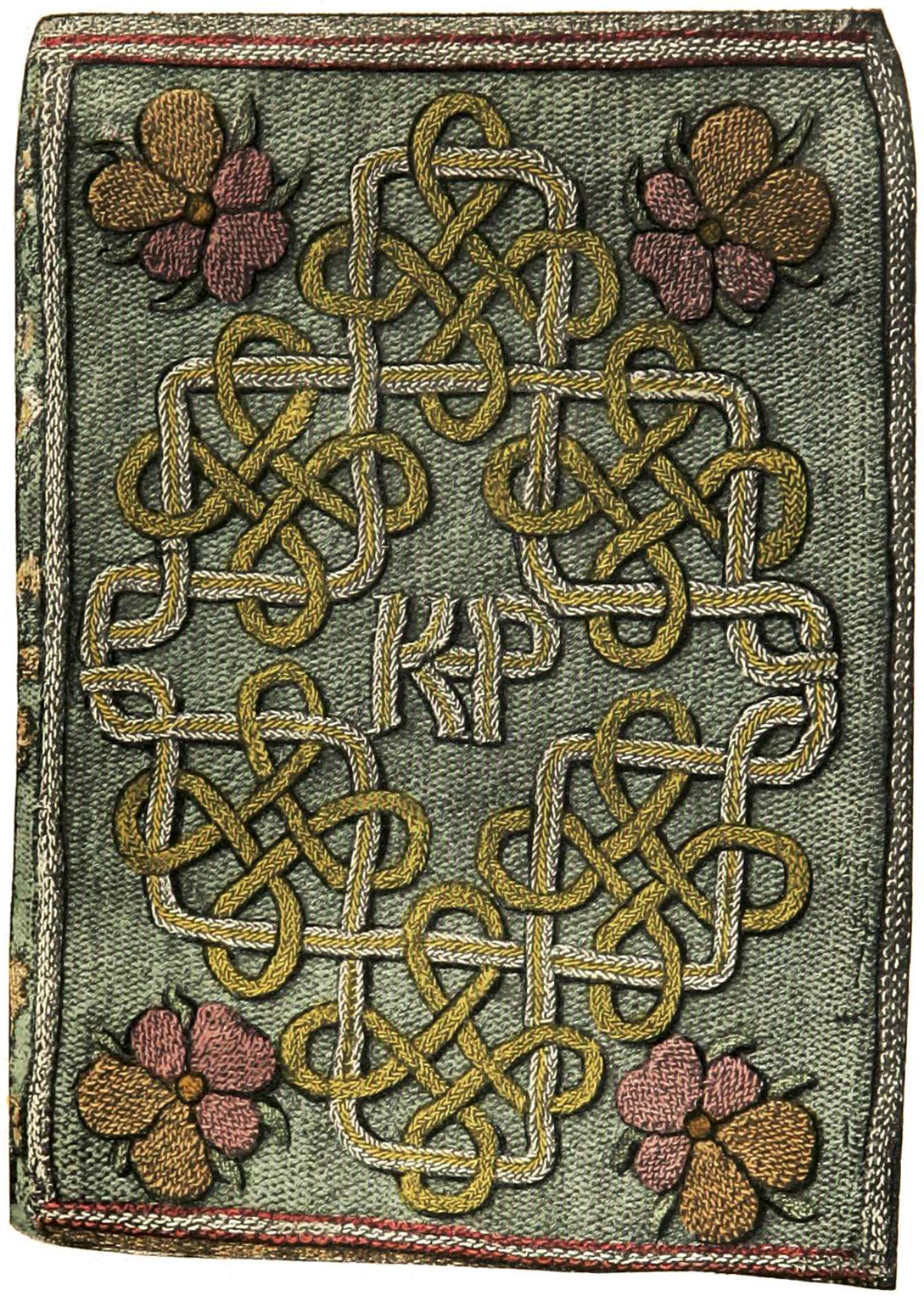
Embroidered book cover made by Elizabeth I at the age of 11, presented to Katherine Parr

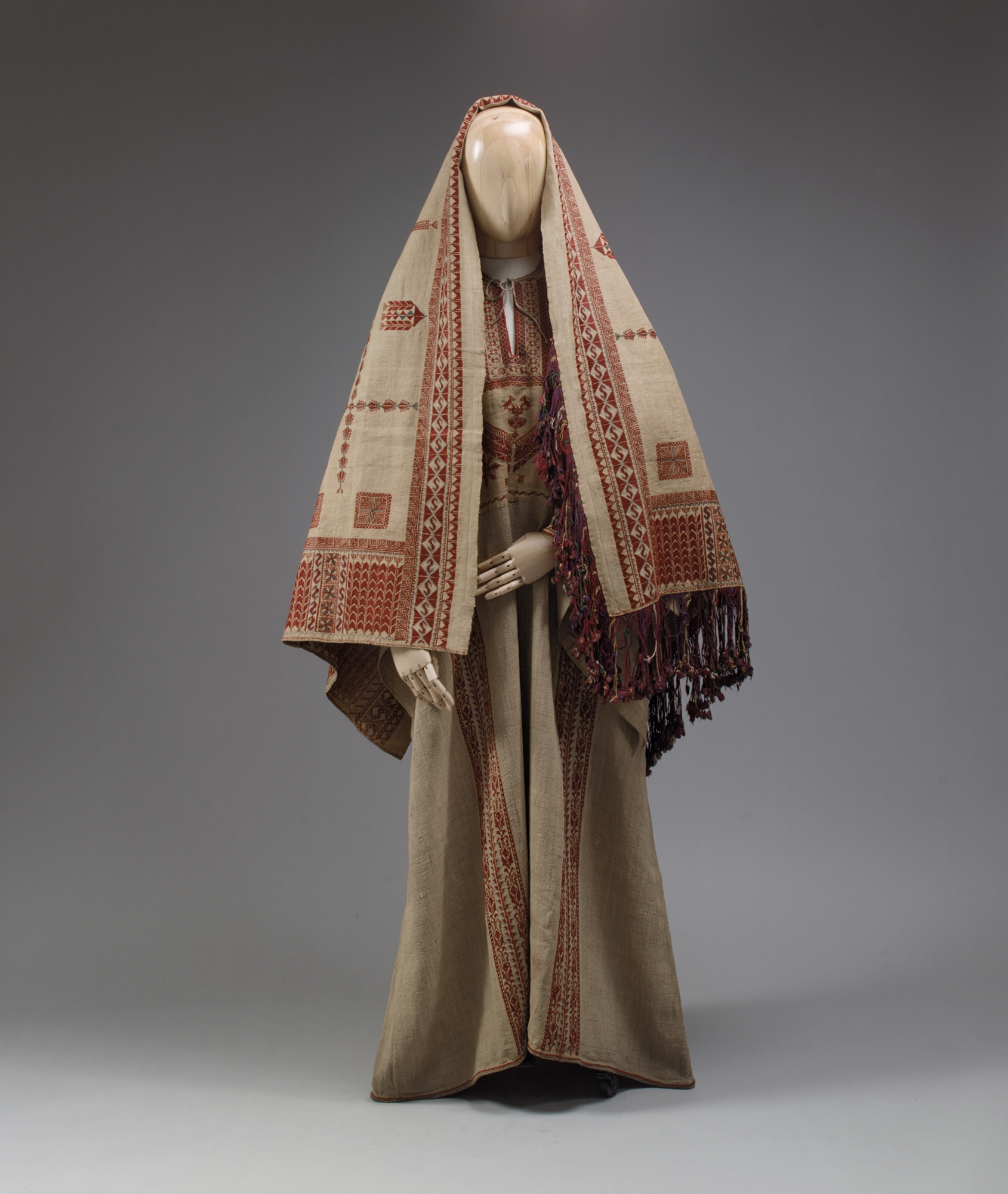
19th-century women's thobe from Palestine

Depending on time, location and materials available, embroidery could be the domain of a few experts or a widespread, popular technique. This flexibility led to a variety of works, from the royal to the mundane. Examples of high status items include elaborately embroidered clothing, religious objects, and household items often were seen as a mark of wealth and status.

In medieval England, Opus Anglicanum, a technique used by professional workshops and guilds in medieval England, was used to embellish textiles used in church rituals. In 16th-century England, some books, usually bibles or other religious texts, had embroidered bindings. The Bodleian Library in Oxford contains one presented to Queen Elizabeth I in 1583. It also owns a copy of The Epistles of Saint Paul, whose cover was reputedly embroidered by the Queen.

One of the oldest complete embroidered works still in existence is the Bayeux Tapestry, an embroidered cloth nearly 70 metres (230 feet) long and 50 centimetres (20 inches) tall that depicts the events leading up to the Norman Conquest of England in 1066, led by William, Duke of Normandy, challenging Harold II, King of England, and culminating in the Battle of Hastings. It is thought to date to the 11th century, within a few years of the battle.

In 18th-century England and its colonies, with the rise of the merchant class and the wider availability of luxury materials, rich embroideries began to appear in a secular context. These embroideries took the form of items displayed in private homes of well-to-do citizens, as opposed to a church or royal setting. Even so, the embroideries themselves may still have had religious themes. Samplers employing fine silks were produced by the daughters of wealthy families. Embroidery was a skill marking a girl's path into womanhood as well as conveying rank and social standing.

Embroidery was an important art and signified social status in the Medieval Islamic world as well. The 17th-century Turkish traveler Evliya Çelebi called it the "craft of the two hands". In cities such as Damascus, Cairo and Istanbul, embroidery was visible on handkerchiefs, uniforms, flags, calligraphy, shoes, robes, tunics, horse trappings, slippers, sheaths, pouches, covers, and even on leather belts. Craftsmen embroidered items with gold and silver thread. Embroidery cottage industries, some employing more than eight hundred people, grew to supply these items.

In the 16th century, in the reign of the Mughal Emperor Akbar, his chronicler Abu al-Fazl ibn Mubarak wrote in the famous Ain-i-Akbari:

His majesty [Akbar] pays much attention to various stuffs; hence Irani, Ottoman, and Mongolian articles of wear are in much abundance especially textiles embroidered in the patterns of Nakshi, Saadi, Chikhan, Ari, Zardozi, Wastli, Gota, and Kohra. The imperial workshops in the towns of Lahore, Agra, Fatehpur, Ahmedabad, and Gujarat turn out many masterpieces of workmanship in fabrics, and the figures and patterns, knots and variety of fashions which now prevail astonish even the most experienced travelers. Taste for fine material has since become general, and the drapery of embroidered fabrics used at feasts surpasses every description.

Embroidery was often perceived primarily as a domestic task performed by women, frequently viewed as a leisurely activity rather than recognized as a skilled craft. Women who lacked access to formal education or writing implements often used embroidery to document their lives through stitched narratives, effectively creating personal diaries through textile art, especially when literacy was limited. However, this perception varied across historical contexts. In late Qing China, for example, the embroidery industry expanded significantly, with regional styles emerging and production becoming increasingly commercialized. During this time, men often worked as managing and designing roles, while the women were frequently confined to lower status, more seasonal labor. However, by the early 20th century, large reform movements aimed to change this system by incorporating embroidery into women's education and vocational training. This helped establish embroidery both as a practical skill and as a form of artistic expression, expanding women's roles with the field.

Embroidery is also a folk art, using materials that were accessible to nonprofessionals. Examples include Hardanger embroidery from Norway; Merezhka from Ukraine; Mountmellick embroidery from Ireland; Nakshi kantha from Bangladesh and West Bengal; Achachi from Peru; and Brazilian embroidery. Many techniques had a practical use such as Sashiko from Japan, which was used as a way to reinforce clothing.

In marginalized communities, embroidery has also served as a tool of empowerment and expression. For example, in Inner Mongolia, embroidery initiatives arose in response to economic pressures intensified by climate change, including desertification, allowing women to express themselves and preserve cultural identities through traditional embroidery skills. Embroidery has also preserved the stories of marginalized groups, particularly women of color, whose experiences were historically underrepresented in written records. In South African communities, embroidered "story cloths" have captured and preserved critical perspectives and events otherwise missing from historical narratives.

=== 21st century ===
Since the late 2010s, there has been a growth in the popularity of embroidering by hand. As a result of visual social media such as Pinterest and Instagram, artists can share their work more extensively, which has inspired younger generations to pick up needlework.

Contemporary embroidery artists believe hand embroidery has grown in popularity as a result of an increasing need for relaxation and digitally disconnecting practices. Many people are also using embroidery to creatively upcycle and repair clothing, to help counteract over-consumption and fashion industry waste.

Modern canvas work tends to follow symmetrical counted stitching patterns with designs emerging from the repetition of one or just a few similar stitches in a variety of hues. In contrast, many forms of surface embroidery make use of a wide range of stitching patterns in a single piece of work.

== In literature ==
Embroidery portrays a large function of representation in many literary works. Hobbies in regards to stitching, dressmaking, or quilting have learned to be acquainted with women through the 18th to 19th century. Embroidery alters itself in literary contexts to perform as a symbol instead of a depiction of culture and rooted history. Novels by Jane Austen capture a depiction where women are riddled with silent productivity and installs certain societal norms within a specific gender.

In Greek mythology the goddess Athena is said to have passed down the art of embroidery (along with weaving) to humans, leading to the famed competition between herself and the mortal Arachne.

== Traditional hand embroidery around the world ==
Traditional embroidery	Origin	Stitches used	Materials	Picture
Aari embroidery	Kashmir and Kutch, Gujarat, India	Chain stitch	Silk thread, fabric, beads or sequins	
Art needlework	England			
Assisi embroidery	Assisi, Italy	Backstitch, cross stitch, Holbein stitch	Cloth, red thread, silk, stranded perlé cotton	
Balochi needlework	Balochistan, Pakistan		Beads, cloth, shisha, thread	
Bargello	Florence, Italy	Vertical stitches (e.g. "flame stitch")	Linen or cotton canvas, wool floss or yarn	
Berlin wool work	Berlin, Germany	Cross stitch or tent stitch	Linen or cotton canvas, wool floss or yarn	
Blackwork	England	Backstitch, Holbein stitch, stem stitch	Linen or cotton fabric, black or red silk thread	
Brazilian embroidery	Brazil	Bullion knots, cast-on stitch, drizzle stitch, French knots, featherstitch, fly stitch, stem stitch	Cloth, rayon thread	
Broderie anglaise	Czechia	Buttonhole stitch, overcast stitch, satin stitch	White cloth and thread	
Broderie perse	India		Chintz, thread	
Bunka shishu	Japan	Punch needle techniques	Rayon or silk thread	
Candlewicking	United States	Knotted stitch, satin stitch	Unbleached cotton thread, unbleached muslin	
Chasu	Korea	Chain stitch, couching, leaf stitch, long-and-short stitch, mat stitch, outline stitch, padding stitch, satin stitches, seed stitch		
Chikankari	Lucknow, India	Backstitches, chain stitches, shadow-work, perforated patterns, jaali,	Cloth, raw white cotton thread, silk thread, polyester thread.	
Colcha embroidery	Southwestern United States		Cotton or linen cloth, wool thread	
Crewelwork	Great Britain	Chain stitch, couched stitches, knotted stitches, satin stitch, seed stitch, split stitch, stem stitch	Crewel yarn, linen twill	
Goldwork	China	Couching, Holbein stitch, stem stitch	Cloth, metallic thread	
Gota patti	Rajasthan, India			
Gu Xiu	Shanghai, China		Silk cloth and thread	
Hardanger embroidery	Norway	Buttonhole stitch, cable stitch, fly stitch, knotted stitch, picot, running stitch, satin stitch	White thread, white even-weave linen cloth	
Hedebo embroidery	Hedebo, Zealand, Denmark		White linen cloth and thread	
Kaitag textiles	Kaytagsky District, Dagestan, Russia	Laid-and-couched work	Cotton cloth, silk thread	
Kalaga	Burma			
Kantha	Eastern India		Old saris, thread	
Kasidakari	India	Chain stitch, darning stitch, satin stitch, stem stitch		
Kasuti	Karnataka, India	Cross stitch, double running stitch, running stitch, zigzag running stitch	Cotton thread and cloth	Motifs of kasuti embroidery
Khamak	Kandahar, Afghanistan	Satin stitch	Cotton or wool fabric, silk thread	
Kuba textiles	The Congo	Embroidery, appliqué, cut-pile embroidery	Raffia cloth and thread	
Kutch embroidery	Kutch, Gujarat, India		Cotton cloth, cotton or silk thread	
Lambada embroidery	Banjara people			
Mountmellick work	Mountmellick, County Laois, Ireland	Knotted stitches, padded stitches	White cotton cloth and thread	
Opus anglicanum	England	Split stitch, surface couching, underside couching	Linen or velvet cloth, metallic thread, silk thread	
Opus teutonicum	Holy Roman Empire	Buttonhole stitch, chain stitch, goblien stitch, pulled work, satin stitch, stem stitch	White linen cloth and thread	
Or nué	Western Europe	Couching	Fabric, metallic thread, silk thread	
Orphrey				
Needlepoint	Ancient Egypt	Cross stitch, tent stitch, brick stitch	Linen or cotton canvas, wool or silk floss or yarn	
Phool Patti ka Kaam	Uttar Pradesh, India			
Phulkari	Punjab	Darning stitches	Hand-spun cotton cloth, silk floss	
Piteado	Central America		Ixtle or pita thread, leather	
Quillwork	North America		Beads, cloth, feathers, feather quills, leather, porcupine quills	
Rasht embroidery	Rasht, Gilan Province, Iran	Chain stitch	Felt, silk thread	
Redwork	United States	Backstitch, outline stitch	Red thread, white cloth	
Richelieu	Purportedly from 16th-century Italy, revival in 19th-century England and France	Buttonhole stitch	White thread, white cloth	
Rushnyk	Slavs	Cross stitch, Holbein stitch, satin stitch	Linen or hemp cloth, thread	
Sashiko	Japan	Running stitch	Indigo-dyed cloth, white or red cotton thread	
Sermeh embroidery	Achaemenid Persia		Termeh cloth, velvet, cotton fabrics, various threads	
Sewed muslin	Scotland		Muslin, thread	
Shu Xiu	Chengdu, Sichuan, China		Satin, silk thread	
Smocking	England	Cable stitch, honeycomb stitches, knotted stitches, outline stitch, stem stitch, trellis stitch, wave stitch	Any fabric supple enough to be gathered, cotton or silk thread	
Stumpwork	England			
Su Xiu	Suzhou, Jiangsu, China		Silk cloth and thread	
Suzani	Central Asia	Buttonhole stitches, chain stitches, couching, satin stitches	Cotton fabric, silk thread	
Tatreez	Palestine, Syria	Cross stitch	Cotton fabric, silk thread	
Tenango embroidery	Tenango de Doria, Hidalgo, Mexico			
Velours du Kasaï	Kasai, the Congo			
Vietnamese embroidery	Vietnam			
Xiang Xiu	Hunan, China		Silk cloth, black, white, and grey silk thread	
Yue Xiu	Guangdong, China		Silk cloth and thread	
Zardozi	Iran and India		Cloth, metallic thread	
Zmijanje embroidery	Zmijanje, Bosnia and Herzegovina		Blue thread, white cloth	
Theu tay Truyen thong	Vietnam	Layerd stitch	Silk thread, controlled thin stitches	

== Materials and tools ==
=== Materials ===
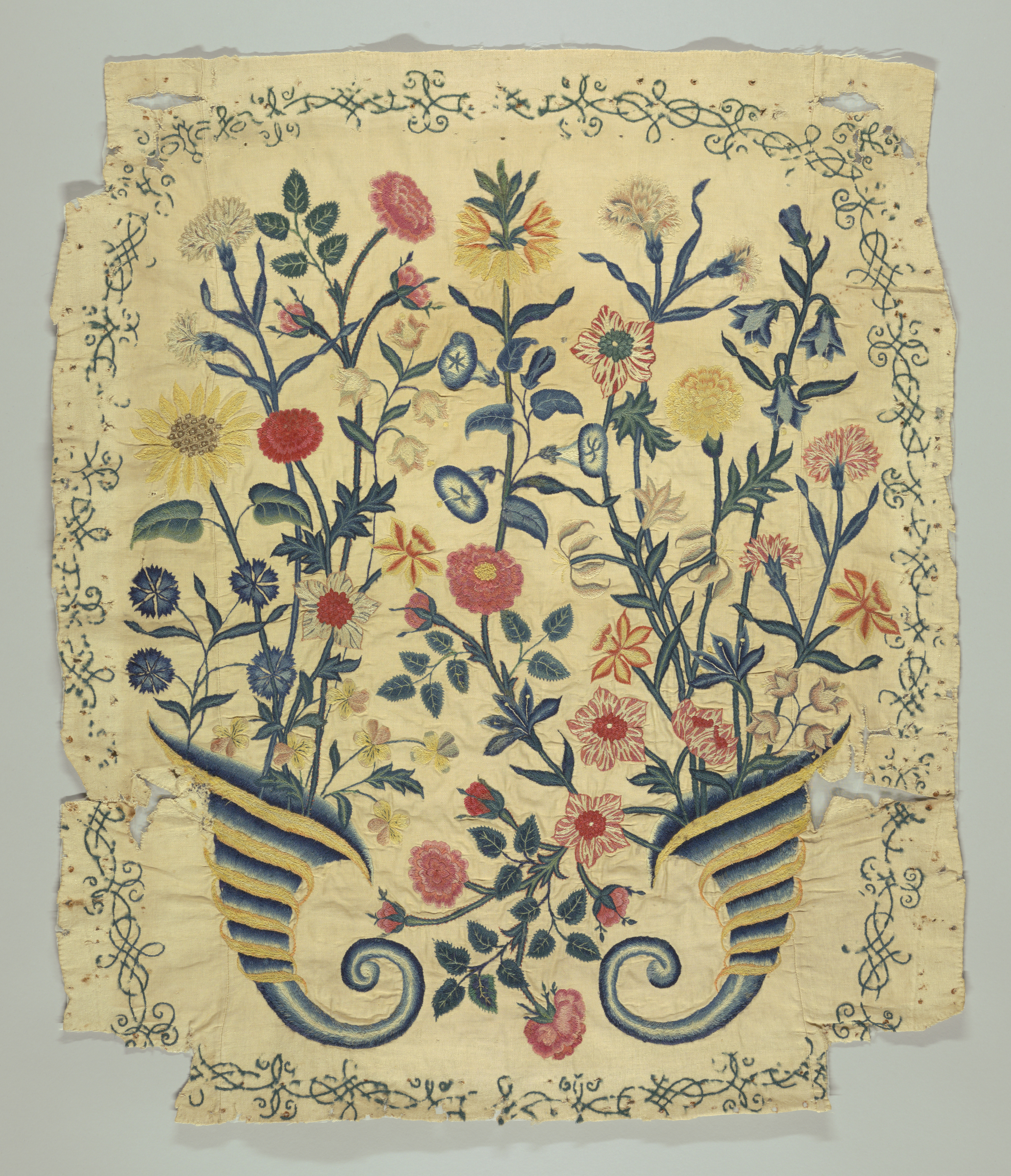
Multi-colored crewel wool threads on a panel of linen warp and cotton weft, 18th-century English

The fabrics and yarns used in traditional embroidery vary from place to place. Wool, linen, and silk have been in use for thousands of years for both fabric and yarn. Today, embroidery thread is manufactured in cotton, rayon, and novelty yarns as well as in traditional wool, linen, and silk. Ribbon embroidery uses narrow ribbon in silk or silk/organza blend ribbon, most commonly to create floral motifs.

Canvas work techniques, in which large amounts of yarn are buried on the back of the work, use more materials but provide a sturdier and more substantial finished textile.

=== Tools ===
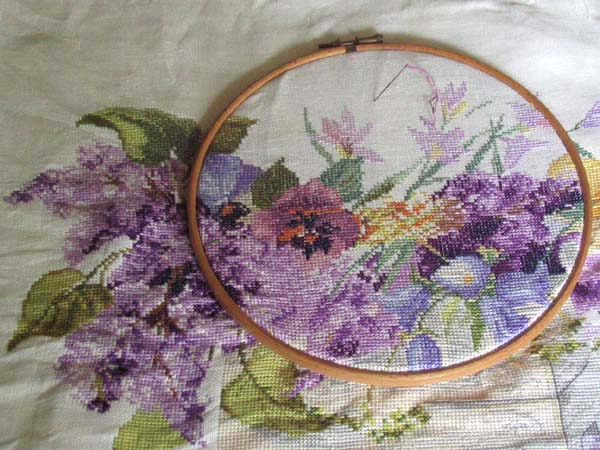
An embroidery hoop

A sewing needle is the main stitching tool in embroidery, and comes in various sizes and types. The tips may be sharp or blunt, depending on the type of material the needle needs to be drawn through. Tapestry needles are blunt and larger than a chenille needle which is sharp and shorter than a standard embroidery needle.

In both canvas work and surface embroidery, an embroidery hoop or frame can be used to stretch the material and ensure even stitching tension which prevents pattern distortion. Frames can come in a square or rectangular shape and prevent the canvas from distorting. The two types of frames used are scroll and artist's stretcher bars.

Beeswax is often used to treat thread. It smooths and strengthens threads, especially silk and metallic threads.

== Machine embroidery ==
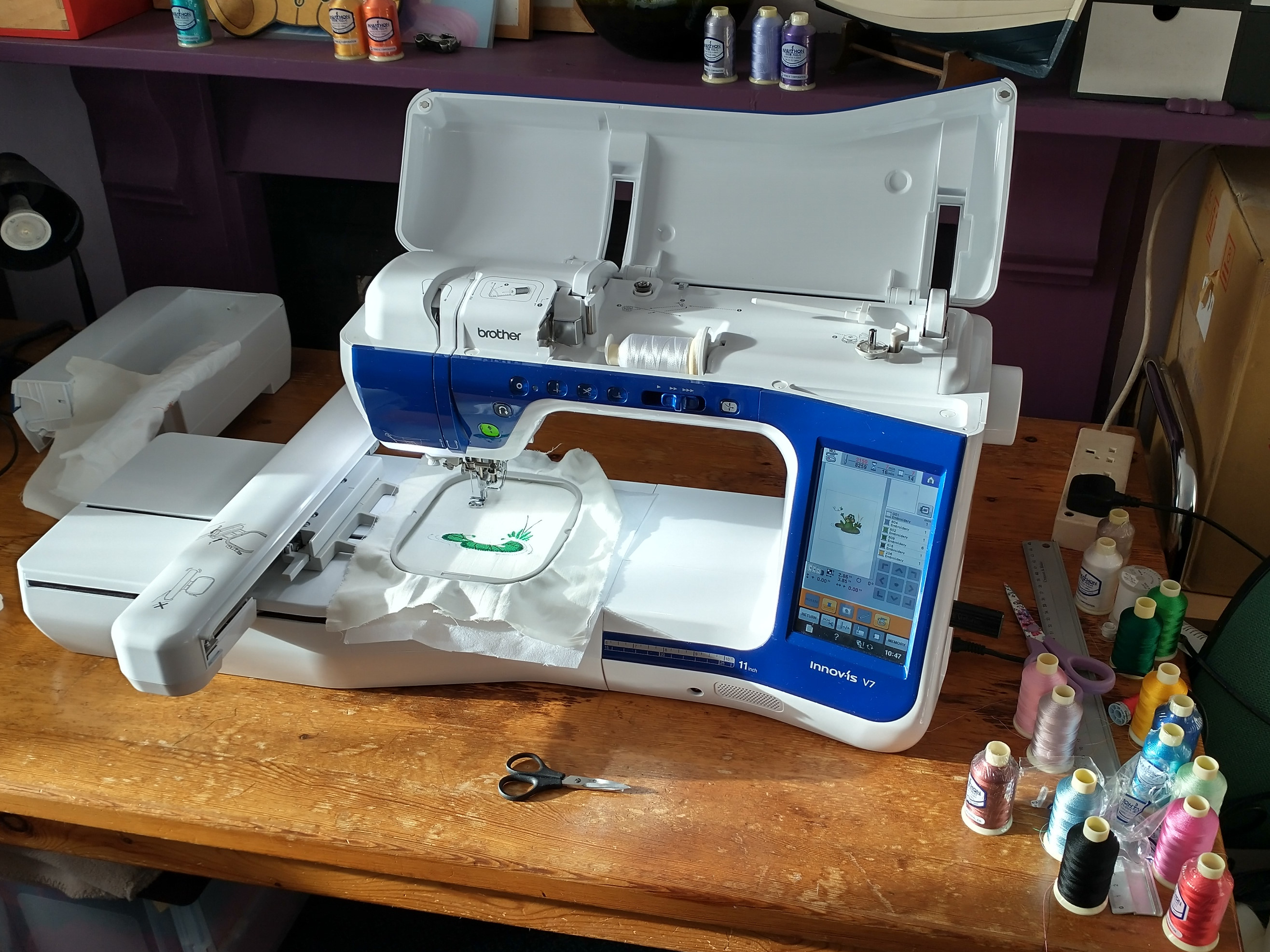
Brother Innov-is V7 computerised Sewing/Quilting/Embroidery machine embroidering onto cloth held in a hoop

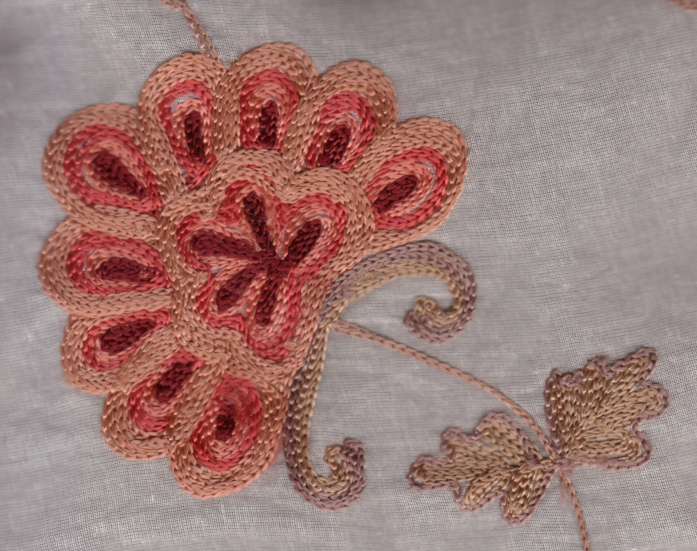
Commercial machine embroidery in chain stitch on a voile curtain, China, early 21st century

Mass-produced machine embroidery emerged in the early 20th century. As embroidery shifted from personalized craft to mechanical output during the Industrial Revolution, the craft developed into a structured industry centered on large-scale production. The first embroidery machine was the hand embroidery machine, invented in France in 1832 by Josué Heilmann. The next evolutionary step was the schiffli embroidery machine. The latter borrowed from the sewing machine and the Jacquard loom to fully automate its operation. The manufacture of machine-made embroideries in St. Gallen in eastern Switzerland flourished in the latter half of the 19th century. Both St. Gallen, Switzerland, and Plauen, Germany, were important centers for machine embroidery and embroidery machine development. Many Swiss and Germans immigrated to Hudson county, New Jersey in the early 20th century and developed a machine embroidery industry there. Shiffli machines have continued to evolve and are still used for industrial scale embroidery.

Contemporary embroidery is stitched with a computerized embroidery machine using patterns digitized with embroidery software. In machine embroidery, different types of "fills" add texture and design to the finished work. Machine embroidery is used to add logos and monograms to business shirts or jackets, gifts, and team apparel as well as to decorate household items for the bed and bath and other linens, draperies, and decorator fabrics that mimic the elaborate hand embroidery of the past.

Machine embroidery is most typically done with rayon thread, although polyester thread can also be used. Cotton thread, on the other hand, is prone to breaking and is avoided.

There has also been a development in freehand machine embroidery, new machines have been designed that allow for the user to create free-motion embroidery which has its place in textile arts, quilting, dressmaking, home furnishings and more. Users can use the embroidery software to digitize the digital embroidery designs. These digitized design are then transferred to the embroidery machine with the help of a flash drive and then the embroidery machine embroiders the selected design onto the fabric.

== Art therapy ==
In recent years, embroidery has increasingly been used as a form of art therapy, due to its ability to support emotional regulation and overall mental wellbeing. For example, embroidery can be adopted to different therapeutic needs, as it allows for both structure and open-ended approaches. While pattern-based work has been shown to provide a sense of stability and support emotional regulation, freestyle embroidery encourages relaxation and creative freedom, making it responsive to changing emotional states. Additionally, the practice of slow threading and repetitive motion ensues a calming process within a persons mind, allowing for reflection. As a historically rooted practice, embroidery invokes a grounding state, while providing space for introspection related to identity, memorabilia, and culture.

== Gallery ==
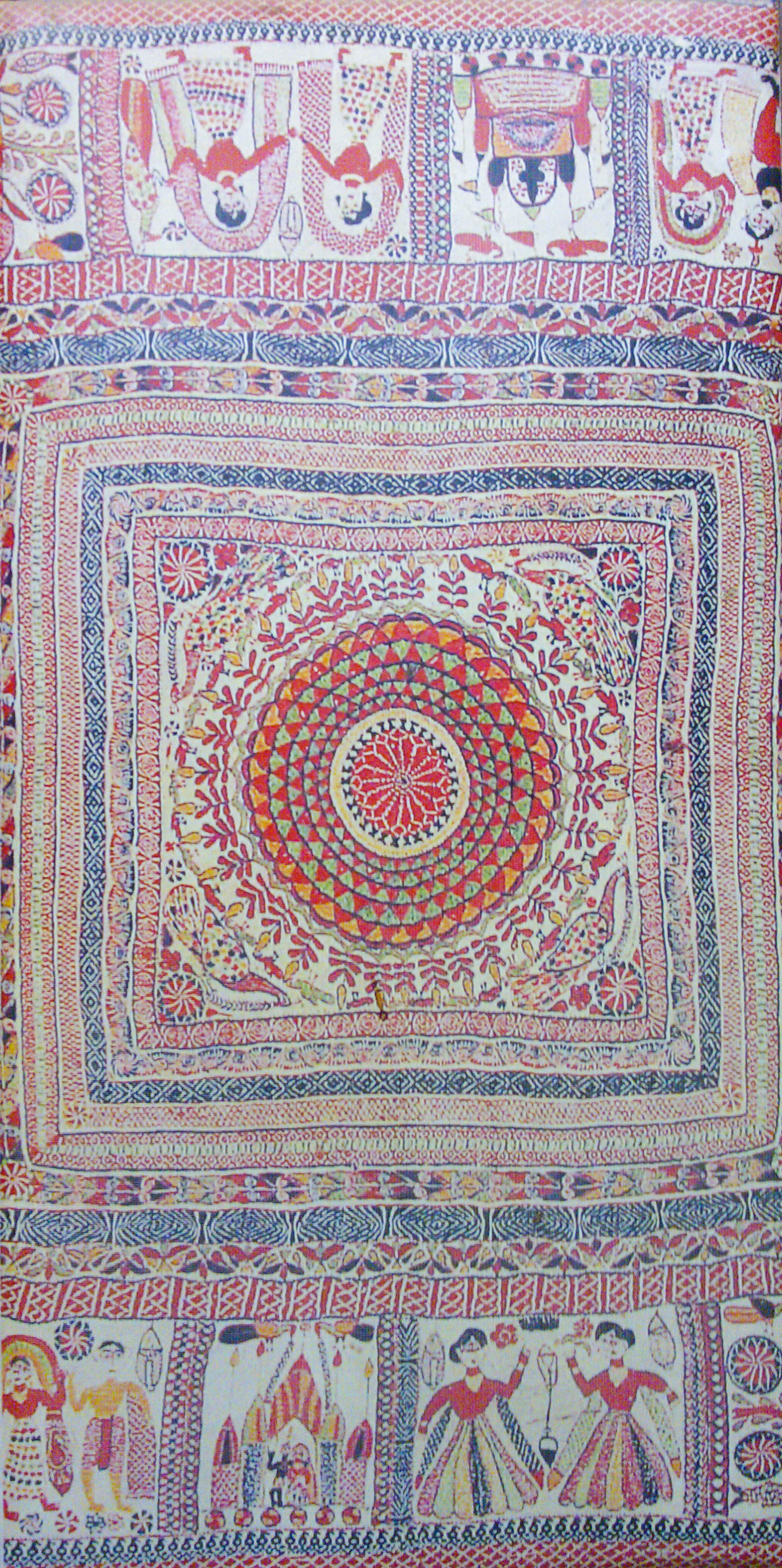
Nakshi Kantha from Sonargaon, Bangladesh Folk Arts and Crafts Foundation

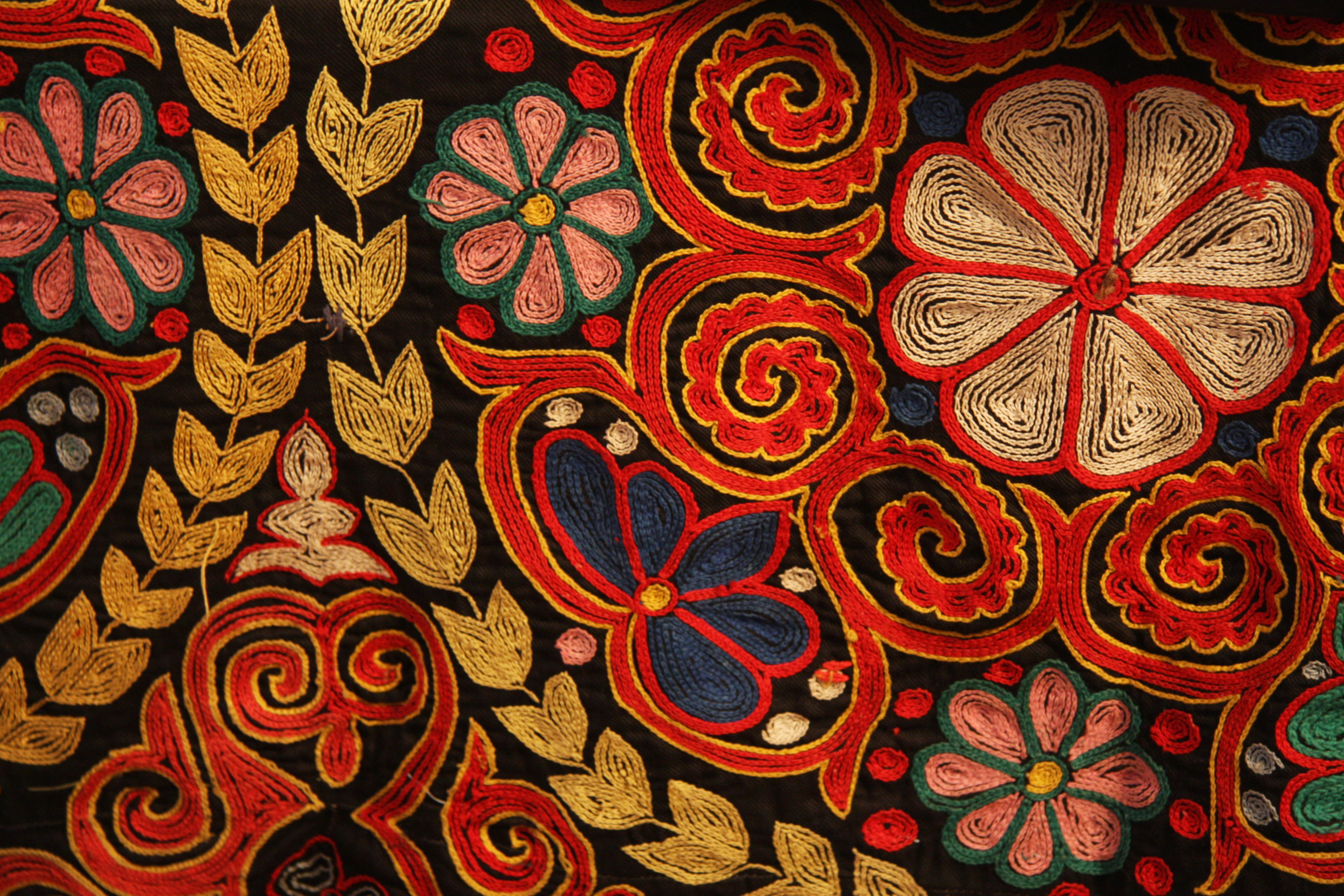
Traditional embroidery in chain stitch on a Kazakh rug, contemporary

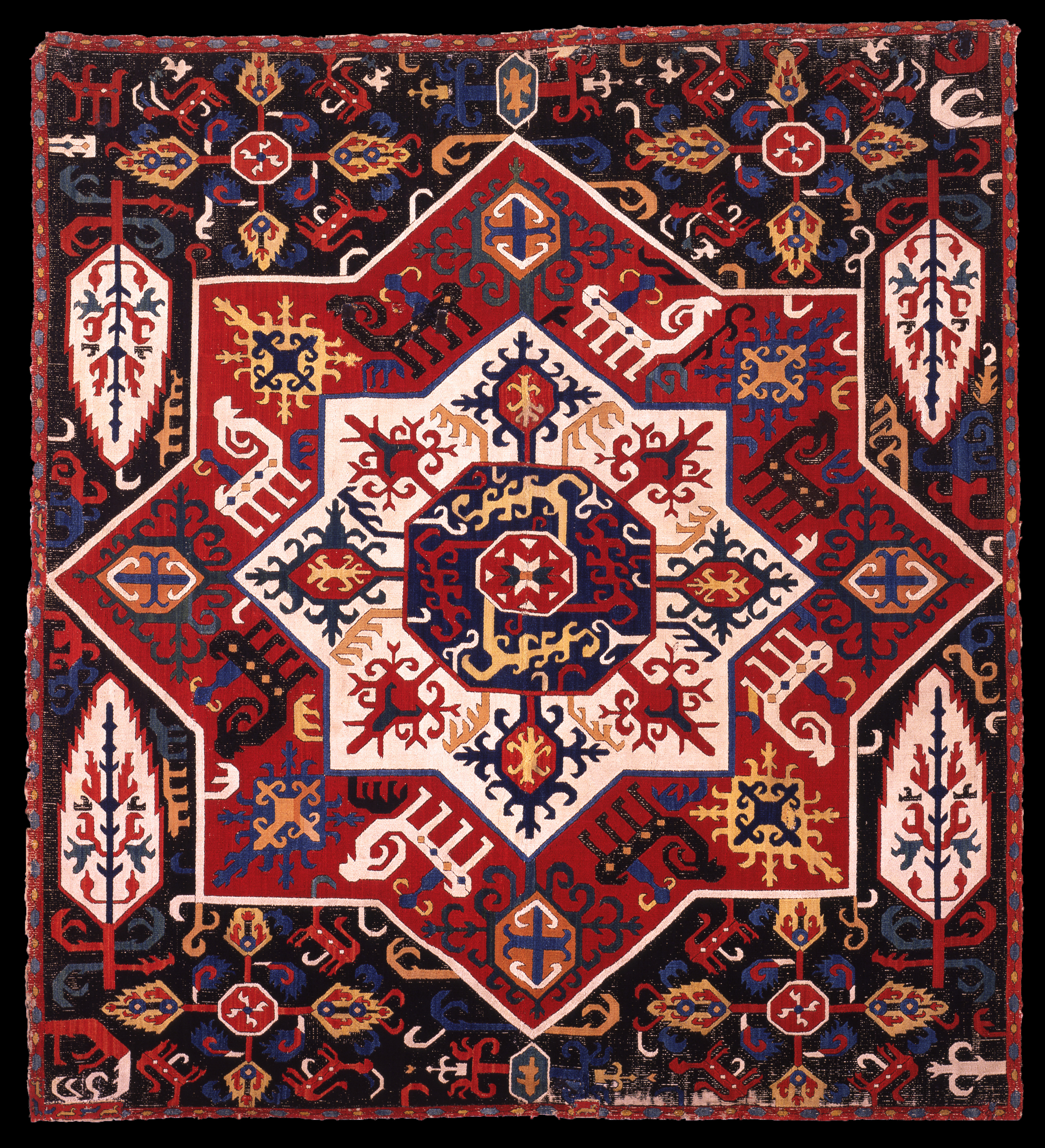
Caucasian embroidery

English cope, late 15th or early 16th century. Silk velvet embroidered with silk and gold threads, closely laid and couched. Contemporary Art Institute of Chicago textile collection.

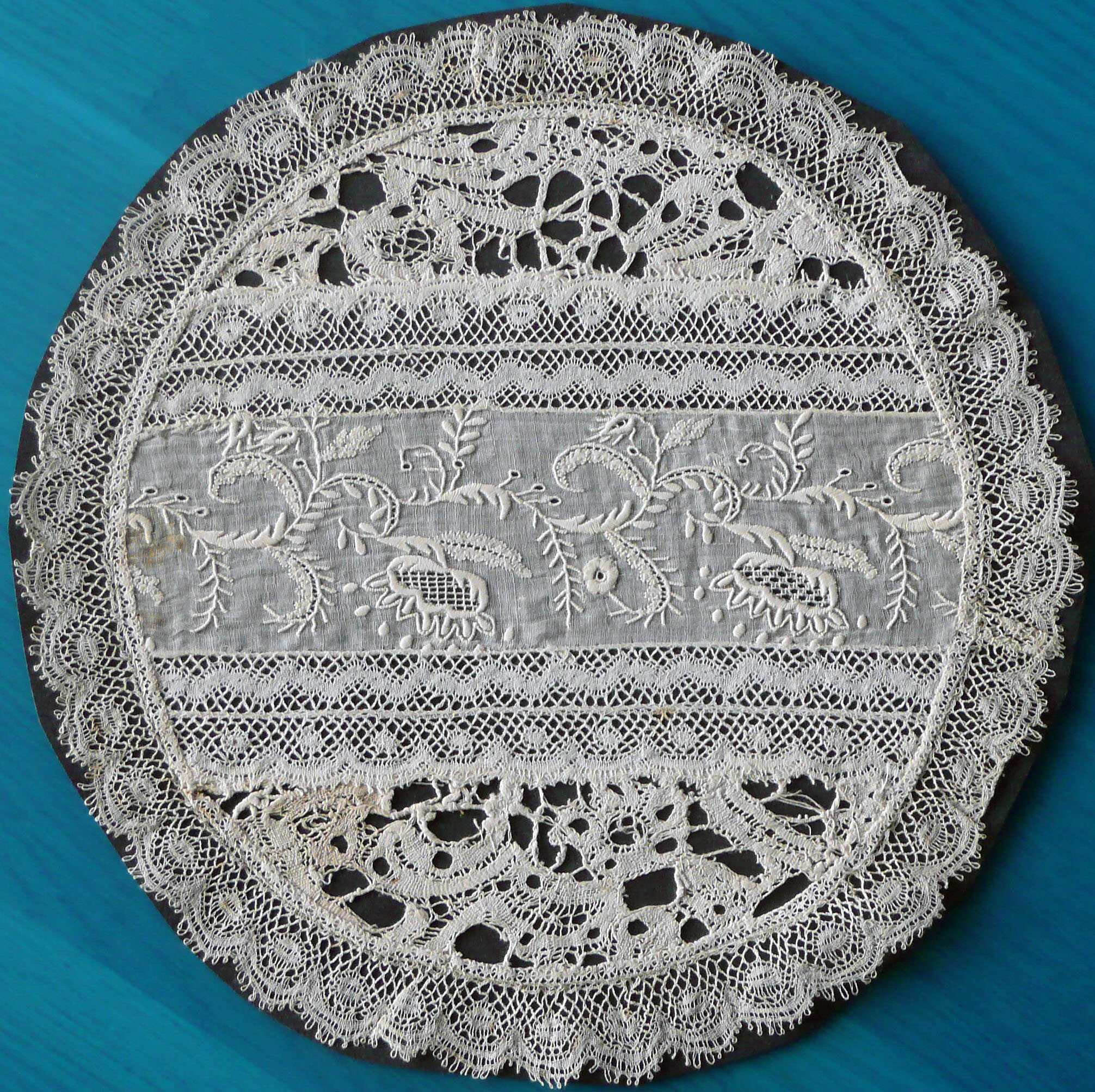
Extremely fine underlay of St. Gallen Embroidery

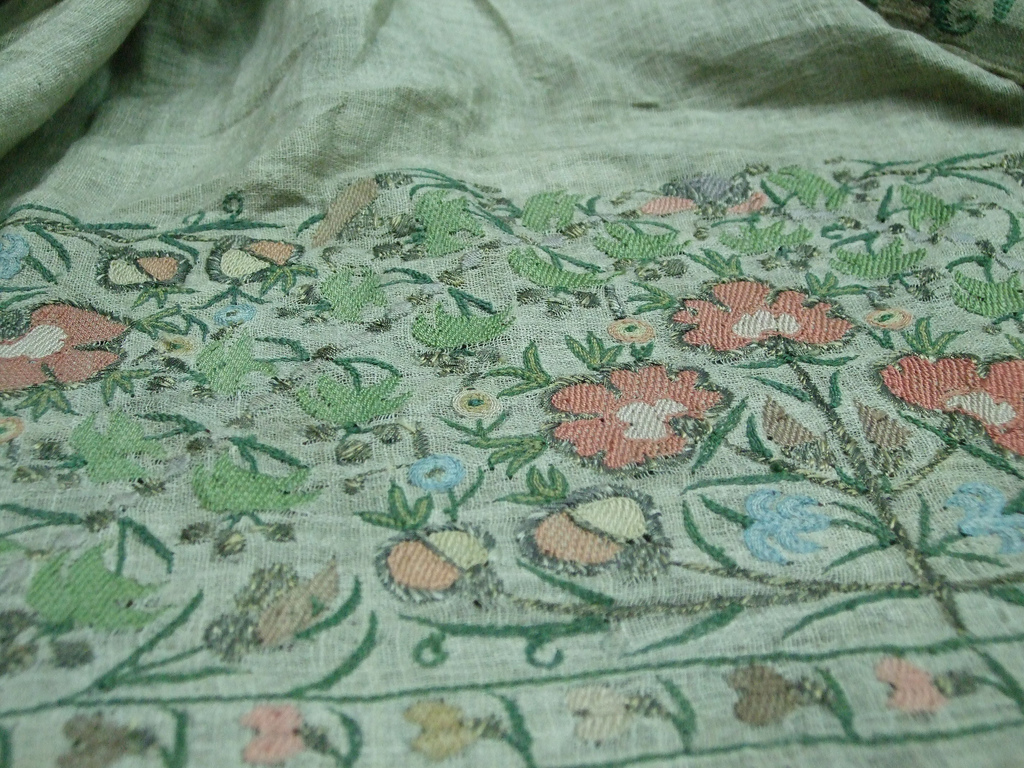
Traditional Turkish embroidery. Izmir Ethnography Museum, Turkey

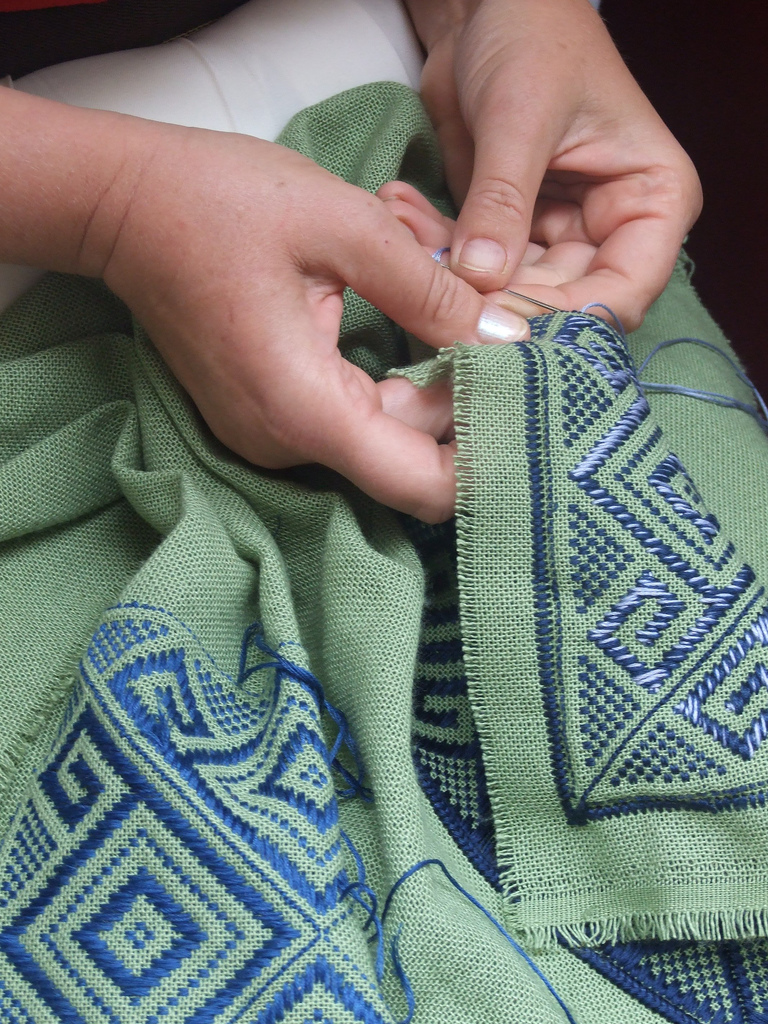
Traditional Croatian embroidery

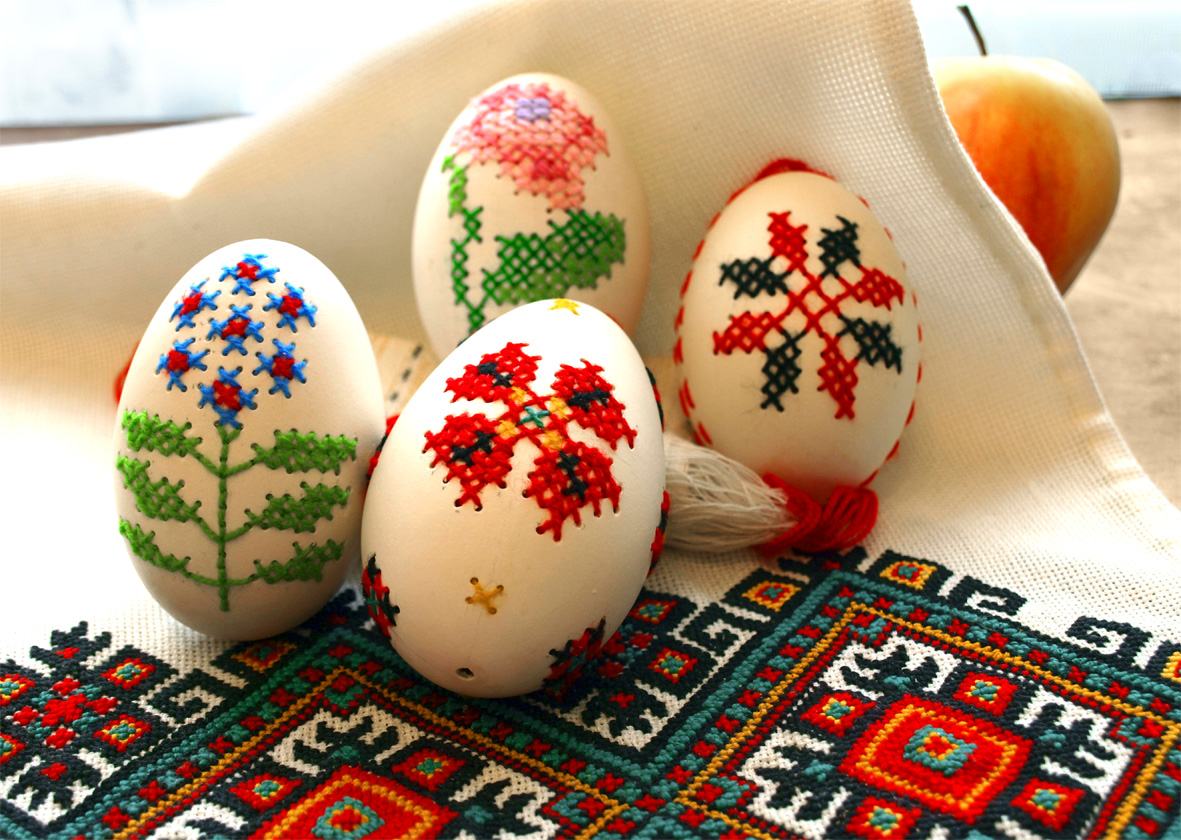
Decorated Easter eggs from the Luhansk region of Ukraine

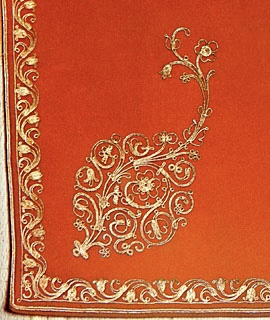
Gold embroidery on a gognots (apron) of a 19th-century Armenian bridal dress from Akhaltsikhe

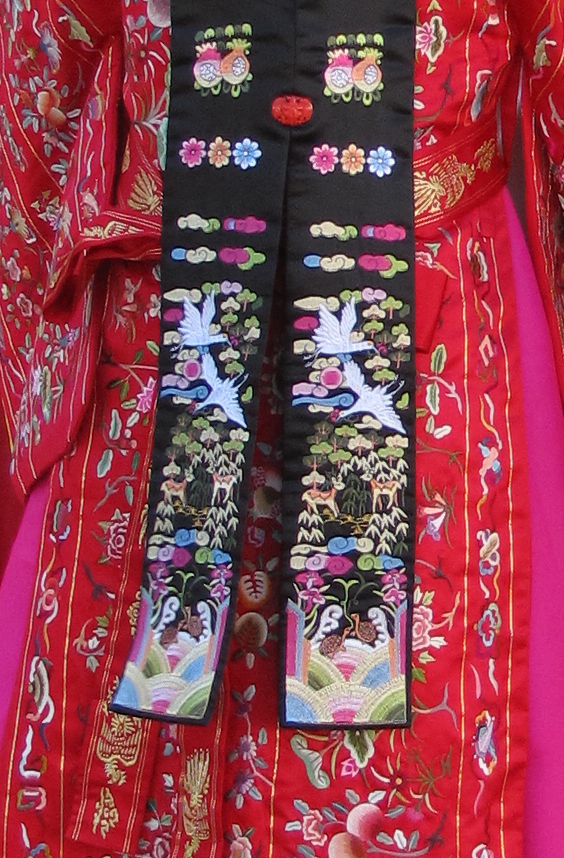
Brightly coloured Korean embroidery

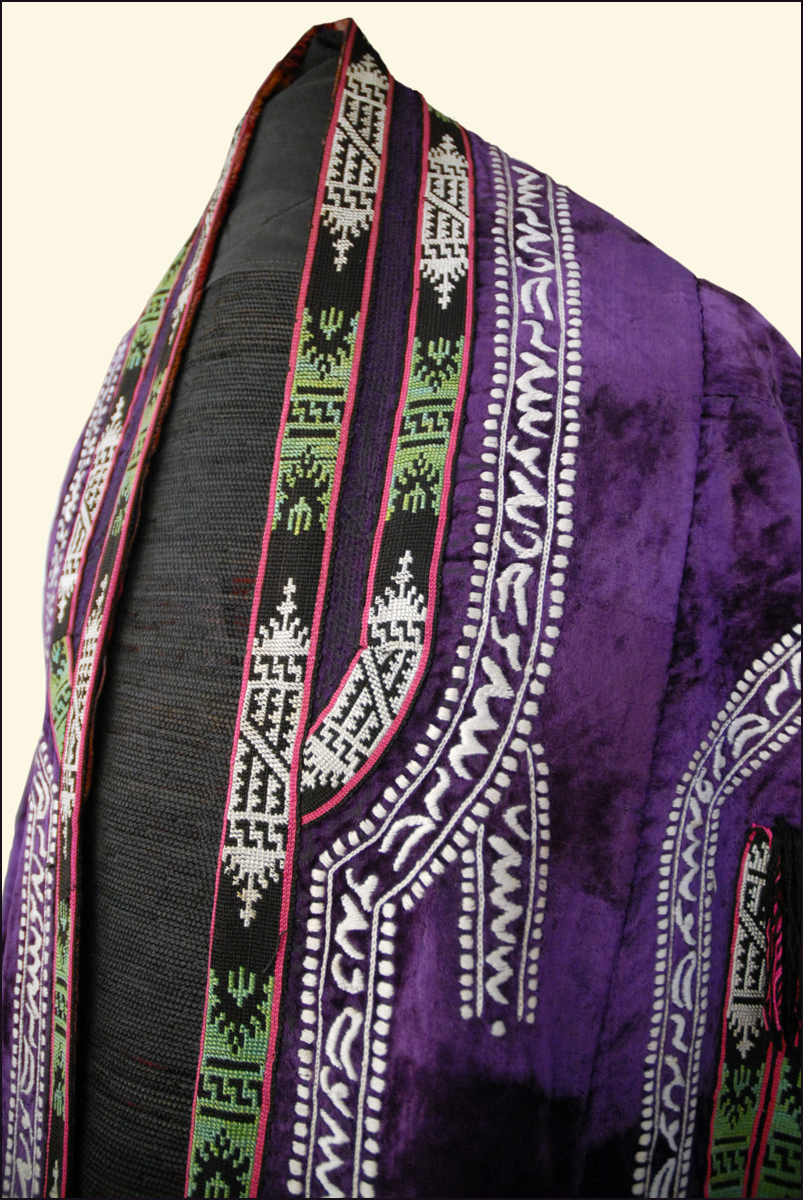
Uzbekistan embroidery on a traditional women's parandja robe

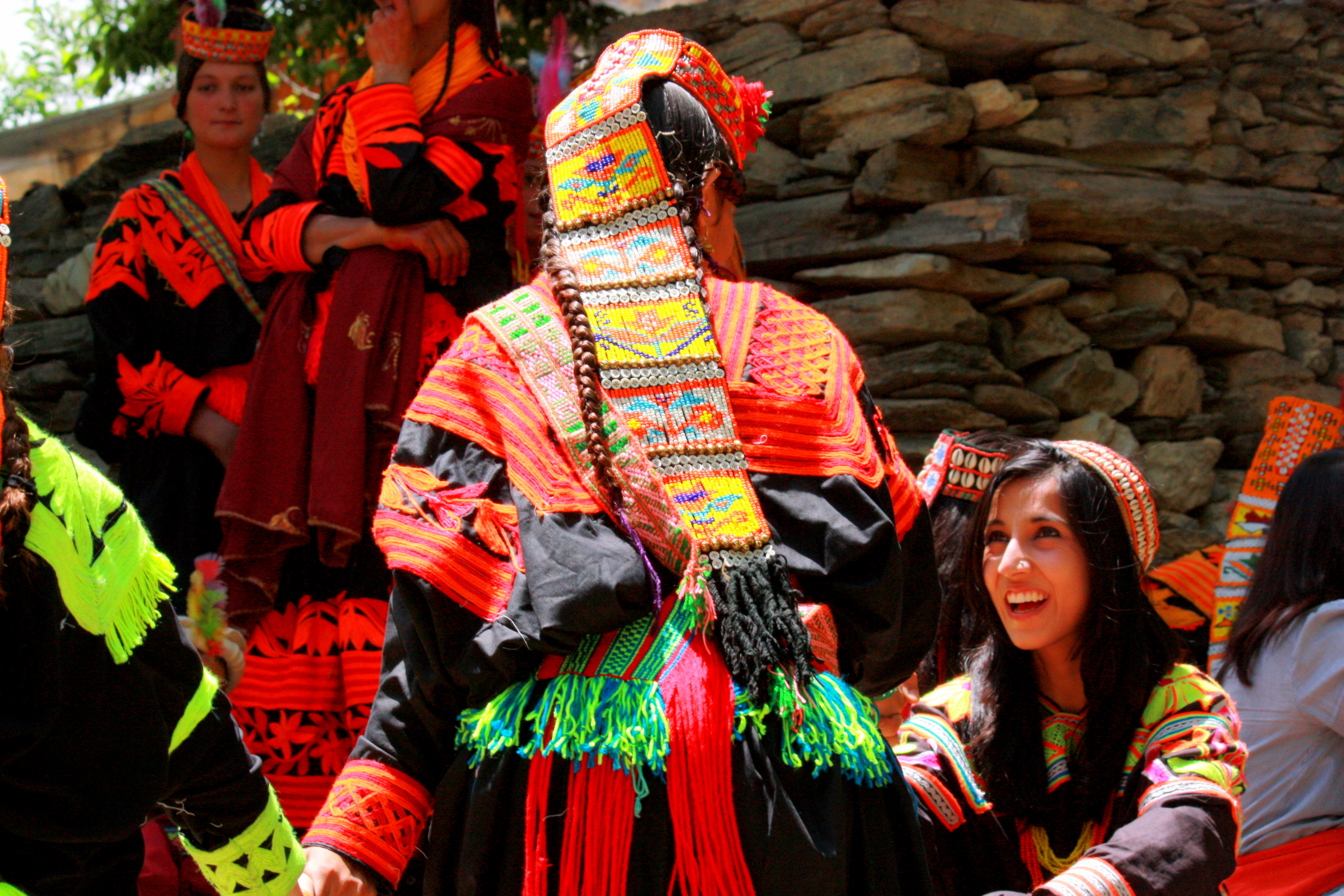
Woman wearing a traditional embroidered Kalash headdress, Pakistan

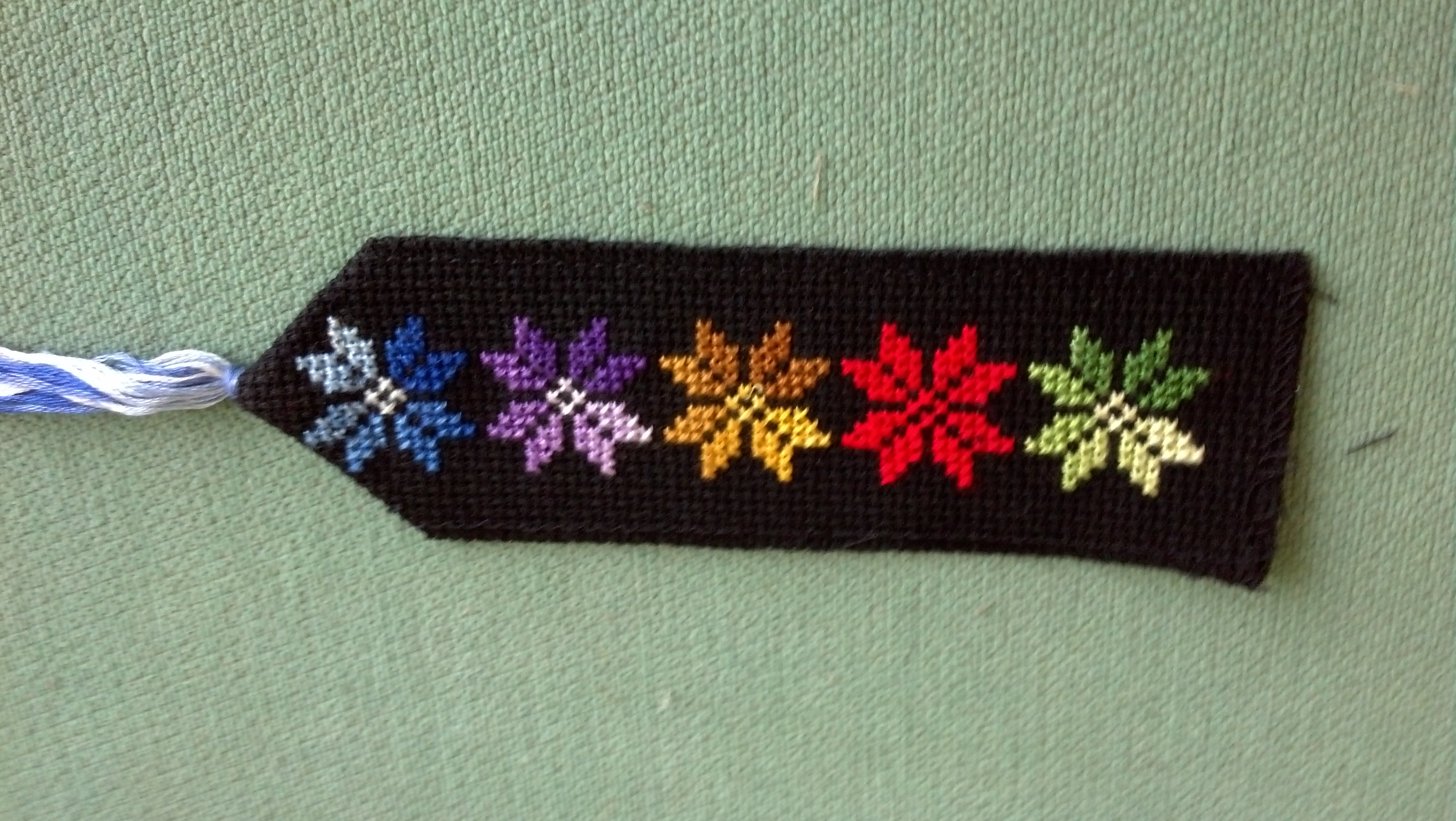
Bookmark of black fabric with multicolored Bedouin embroidery and tassel of embroidery floss

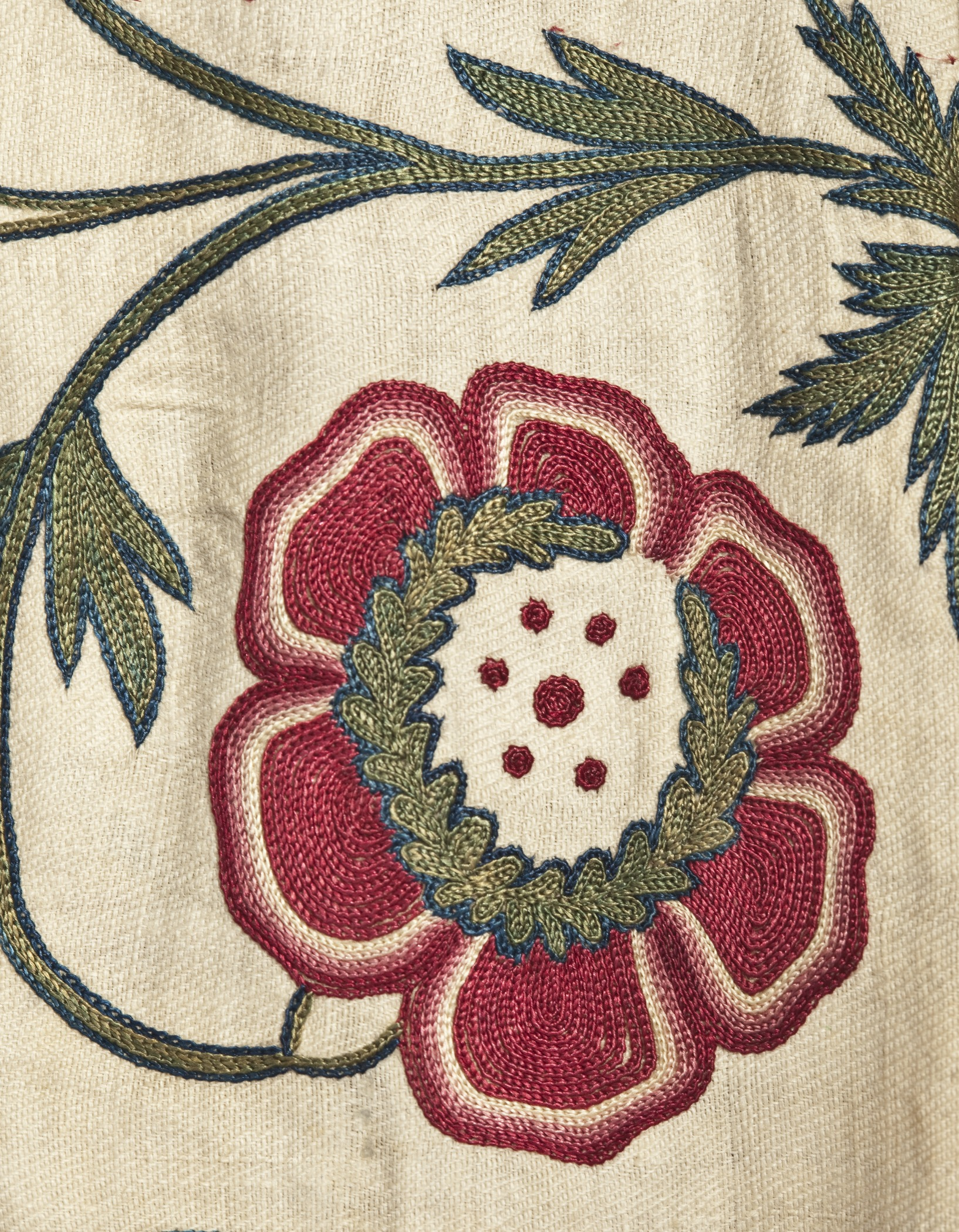
Chain-stitch embroidery from England c. 1775

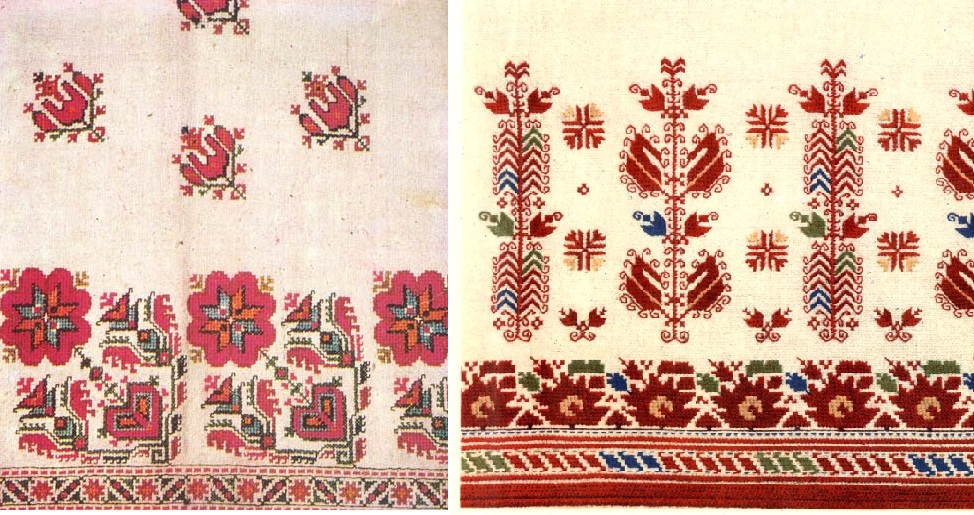
Traditional Bulgarian Floral embroidery from Sofia and Trun

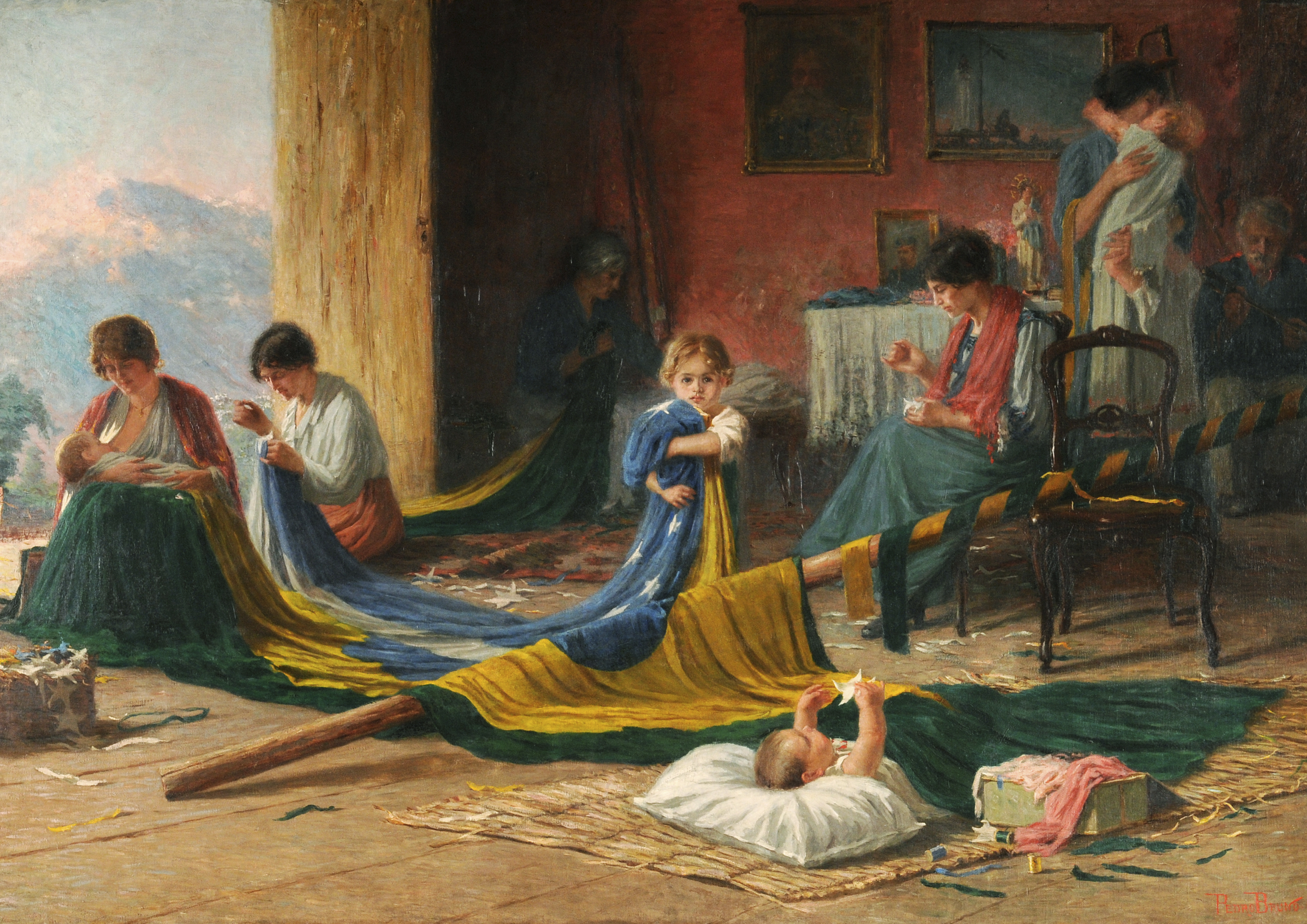
A 1919 painting depicting the Brazilian flag being embroidered by a family

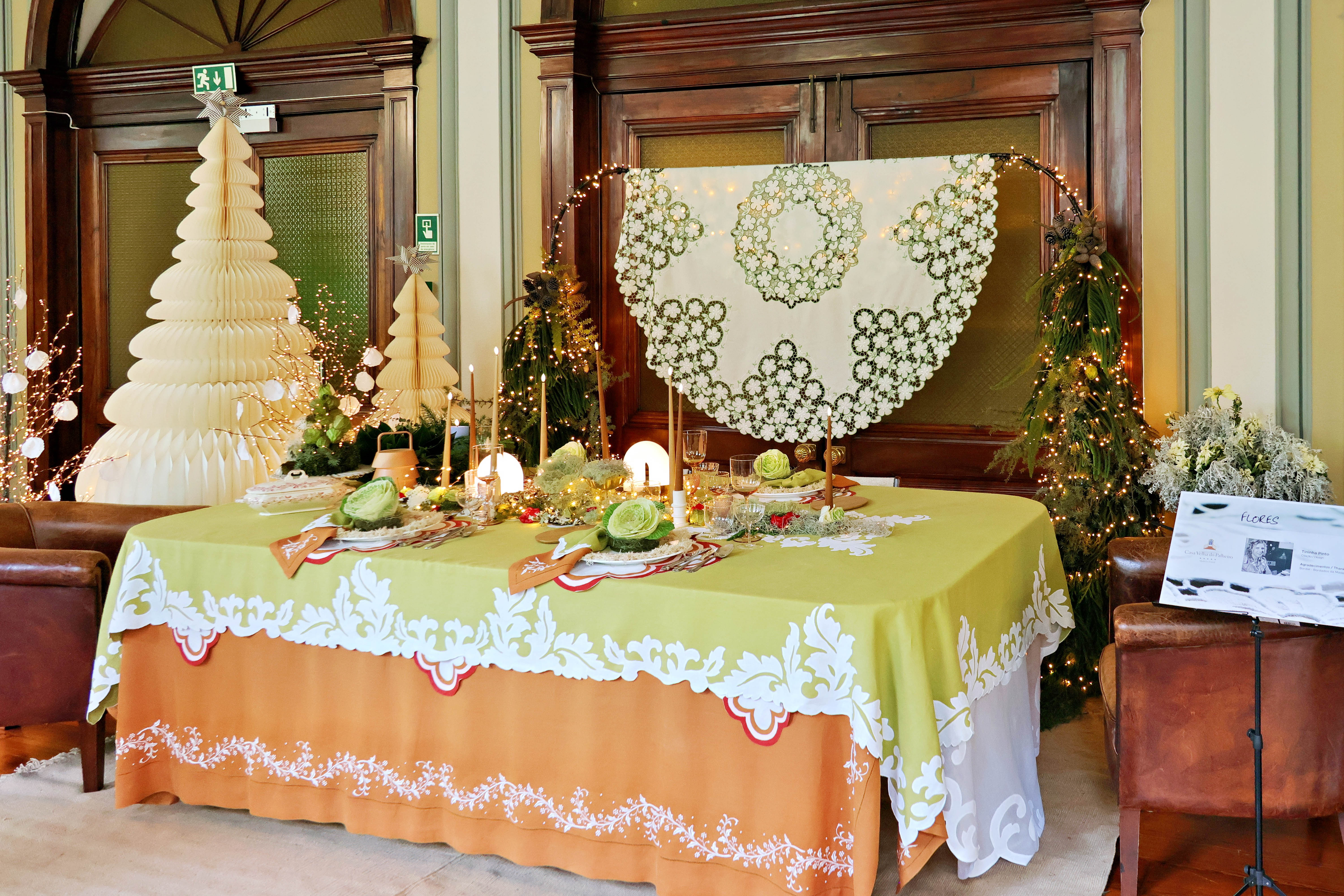
Exhibition in Funchal about tablecloths made with Madeiran embroidery

== See also ==
- Broderie de Fontenoy-le-Château – Museum in Vosges, France
- Chikankari – Traditional embroidery style from Lucknow, India
- Chinese embroidery – Any of the various embroidery techniques of China
- Embroidery of India – Any of the various styles of embroidery indigenous to India
- Khamak – Type of embroidery in Afghanistan
- Mary Ann Beinecke Decorative Art Collection – Research collection of art
- Sachet (scented bag) – Small cloth scented bag filled with herbs
- Sampler (needlework) – Textile artwork used to display skills and techniques

== Notes ==
=== Bibliography ===
- Gillow, John; Sentance, Bryan (1999). World Textiles. Bulfinch Press/Little, Brown. ISBN 0-8212-2621-5.
- Levey, S. M.; King, D. (1993). The Victoria and Albert Museum's Textile Collection Vol. 3: Embroidery in Britain from 1200 to 1750. Victoria and Albert Museum. ISBN 1-85177-126-3.
- Netherton, Robin; Owen-Crocker, Gale R., eds. (2005). Medieval Clothing and Textiles, Volume 1. Boydell Press. ISBN 1-84383-123-6.
- Complete Guide to Needlework. Reader's Digest. 1979. ISBN 0-89577-059-8.
- van Niekerk, Di (2006). A Perfect World in Ribbon Embroidery and Stumpwork. Search Press. ISBN 1-84448-231-6.
