= Shahin Ebrahimzadeh-Pezeshki =

Iranian textile art historian and artist (born 1958)

- شاهین ابراهیم زاده پزشکی
- Born: c. 1958 (age 67–68); Mashhad, Razavi Khorasan province, Iran
- Other names: Shaheen Pezeshki, Shahin Pezeshki
- Occupations: Needleworker, textile artist, textile art historian, textile and costume researcher, curator, educator, university department head, author

Shahin Ebrahimzadeh-Pezeshki (Persian: شاهین ابراهیم زاده پزشکی; born c. 1958), is an Iranian textile art historian, needleworker and textile artist, researcher, curator, educator, and author. Her focus is on the study of Persian traditional costumes and Iran’s tribal costumes. She is the head of faculty at Karaj University of Art.

== Biography ==
Shahin Ebrahimzadeh-Pezeshki was born in c. 1958 in Mashhad, Razavi Khorasan province, Iran.

Ebrahimzadeh-Pezeshki is the Dean (head of a faculty) of the traditional Iranian garments faculty of the Karaj University of Art in Karaj, Iran. She has also worked in educational radio and television, and in documentary film. Her work as a textile artist and needleworker includes many techniques such as Sermeh embroidery, Iranian silk embroidery, and modern methods of sewing with Iranian motifs and designs. She has published multiple books on Iranian handicraft in the Persian language, most notably "طرح هایی برای سوزن دوزی" (English: Designs for Needlework) (Angeh Qalam Publishing House, 2016).

In 2017, Ebrahimzadeh-Pezeshki curated the exhibition "Colors of Diversity: The Ethnic Dresses of Iran", which highlighted the handcrafted traditional clothing at the University of Santo Tomas (UST) in Manila, Rizal Park in Manila, and the University of the Philippines Diliman. The “Colors of Diversity,” included the traditional clothing from 25 regions of Iran including Sistani clothing (featuring Sistan embroidery), Kurdish clothing, and Turkamen clothing. The exhibit was brought to the Philippines in a partnership with the Embassy of Islamic Republic of Iran-Manila and the universities.

In 2010, she was award the title, "the best researcher of Khorasan Razavi province" by the Khorasan Razavi Governorate.

== See also ==
- Persian clothing
- Fashion in Iran
- Jasleen Dhamija
- Irene Emery
