= Candlewick =

Candlewick may refer to:

- Candle wick, a part of a candle or oil lamp
- Candlewick, a style of glassware made by the Imperial Glass Company
- Candlewick (fabric), a thick, soft cotton fabric
- Candlewick, an element in financial candlestick charts
- Candlewick (ward), a ward in the City of London
- Candlewick Press, a Massachusetts publisher
- Candlewick (character), a character from the book The Adventures of Pinocchio
