= Achachi (embroidery) =

Type of Bolivian embroidery

Achachi is a type of Bolivian embroidery (bordado) from the Altiplano.
