= Embroidery thread =

Any of several types of thread designed for use in embroidery and related crafts

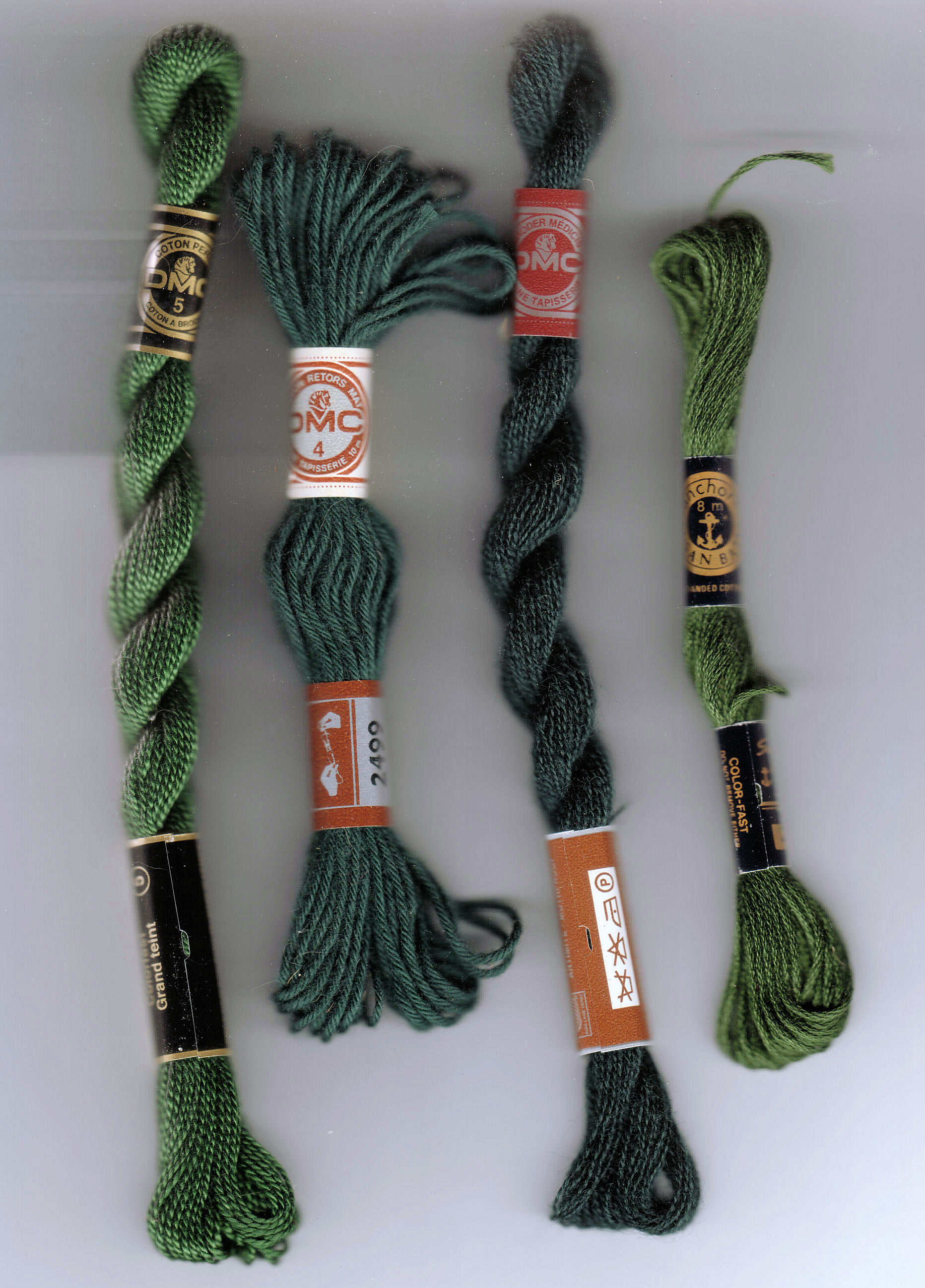
Embroidery thread, left to right: No. 5 perle cotton (coton perlé), matte cotton embroidery yarn, tapestry wool, cotton stranded embroidery floss

Embroidery thread is yarn that is manufactured or hand-spun specifically for embroidery and other forms of needlework. Embroidery thread often differs widely, coming in many different fiber types, colors and weights.

== Type of embroidery thread ==
Threads for hand embroidery include:

=== Crewel yarn ===
- Crewel yarn (also known as crewel wool or French wool) is a fine 2-ply yarn of wool or, less often, a wool-like acrylic. Strands may be separated or combined; it is commonly used for delicate embroidery.

=== Embroidery floss ===
- Embroidery floss or stranded cotton is a loosely twisted, slightly glossy 6-strand thread, usually of cotton but also manufactured in silk, linen, and rayon. Cotton floss is the standard thread for cross-stitch, and is suitable for most embroidery excluding robust canvas embroidery. Extremely shiny rayon floss is characteristic of Brazilian embroidery. The strands of embroidery floss can be separated, and may be used alone or in combination with one another. Historically, stranded silk embroidery threads were described as sleaved or sleided in the 16th century.

=== Filoselle ===
- Filoselle is a historical term for embroidery floss made using the leftover waste from reeled silk.

=== Matte embroidery cotton ===
- Matte embroidery cotton (or its French name, coton à broder) is a matte-finish (not glossy) twisted 5-ply thread.

=== Medici ===
- Medici or broder medici is a fine, light-weight wool thread formerly manufactured by DMC Group.

=== Metallic embroidery threads ===
- Metallic embroidery threads are threads with metallic elements; these may be synthetic or real metal. Metallic threads range from a synthetic yarn with metallic elements worked in, to real precious metal threads that do not feature any yarn at all:
  - Bullion is a hollow metallic thread consisting of wire coiled into a spring, which does not retract when stretched. It can be cut into short lengths and worked like a large bead, and is not pulled through the fabric.
  - Gimp is similar to passing thread, but is of a heavier weight.
  - Lurex thread is an imitation metal thread available in a wide range of colours and finishes. It is soft and easier to work with than real metal thread.
  - Lamé (fabric) can also be used for embroidery. Depending on the composition of the fiber, it can be applied to machine embroidery or hand embroidery.
  - Passing thread (or Japanese gold/silver thread) is a yarn that features a round metallic thread (which may be real silver or gold leaf, or imitation) wound around a core of silk, linen or cotton thread.
  - Plate is a flat, ribbon-like strip of metal that is couched onto fabric using regular thread.
  - Purl is a finer, more closely-twisted version of bullion; it can also be cut into lengths and applied like a bead.

=== Perle cotton ===
- Perle cotton (also known as pearl cotton, or by the French coton perlé) is an S-twisted, 2-ply thread with high sheen, sold in five sizes or weights (No. 3, 5, 8, 12 and 16 (Finca), with 3 being the heaviest and 16 the finest). It is suitable for many different types of embroidery.

=== Persian yarn ===
- Persian yarn (also known as Persian wool) is a loosely twisted 3-strand yarn of wool or acrylic, often used for needlepoint. Each individual strand is 2-ply; the yarn can be separated or combined as required.

=== Silk floss ===
- Silk floss is available in two different types: flat, which has no twist, or only the slightest amount, and twisted.

=== Tapestry yarn ===
- Tapestry yarn or tapestry wool is a tightly twisted 4-ply yarn that is relatively hard-wearing. The strands cannot be separated, and it is similar in weight to worsted yarn.

=== Machine embroidery threads ===
Threads for machine embroidery are usually of polyester or rayon (less often cotton or silk).

== Potential harm and testing ==
Threads, like textiles, can contain compounds that may be harmful to humans. Many dyes have been shown to be allergenic and in some cases carcinogenic. Testing for the presence of these dyes, and other residual substances, can be done at many commercial laboratories.

Certification to the Oeko-tex standard may also be applied for. This tests the component for over 100 different chemicals and certifies the component according to human ecological safety.
