= Khamak (embroidery) =

Type of embroidery in Afghanistan

Khamak is a distinguished embroidery. Embroidery is the usual practice for household textiles by women artisans in Afghanistan. Khamak consists of very complicated designs than other techniques (Such as Gul dozee which is an easier stitch pattern embroidery). They use delicate silk satin stitches on fine woven cloths of cotton or wool fabrics.

== Artwork ==
Khamak is one of the intricate embroidery forms consisting complex natural and geometric designs in repetitive or multiple patterns incorporating a combination of stitch patterns and techniques which demands high skill artisans. For mainly Hazara women in Hazarajat region and Khandahar the embroidery is a natural skill. It is their traditional activity besides weaving and sewing.

== Use ==
The Khamak is mainly used for decorating Hazaragi dresses, many linens such as pillow covers and tablecloths and scarves and shawls.

== See also ==
- Hazara clothing
