= Candlewicking =

Form of embroidery

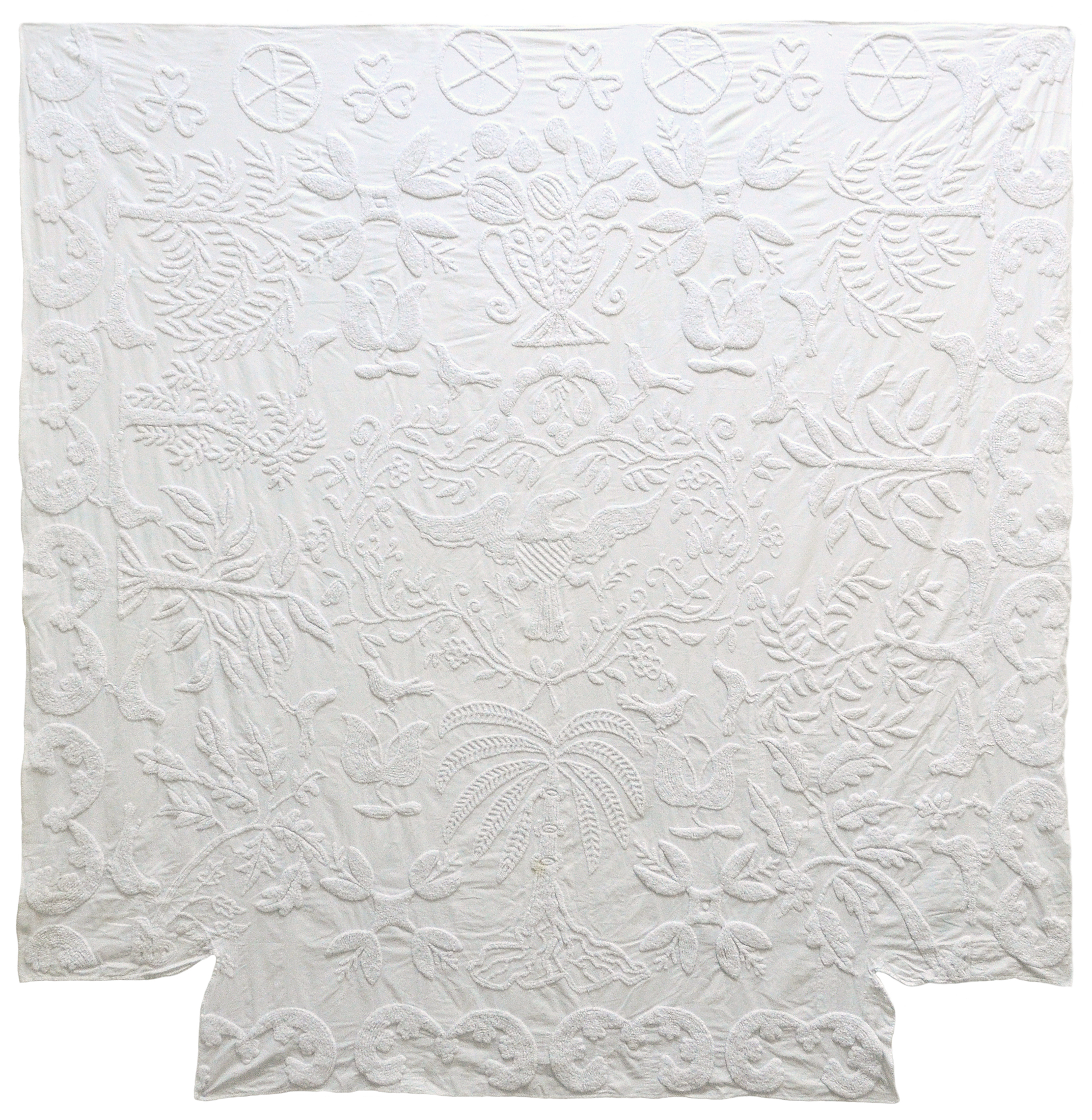
This early American candlewick spread was made for a four-post bed, and includes fanciful botanical motifs, birds, and a central motif with an American eagle. Collection of Bill Volckening.

Candlewicking or candlewick is a form of whitework embroidery that traditionally uses an unbleached cotton thread on a piece of unbleached muslin. It gets its name from the nature of the soft spun cotton thread, which was braided then used to form the wick for candles. Motifs are created using a variety of traditional embroidery stitches as well as a tufted stitch. Subject matter is usually taken from nature—flowers, insects, pine trees, and so on, Other traditional motifs resemble Pennsylvania Dutch or Colonial American designs. Modern designs include colored floss embroidery with the traditional white on white stitching.

Loom-woven or machine-made candlewicks of the early 19th century are white bedcovers with designs created during the weaving process by raising loops over a small tool.

Contemporary candlewicking is most commonly used as a cushion cover.
