= Kalaga =

Heavily embroidered appliqué tapestry indigenous to Myanmar

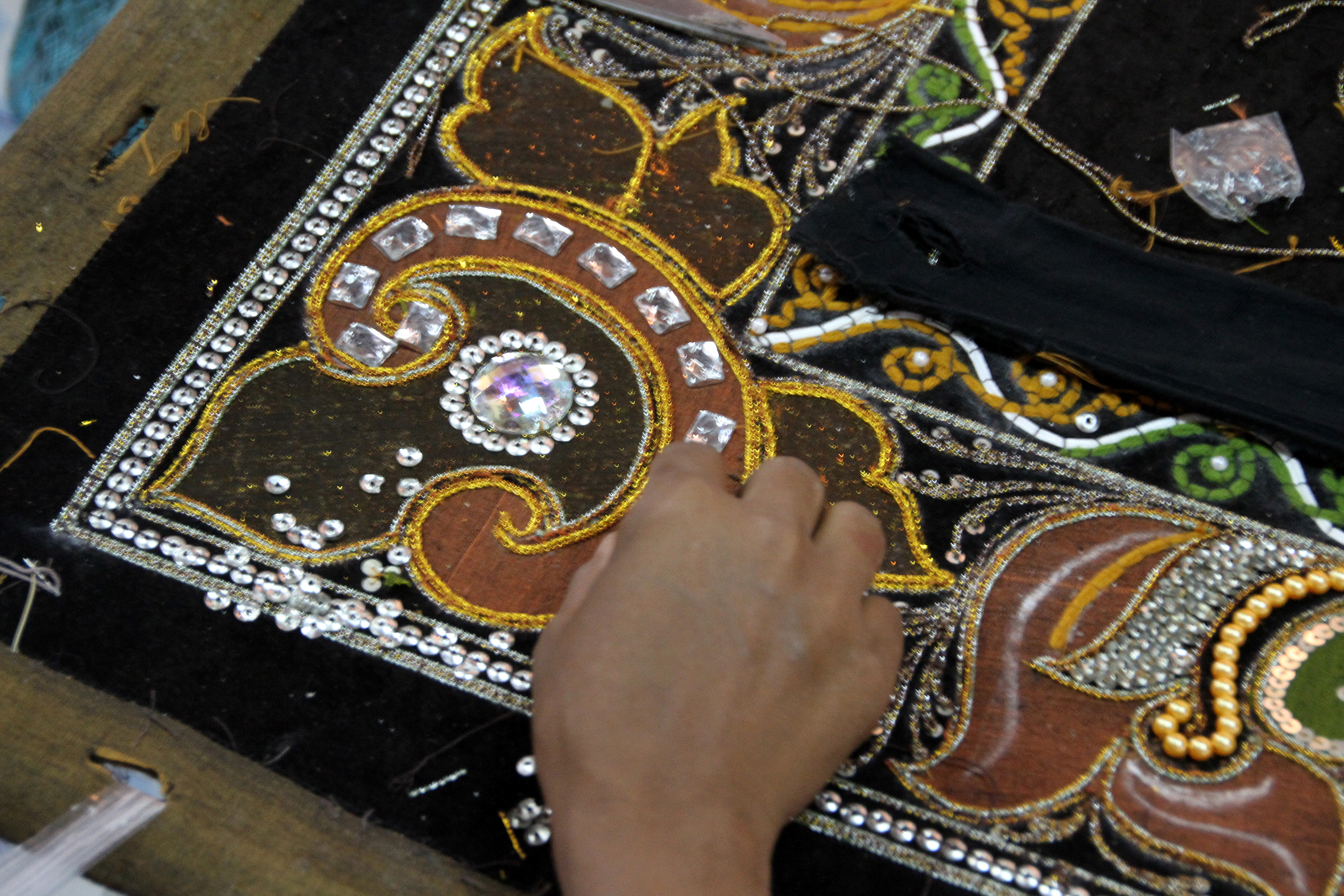
Close-up of an unfinished kalaga.

Kalaga (Burmese: ကန့်လန့်ကာ) is a heavily embroidered appliqué tapestry made of silk, flannel, felt, wool and lace against a background made of cotton or velvet indigenous to Burma (Myanmar). The word kalaga, which means "curtain," comes from the Burmese language, although Burmese refer to such tapestries as shwe gyi do (ရွှေချည်ထိုး; lit. 'gold thread embroidery'). These tapestries use a sewing technique called shwe gyi (ရွှေချည်)

This artform emerged during the Konbaung dynasty in the mid-19th century and reached its zenith during the reign of Mindon Min, when velvet became fashionable at the royal court.

In a typical tapestry, padded figures are cut from various types of cloth and sewn onto a background, usually red or black cloth to form an elaborate scene, traditionally from Burmese classical plays (e.g. Ramayana, Jataka). The figures are sewn using a combination of metallic and plain threads and adorned with sequins, beads and glass stones.

== See also ==
- Culture of Myanmar
