= Sermeh embroidery =

Sermeh embroidery (Persian: سرمه دوزی), also known as Sormeh embroidery, is an Iranian ancient-style of embroidery. Its origin dates back to the Achaemenid dynasty (some 25 centuries ago). It reached its zenith in the Safavid Dynasty. In this style of embroidery, gold and silver threads would be used to make decorating patterns on the surface of fabric; however, nowadays, almost entirely, threads twisted out of cheaper metals and alloys and metal like yarns have replaced gold and silver. The yarn used in patterning is springlike and elastic. Sermeh embroidery is the most popular in the cities of Isfahan, Yazd, Kashan.

== About ==
Sermeh embroidery is used to create table clothes, flags, elaborately embroidered clothing, religious objects, curtains, and many household items. It is thought that clothing was commonly decorated in Sermeh embroidery during the Parthian-era.

Materials used for making Sermeh embroidery textiles can include Termeh cloth, silk, velvet, cotton fabrics and different types of threads. An embroidery hoop or frame to stretch the material while making the patterns are needed. Each single textile may have a variety of stitching techniques including chain stitches, twill stitches, round embroidery stitches, leaf embroidery stitches, spiral stitches, satin stitches, diagonal stitches, fastening stitches, zigzag stitches, mice teeth stitches, and stem embroidery stitches.
