= Vietnamese embroidery =

Traditional craft in Vietnam

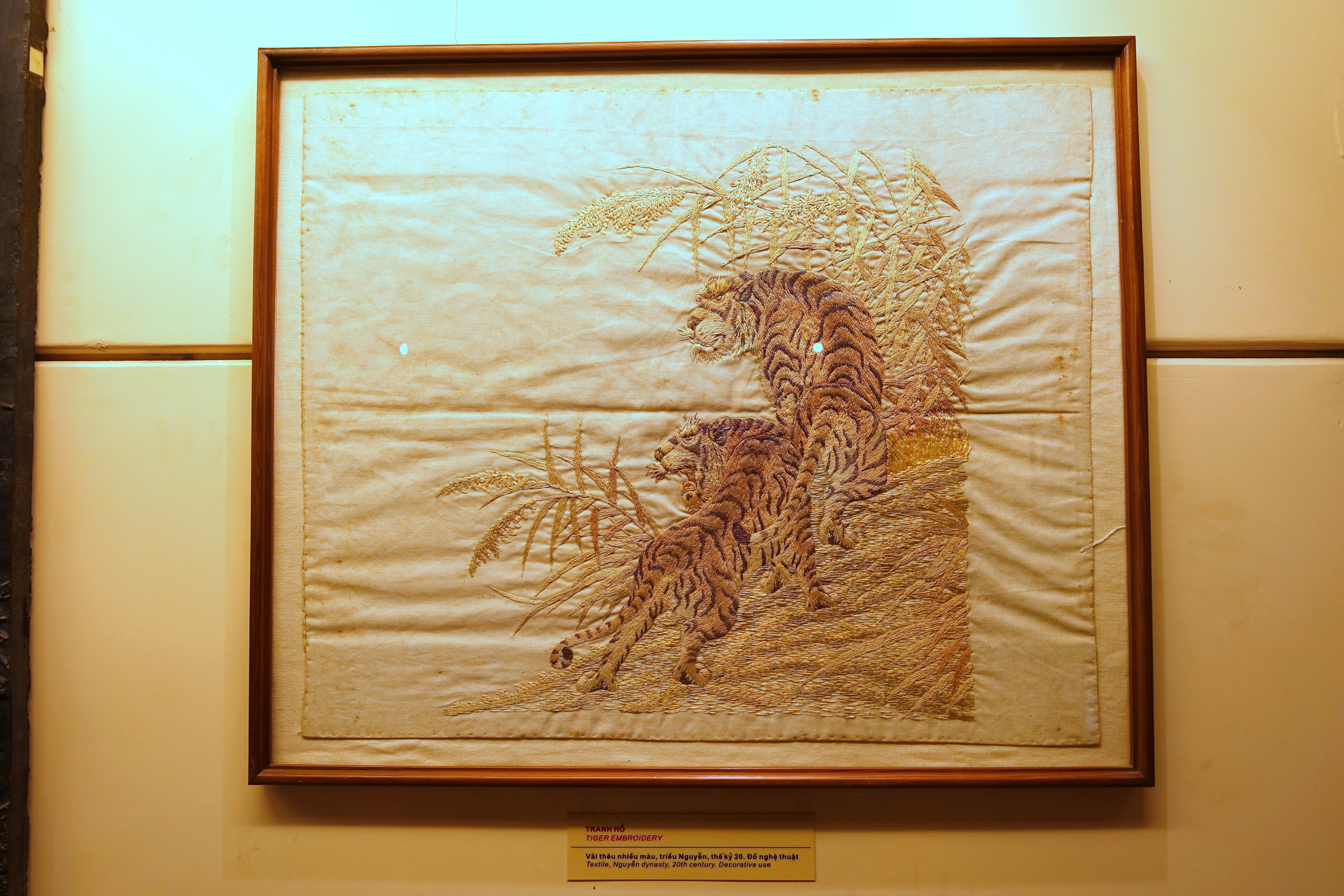
Embroidery painting of two tigers in the Nguyễn dynasty

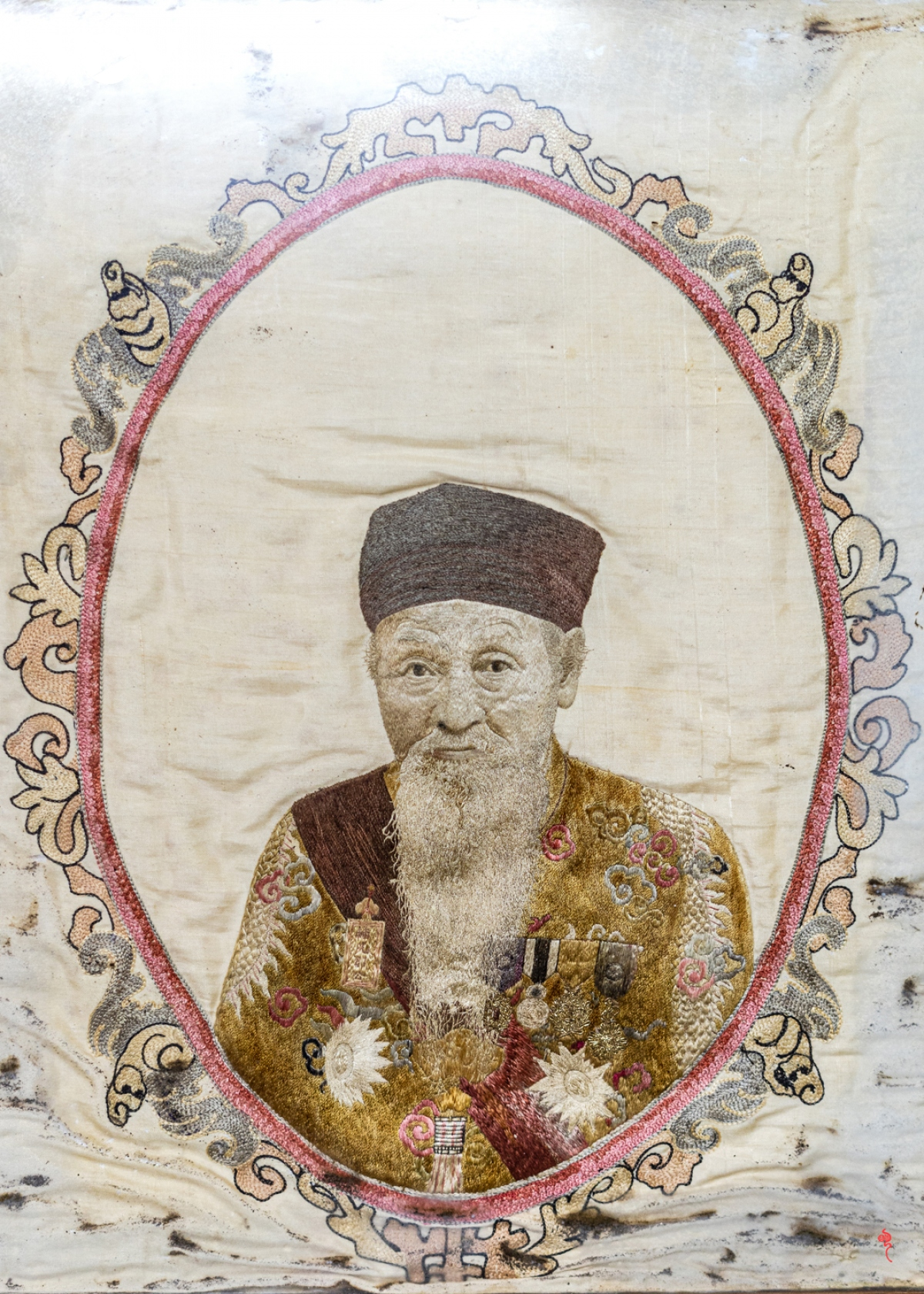
Embroidered portrait of Mr. Tôn Thất Hân

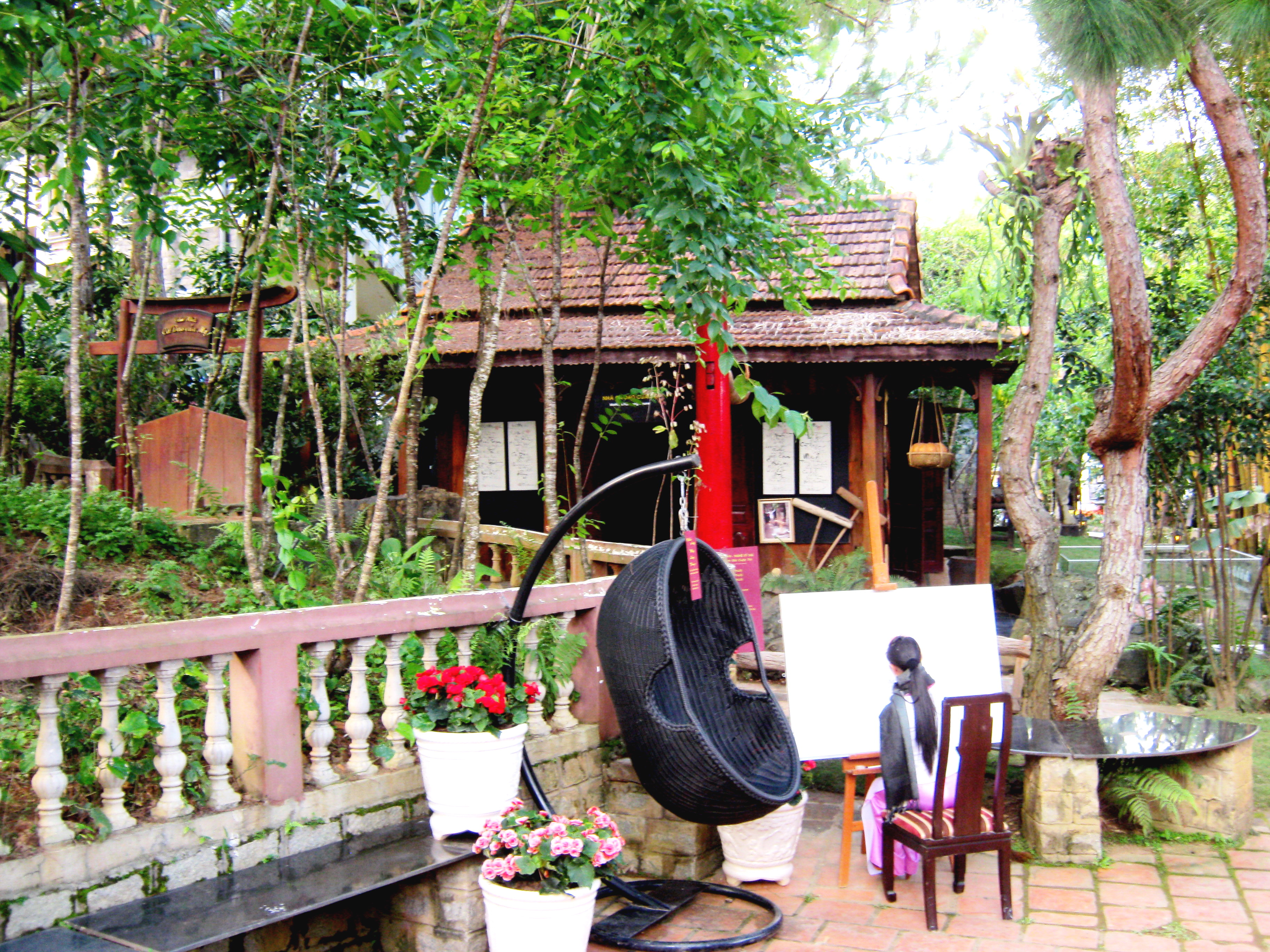
A young woman is embroidering a picture

Vietnamese hand embroidery is a traditional craft dating back 700 years. Usually, tiny threads are used to create brightly coloured pictures on cloth. It is a popular extracurricular activity for young girls in high school. Traditionally, girls are expected to know how to decorate pillowcases, curtains and tablecloths with hand embroidery.

== See also ==
- Culture of Vietnam
