= Brazilian embroidery =

Type of embroidery using high-sheen rayon thread

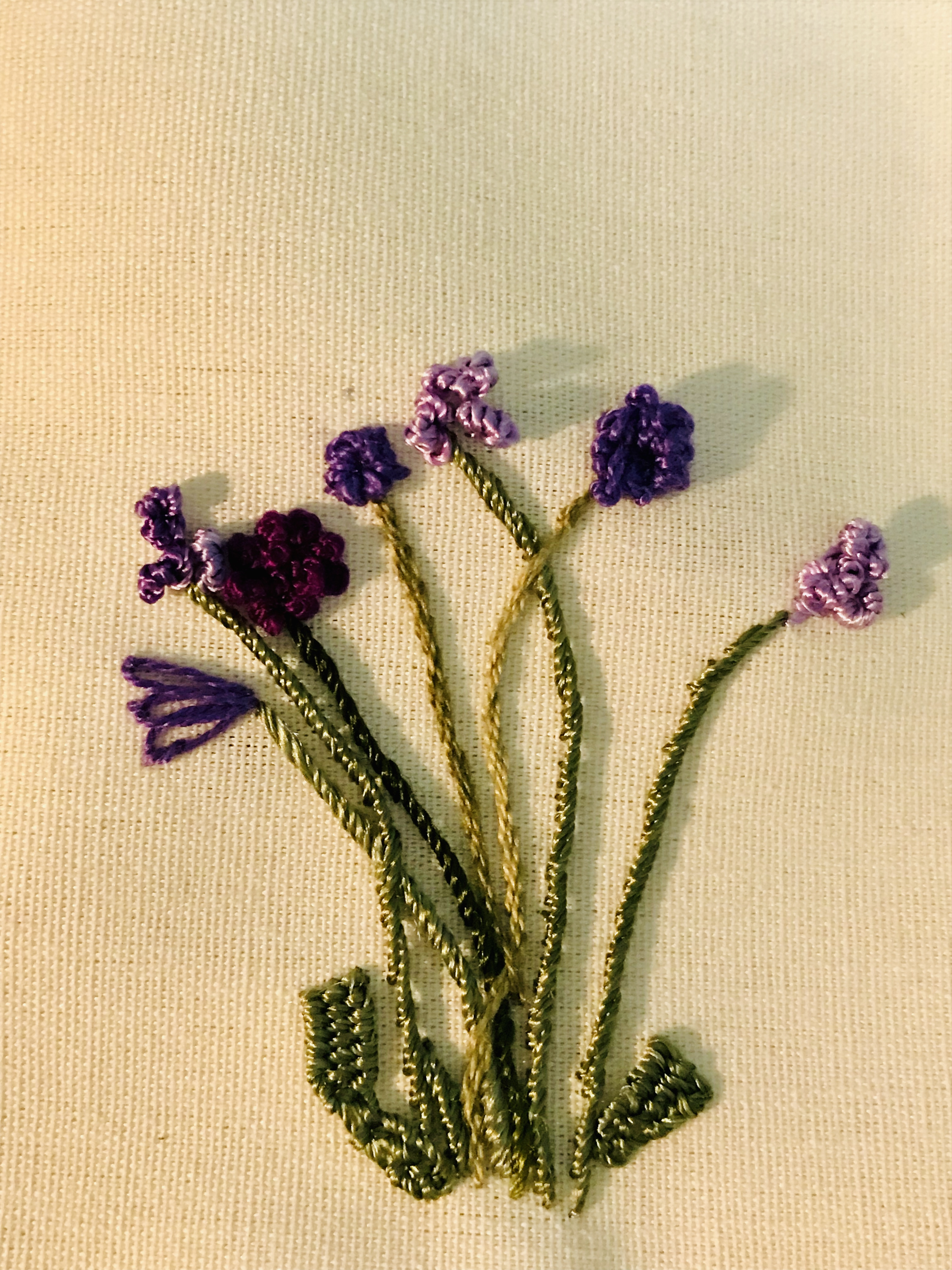
Brazilian Embroidery Flowers made with rayon thread

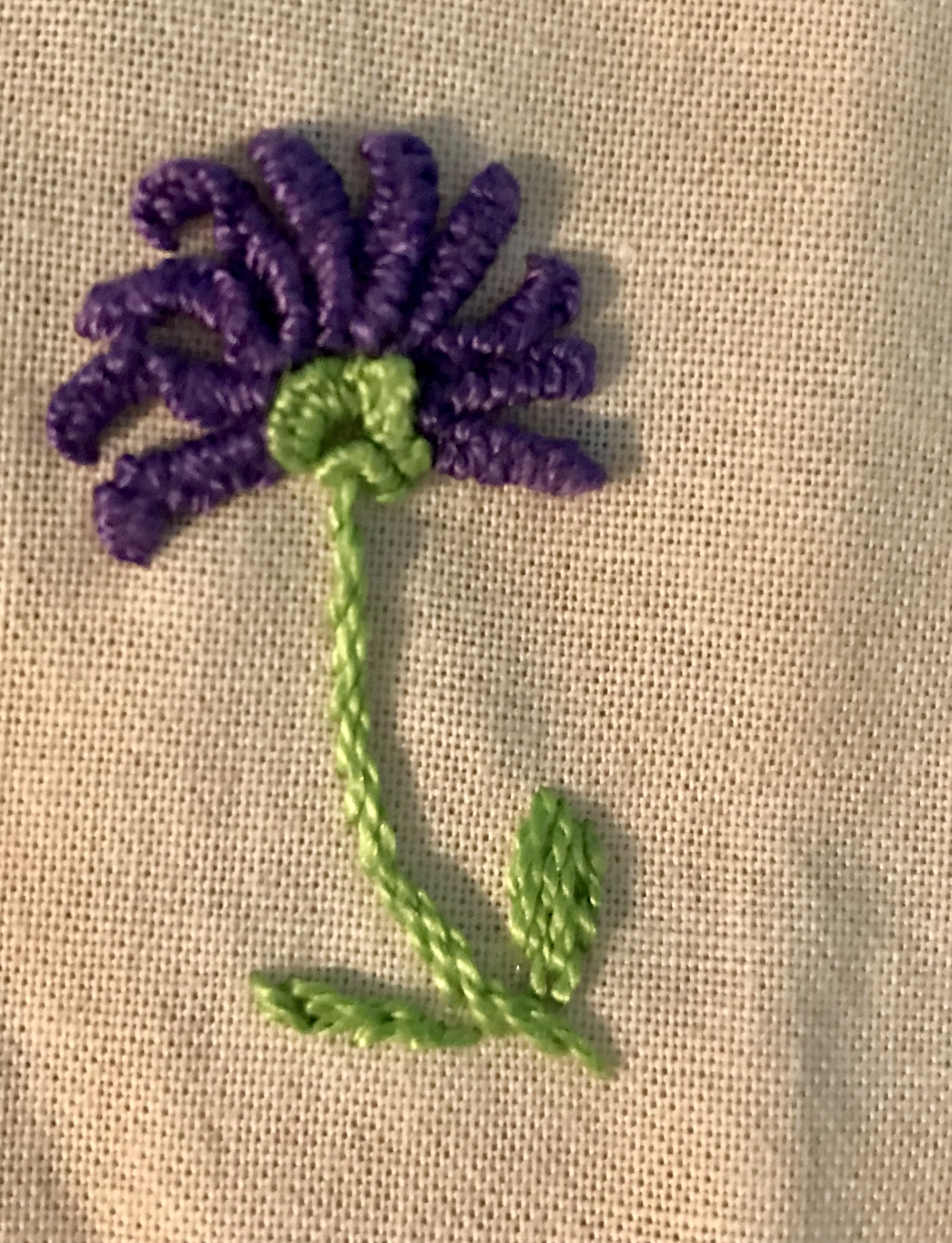
Single Brazilian Embroidery Flower

Brazilian embroidery is a type of surface embroidery that uses rayon thread instead of cotton or wool. It is called "Brazilian" embroidery because the use of high-sheen rayon thread in embroidery was first popularized in Brazil, where rayon was widely manufactured. Brazilian embroidery patterns usually include flowers formed using both knotted and cast on stitches. Rayon thread, which is smooth and shiny, makes it easier to pull the needle through the wrapped stitches, such as bullion stitches. Milliners needles, which have a straight shaft and an eye area no wider than the shaft, are usually used for the wrapped stitches that are frequently used in Brazilian embroidery.

Although many of these stitches are used in other forms of embroidery, the technique used to create them is slightly different. The difference is caused by the method used to manufacture the rayon thread. For example, cotton thread uses an S twist when the fiber plies are combined into a strand. Rayon thread uses a Z twist. One type of twist turns the fiber plies clockwise; the other turns them counterclockwise. When forming the knots of Brazilian embroidery, the embroiderer must wrap the thread onto the needle in the opposite direction from that used in other types of embroidery. Otherwise the fibers of the thread will unravel and make the resulting stitches and knots unattractive.
