= Termeh =

Type of Persian (Iranian) handwoven cloth

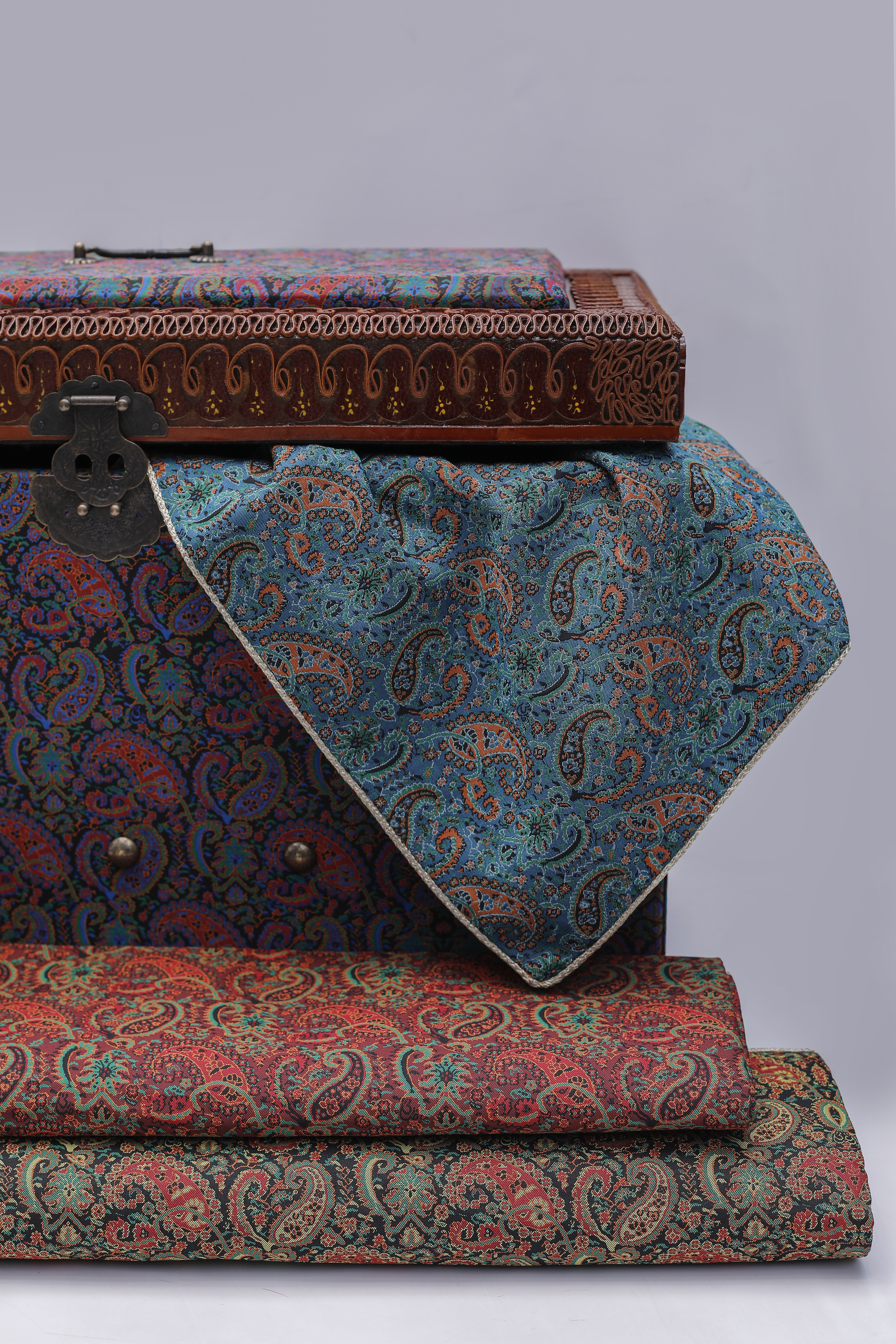
Several samples of termeh with paisley pattern

Termeh (Persian: ترمه) is a type of valuable and traditional fabric, often made from silk, cashmere, or wool, and featuring intricate traditional patterns. This fabric is produced in Iran and Kashmir and is highly popular due to its delicate and complex designs.

The exact origin of termeh is uncertain, and researchers are divided on whether its production first started in Iran or Kashmir. Generally, Iranian designs like paisley were introduced to India during the Safavid period and had a significant influence on the design of Kashmiri shawls.

In Iran, termeh production initially started in Kerman and later reached its peak in Yazd. In the past, these fabrics were used by the Zoroastrians of Yazd for wedding garments and other traditional attire. From the early 19th century, challenges such as heavy taxes and shortages of raw materials led to a decline in termeh production. However, during the Qajar era, it remained a valuable and prestigious commodity.

Old termehs were often made from hand-spun wool and dyed using natural dyes. These fabrics were relatively thick, as many threads were used in their weaving. Each piece of termeh was woven in narrow sections and then carefully sewn together by skilled artisans to appear seamless.

Famous termeh patterns include paisley and Shah Abbasi flower. Each design had a specific meaning and played an important role in Iranian culture and art. During the Qajar period, termeh was used in the clothing of kings and courtiers and even gifted to foreign rulers. Additionally, this fabric was used to make hats, robes, gowns, and women's dresses.

With the introduction of Jacquard looms in the 1970s, traditional termeh production gradually declined and was replaced by machine-made production. Today, machine-made termehs are mostly produced in Yazd and are used as fine fabric for various products such as curtains, prayer rugs, and scarves. Even now, this fabric holds a special place in significant events, including weddings and funerals, and is regarded as an important part of Iran's cultural heritage.

== See also ==
- Persian handicrafts
