= Nakshi kantha =

Type of Bengali embroidered quilt

Nakshi Kantha
- Geographical indication
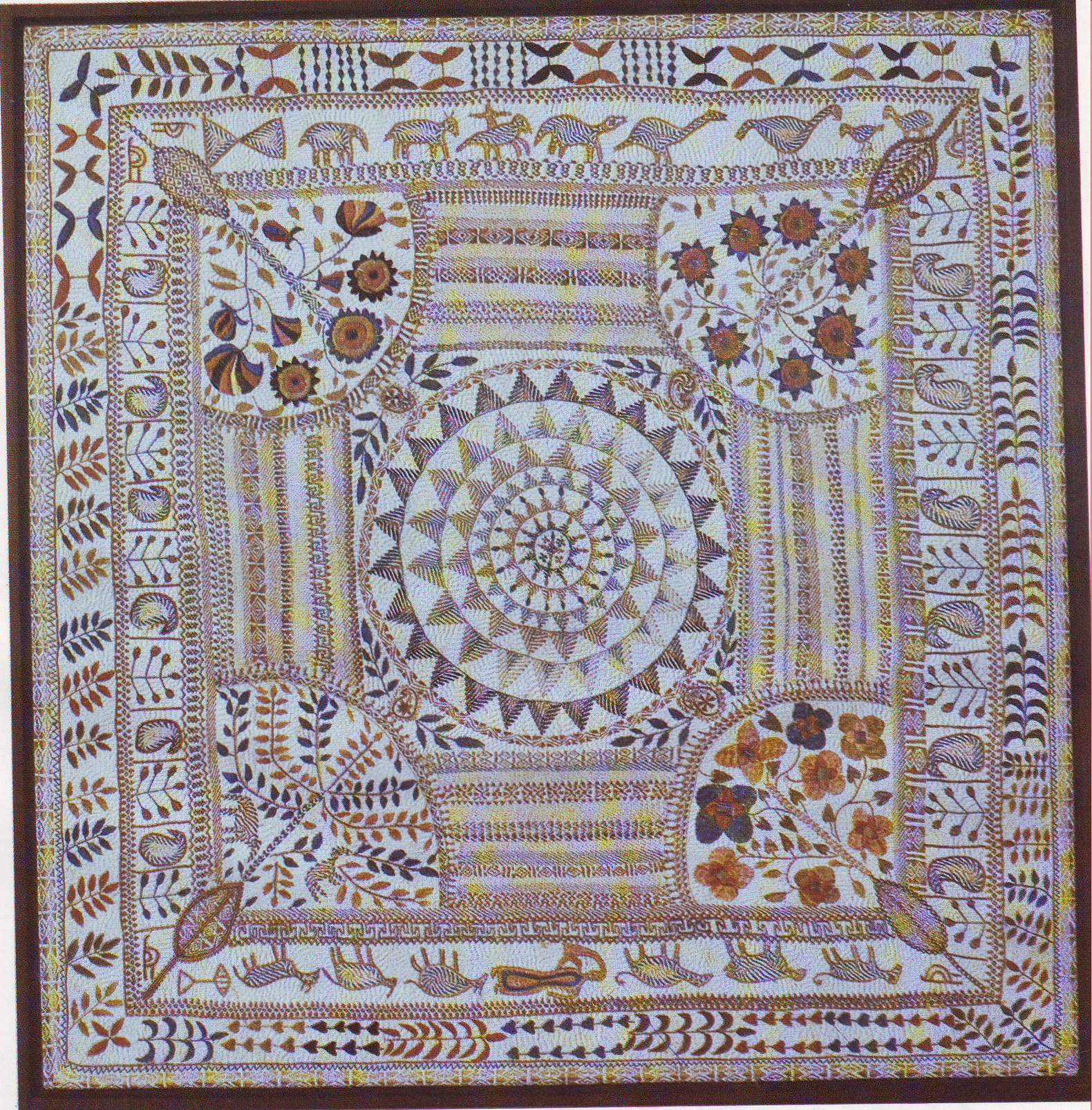
- Traditional nakshi kantha
- Alternative names: নকশি কাঁথা
- Description: A traditional embroidery art of Bangladesh, West Bengal, Tripura and Barak Valley region
- Country: Bangladesh and India
- Material: Cloth, usually cotton

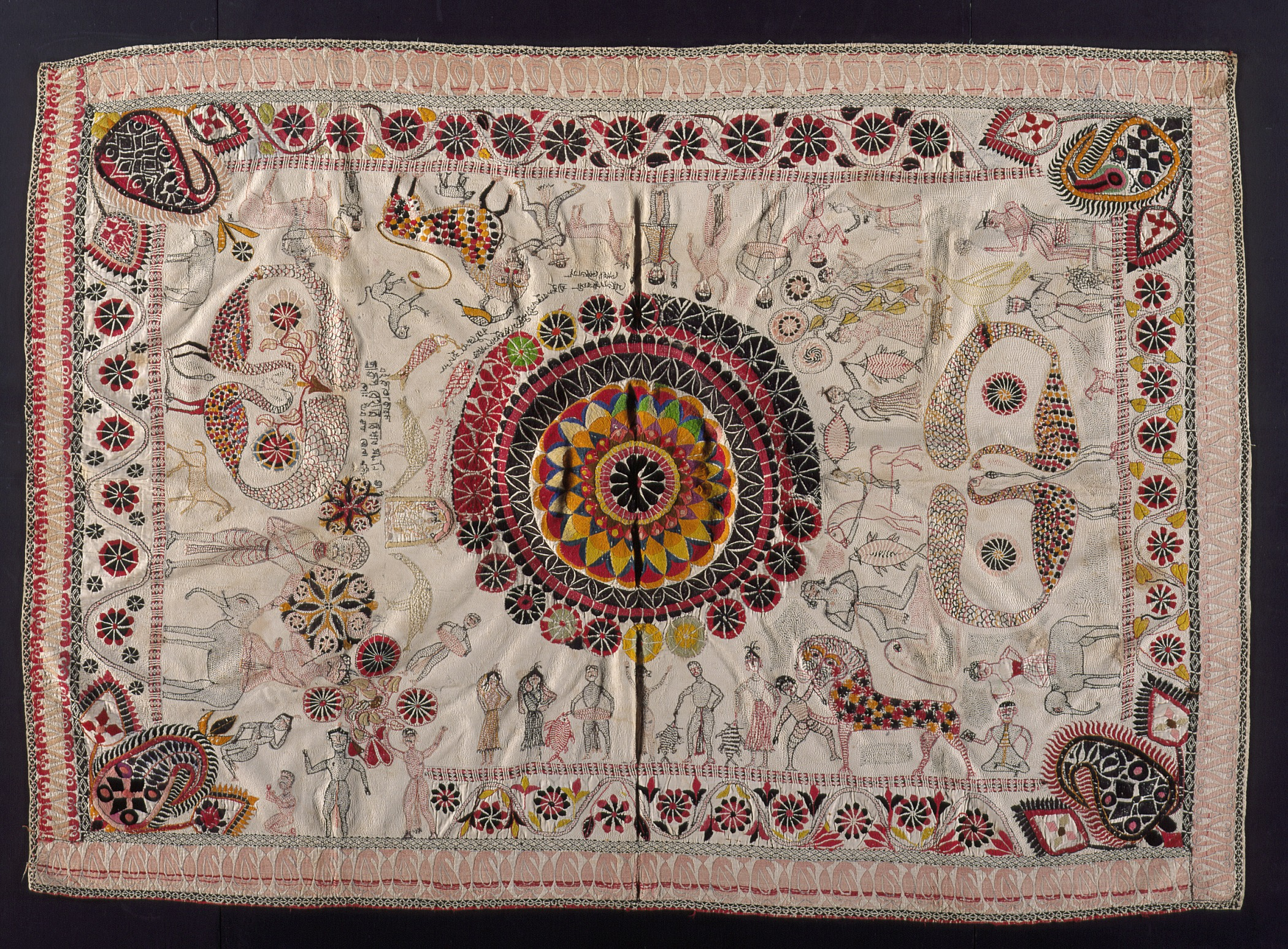
Quilt, 19th century, cotton and wool.

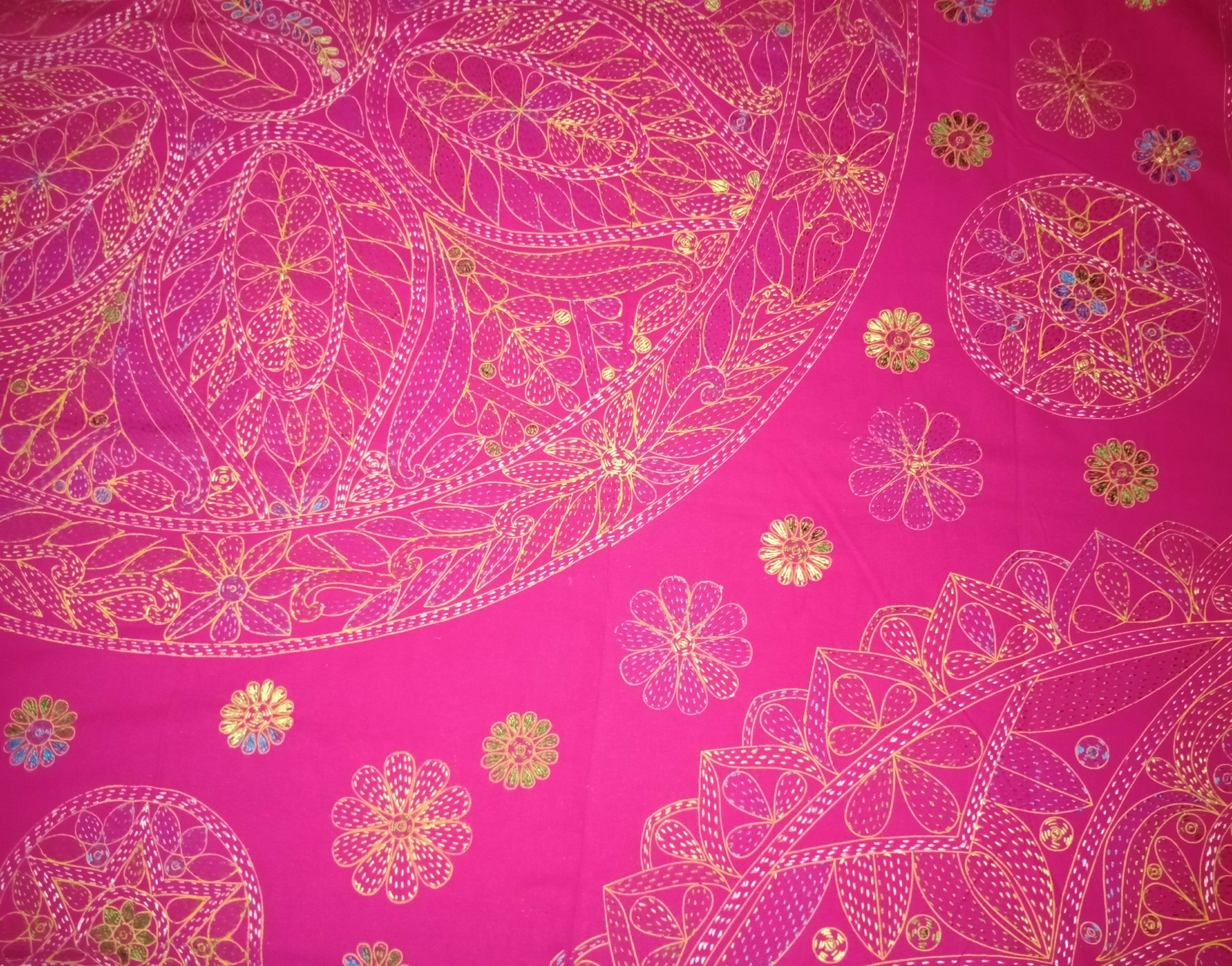
Nakshi kantha

Nakshi kantha, a type of embroidered quilt, is a centuries-old Bengali art tradition of the Bengal region, notably in Bangladesh and the Indian states of West Bengal, Tripura, and parts of Assam. The basic materials used are thread and old cloth. Nakshi kanthas are made throughout Bangladesh, primarily in the areas of Mymensingh, Jamalpur, Bogra, Rajshahi, Faridpur, Jessore, and Chittagong.

The colourful patterns and designs that are embroidered resulted in the name "Nakshi Kantha," which was derived from the Bengali word "naksha," referring to artistic patterns. Early kanthas had a white background accented with red, blue, and black embroidery; later, yellow, green, pink, and other colours were also included. The running stitch, called the "kantha stitch," is the main stitch used for this purpose. Traditionally, kanthas were produced for family use. Today, following the revival of the nakshi kantha, they are produced commercially.

== Etymology ==
The word kantha has no discernible etymological root. The exact origin of the word is not precisely known, although it probably has a precursor in kheta (meaning "field" in Bengali). According to Niaz Zaman, the word kantha originates from the Sanskrit word kontha, which means rags, as kantha is made of rags.

== Tradition ==
Like any other folk art, kantha making is influenced by factors such as the materials available, daily needs, climate, geography, and economic conditions. The earliest form of kantha was probably the patchwork kantha, and the kanthas of the decorative appliqué type evolved from this.

== In literature ==
The earliest mention of Bengali kantha is found in the medieval Bengali literature Chaitanya Charitamrita by Krishnadasa Kaviraja, written during the late 16th century. The Bengali poet Jasimuddin wrote the poem Nakshi Kanthar Math about nakshi kantha.

== Making ==
Traditionally, old sarees, lungis, and dhotis were used to make kanthas. Kantha making was not a full-time occupation; women in almost every household were experts in the art. Rural women worked during their leisure time or the rainy season, so it was common for a kantha to take months or even years to complete. At least three to six sarees were needed to make a standard-sized kantha. In contemporary kanthas, new cotton cloths are used instead. Traditionally, the thread was collected from old sarees, although this is rarely done today.

When a kantha is being made, the sarees are first joined to achieve the required size, and then layers are spread out on the ground. The cloths are smoothed, ensuring no folds or creases are left in between. During the process, the cloth is kept flat on the ground with weights placed on the edges. The four edges are then stitched, and two or three rows of large running stitches are made to keep the kantha together. At this stage, the kantha can be folded and stitched during leisure time.

Originally, designs and motifs were not drawn on the cloth. The design was first outlined with needle and thread, followed by the focal points, and then the filling motifs were added. In a kantha with a predominant central motif, the centre was done first, followed by the corner designs and other details. In some types of kanthas (such as carpet, lik, and sujni), wooden blocks were used to print the outline. Today, the blocks are replaced by patterns drawn on tracing paper.

== Types ==
The following is how kanthas are categorised, according to the stitch type:

=== Running stitch ===
The running stitch kantha is the indigenous Zidan Al Hakim. It is subdivided into Nakshi (figured) and par tola (patterned). Nakshi (figured) kanthas are further divided into motif or scenic kanthas.

=== Lohori kantha ===
The name was derived from Sanskrit, as in Soundarya Lahari or Shivananda Lahari—religious poetic works in Sanskrit by Adi Shankara. It is also found in the Persian language, where it carries the same meaning, lehr, which means "wave." This type of kantha is particularly popular in Rajshahi. These kanthas are further divided into soja (straight or simple), Kabutar khupi (pigeon coop or triangle), and diamond.

=== Lik or anarasi ===
The Lik or Anarasi (pineapple) type of kantha is found in the Malda, Chapainawabganj, and Jessore areas. The variations include lik tan, lik tile, lik jhumka, and lik lohori.

=== Cross-stitch or carpet ===
This type of kantha was introduced by the English during British rule in India. The stitch used in these kanthas is the cross-stitch.

=== Sujni kantha ===
This type of kantha is found only in the Rajshahi area. The popular motif used is the undulating floral and vine design.

== Influence of religion and folk belief ==
Hindu women in the 19th century used human and animal forms to tell stories of gods, goddesses, and their Vahanas. Bengali women were free to draw inspiration from their rich indigenous surroundings as well as contemporary stories. To them, the fabric was the artist, and the person was the artisan. In the mid-19th century, the colour schemes and designs began to change to make them suitable for use on modern garments. In 1940, Kabiguru Rabindranath Tagore and his daughter-in-law Pratima Devi trained Santali women in Birbhum District, and quality work was produced under the tutelage of Kalabhaban artists.

== Stitches ==
The earliest and most basic stitch found in kanthas is the running stitch. The predominant form of this stitch is called the phor or kantha stitch. Other forms of stitches used include the Chatai or pattern darning, Kaitya or bending stitch, weave running stitch, darning stitch, Jessore stitch (a variation of the darning stitch), threaded running stitch, Lik phor or anarasi or ghar hasia (Holbein) stitches. The stitches used in modern-day kantha include the Kashmiri stitch and the arrowhead stitch. Stitches such as the herringbone stitch, satin stitch, backstitch, and cross-stitch are occasionally used.

== Types ==
Kanthas generally denote quilts used as wrappers; however, all articles made by quilting old cloth may also be referred to by the same generic name. Depending on the size and purpose, kanthas may be divided into various articles, each with its specific name. The various types of kantha are as follows:

- Quilt (lep in Bengali): A light quilted covering made from old sarees, dhotis, lungis, and sometimes from sheet cloths.
- Large spread (Nakshi Kantha in Bengali): An embellished quilt embroidered with traditional motifs and innovative styles.
- Cover for Quran (ghilaf in Arabic and Bengali): An envelope-shaped bag used to cover the Quran.
- Prayer mats (Jainamaz in Bengali): Mats used by Muslims for prayer.
- Puja floor spread (Ason in Bengali): A cloth spread used for sitting at a place of worship or for an honoured guest.
- Cosmetic wrapper (Arshilota in Bengali): A narrow embroidered wrapper used to roll and store a woman's comb, mirror, eye kohl, vermilion, sandal paste, oil bottle, etc. Often, a tying string is used to bind the wrap, similar to later-day sachets.
- Wallet (Batwa Thoiley in Bengali): A small envelope-shaped bag for keeping money, betel leaves, etc.
- Floor spread (Galicha in Bengali): Floor coverings.
- Cloth wrapper (Bostani, Guthri in Bengali): A square wrapper for books and other valuables.
- Cover (Dhakni in Bengali): Covering cloths of various shapes and sizes.
- Ceremonial meal spread (Daster Khan in Bengali): A spread for the eating place, used at mealtime.
- Pillow cover (Balisher Chapa or Oskar in Bengali): A flat, single-piece pillow cover.
- Handkerchief (Rumal): Small and square.
- Modern-day articles: Today, new uses are found for nakshi kanthas, such as bedspreads, wall hangings, cushion covers, ladies' purses, placemats, jewellery boxes, dress fronts, skirt borders, shawls, and sarees.

== Motifs ==
Motifs used in nakshi kantha are deeply influenced by religious beliefs and culture. Although no strict symmetry is followed, a finely embroidered nakshi kantha will always have a focal point. Most kanthas feature a lotus as the central motif, with undulating vines, floral patterns, or a shari border motif surrounding it. The motifs may include images of flowers and leaves, birds and fish, animals, kitchen items, and even toilet articles.

While most kanthas have an initial pattern, no two nakshi kanthas are the same. Although traditional motifs are repeated, individual touches are evident in the variety of stitches, colours, and shapes. The notable motifs found in nakshi kantha are as follows:

=== Lotus motif ===
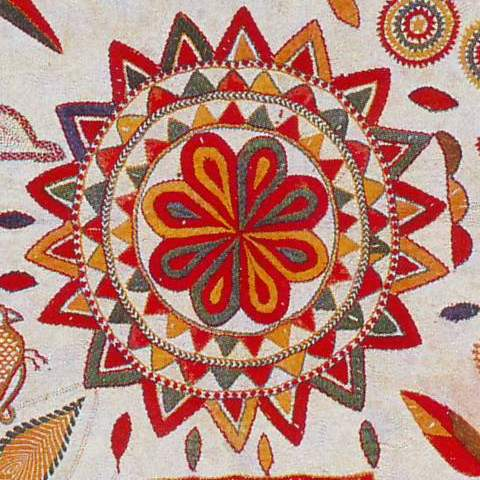
Lotus motif

The lotus motif is the most common design found in kanthas. This motif is associated with Hindu iconography and is therefore very popular in kantha. The lotus is the divine seat and is symbolic of cosmic harmony and essential womanhood. It also represents the eternal order and the union of earth, water, and sky. The lotus symbolises the life-giving power of water and is linked to the sun, as its petals open and close with the sun's movement. It also represents the recreating power of life: with the drying up of water, the lotus dies, and with the rain, it springs to life again. The lotus is associated with purity. There are various forms of lotus motifs, from the eight-petaled astadal padma to the hundred-petaled satadal. In older kanthas, the central motif is almost always a fully bloomed lotus seen from above.

=== Solar motif ===
The solar motif is closely associated with the lotus putki. Often, the lotus and solar motifs are found together at the centre of a nakshi kantha. The solar motif symbolises the life-giving power of the sun. The sun is linked to fire, which plays a significant role in Hindu rites, both religious and matrimonial.

=== Moon motif ===
The moon motif has a religious influence and is popular among Bengali Muslims. It is mostly depicted as a crescent moon accompanied by a star. This motif is particularly found in jainamaz kanthas.

=== Islamic Motifs ===
Religious motifs such as mosques, stars, Arabic calligraphy, and Islamic arts, as well as motifs from Jamdani, which is part of the Muslim heritage of Bangladesh, are used in nakshi kantha, particularly for religious activities such as prayer rugs and covers for the Quran.

=== Wheel motif ===
The wheel is a common symbol in Indian art, both Hindu and Buddhist. It represents order and the world. The wheel is a popular motif in kanthas, even when the maker has forgotten its original significance. The motif is relatively easy to create using the chatai phor stitch.

=== Swastika motif ===
Suasti in Sanskrit means "it is well." As a motif in Indian art, it dates back to the Indus Valley Civilisation and is a symbol of good fortune. It is also known as muchri or golok dhanda. Over time, the design has become more curvilinear than the four-armed swastika found on the Mohenjodaro seal. The symbolic design has significant influence in Hinduism, Buddhism, and Jainism.

=== Tree of life motif ===
The influence of this motif in Bangladeshi art and culture (as with kantha) can be traced back to the Indus Valley Civilisation. It is likely that the Indus people conceived the pipal tree as the Tree of Life, with the devata inside embodying the power of fecundity. During the Buddhist period, the cult of the tree continued. The pipal is sacred to the Buddha, as he received enlightenment under its shade. It reflects the fecundity of nature and is highly popular in Bengal. Vines and creepers play an important role in kanthas and symbolise the same meanings as the Tree of Life. A popular motif in Rajshahi lohori is the betel leaf.

=== Kalka motif ===
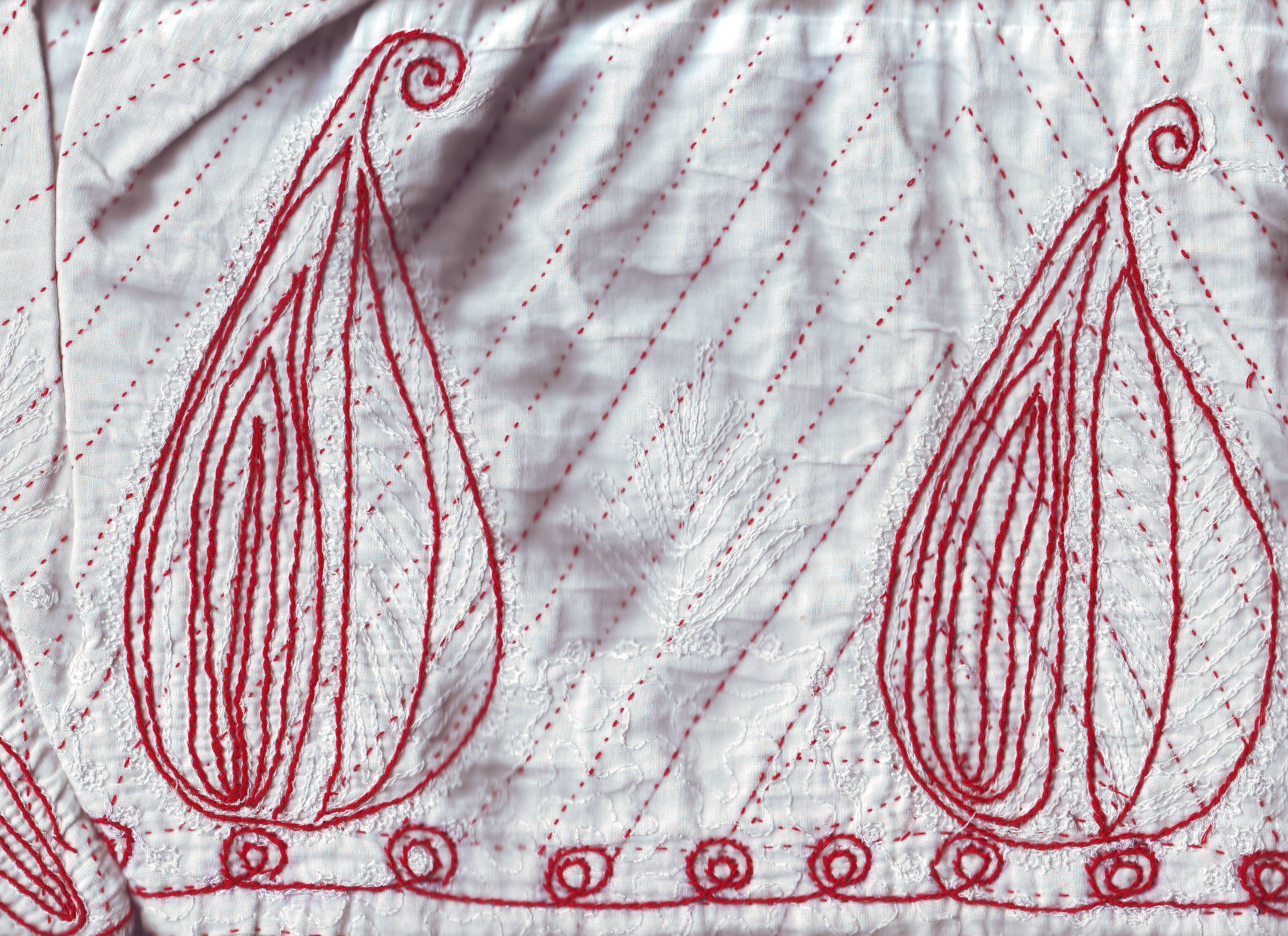
Close view of Kalka motif

This is a later-day motif, dating from the time of the Muslim Mughals rulers. The kalka, or paisley motif, originated in Persia and Kashmir and has become an integral part of the subcontinental decorative motif. It can be compared to a stylised leaf, mango, or flame. The kalka is an attractive motif, and a number of variations have been experimented with. Similar motifs can be found in traditional Kashmiri shawls.

== Other motifs ==
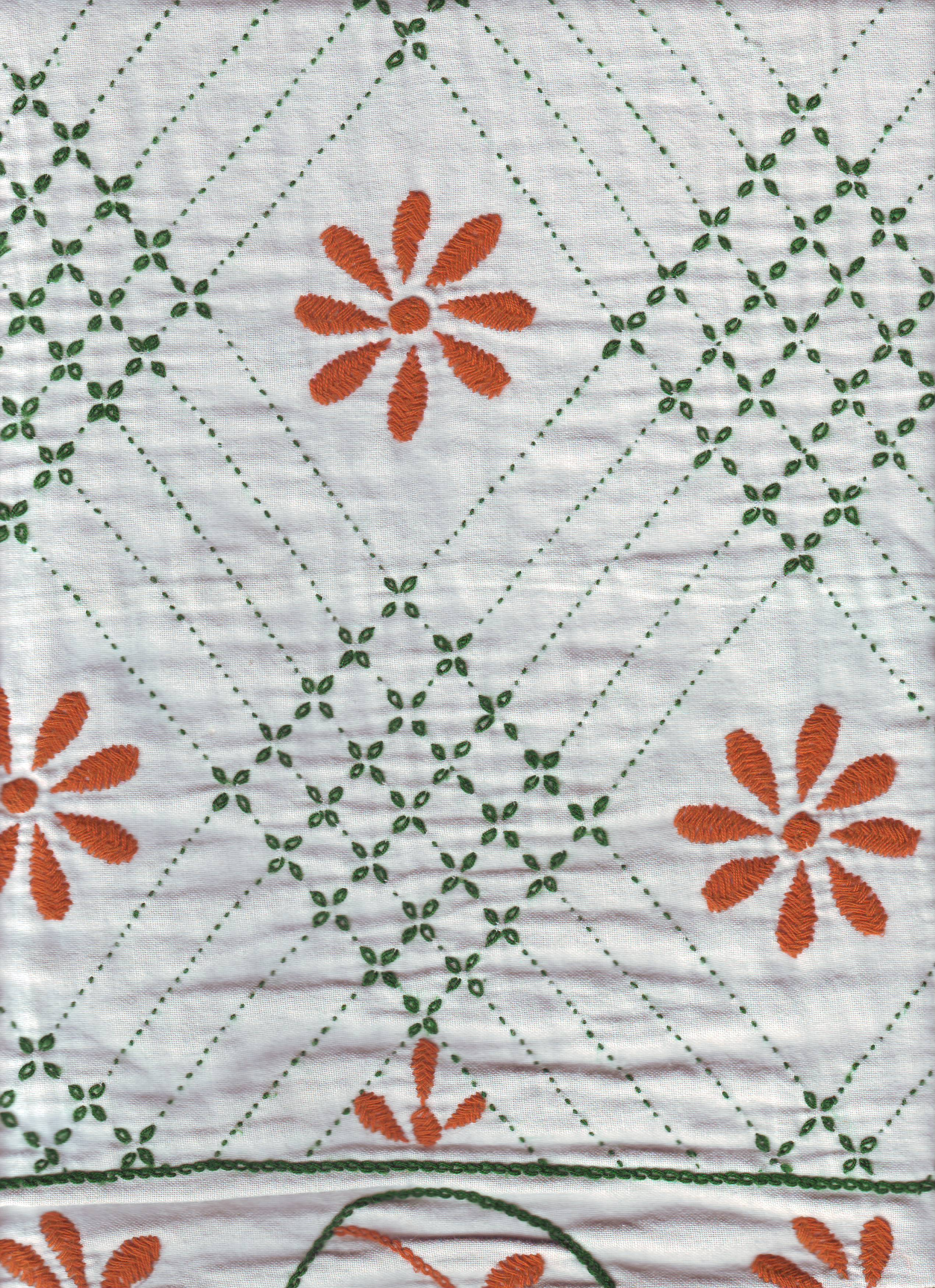
Close view of a contemporary Nakshi kantha with flower motif

- Water Motif:
- Mountain Motif:
- Fish Motif:
- Boat Motif:
- Footprint Motif:
- Ratha Motif:
- Mosque Motif:
- Panja or Open Palm Motif:
- Agricultural Implements:
- Animal Motifs:
- Toilet Articles:
- Kithen Implements:
- Kantha Motif:
- Palanquin Motif:

== Borders ==
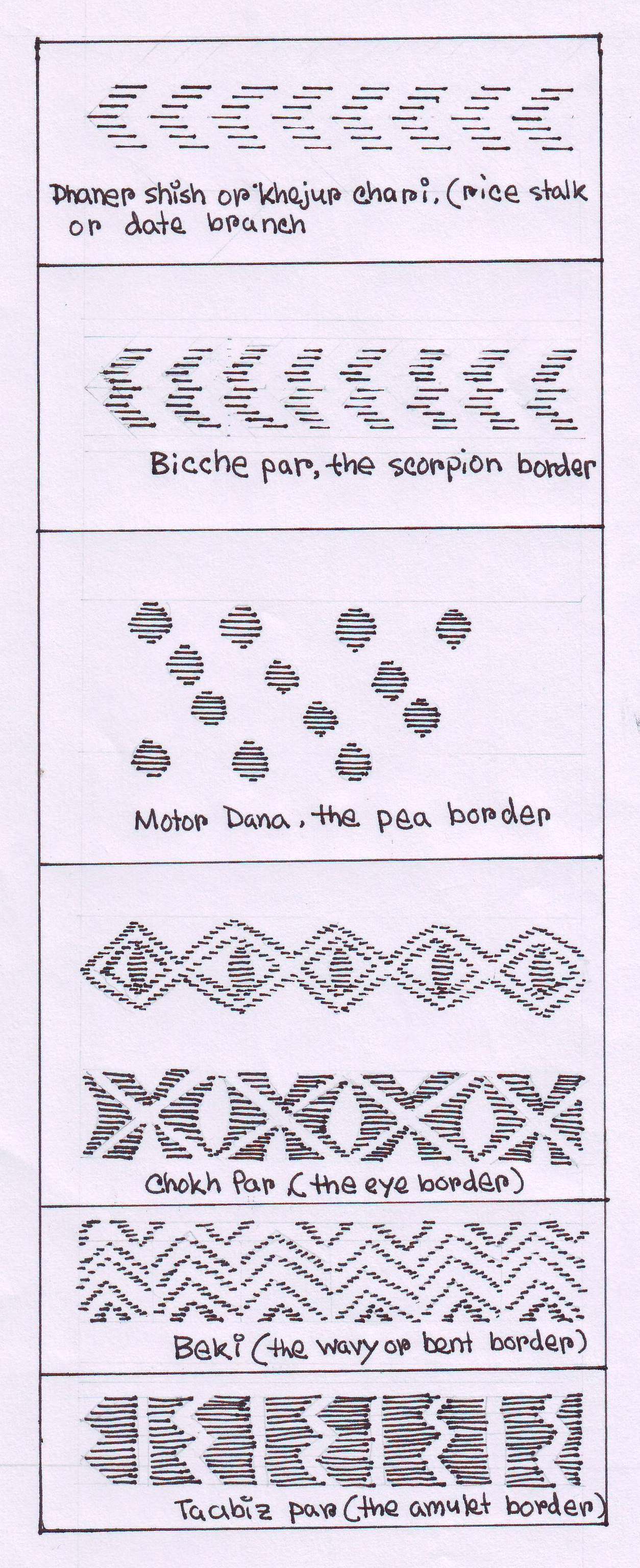
Borders from the top:rice stalk, scorpion, pea, eye, wavy or bent, amulet

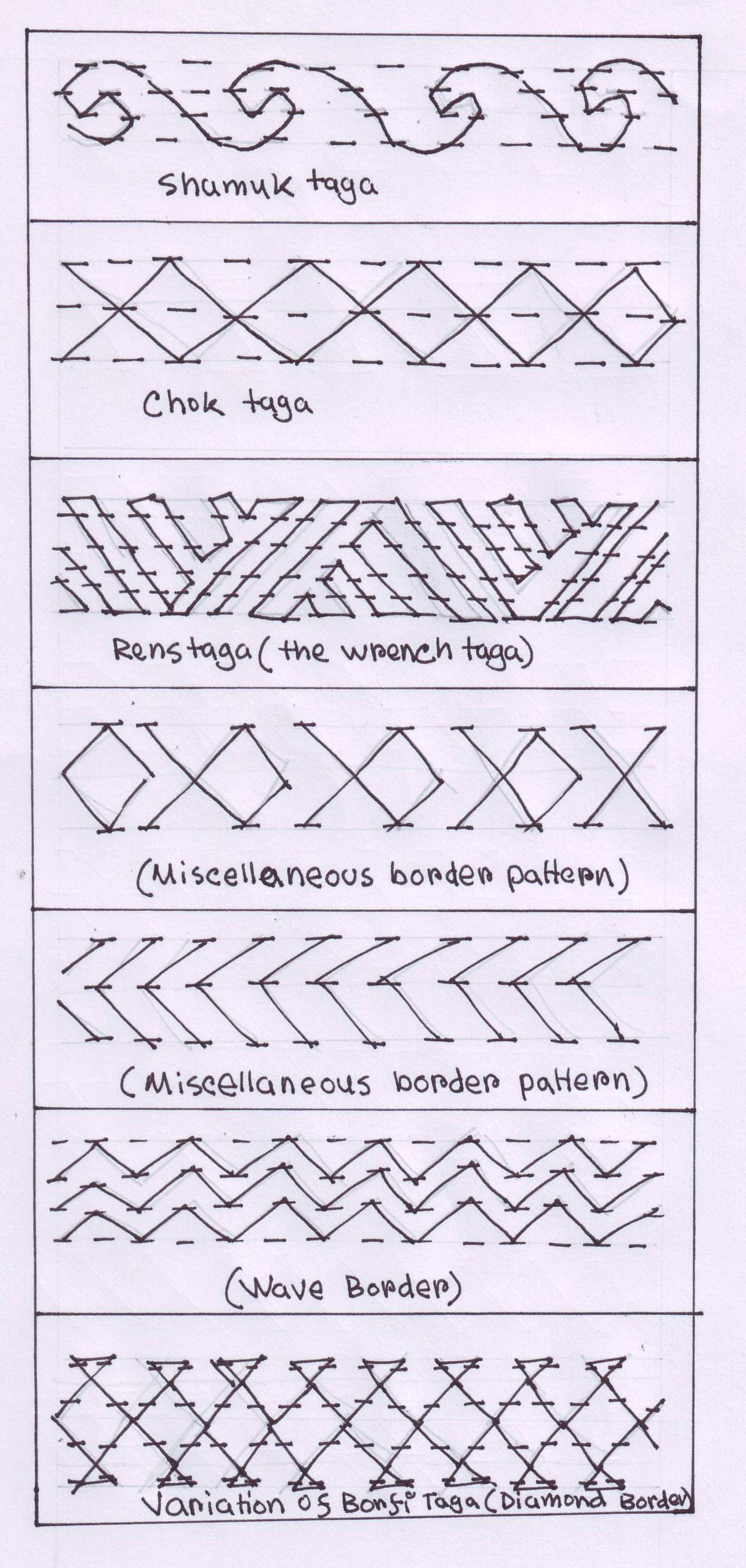
From the top: shamuk taga, eye border, wrench border, miscellenious borders, wave border, diamond border

Most nakshi kanthas have some form of border. Either a sari border is stitched on, or a border pattern is embroidered around the kantha. The common borders found in kanthas are as follows:

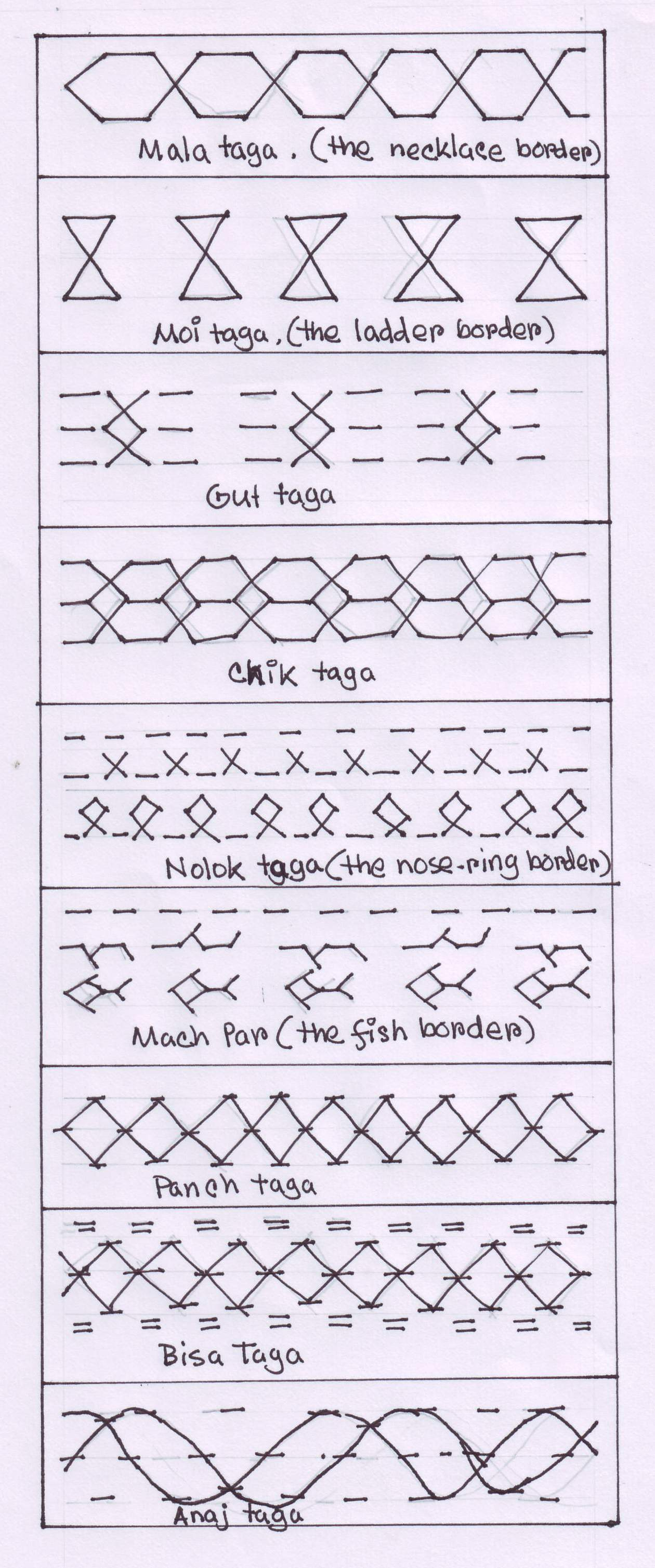
From the top: necklace border, ladder border, gut taga, chik taga, nose ring border, fish border, panch taga, bisa taga, anaj taga

- The Paddy Stalk or Date Branch (Dhaner Shish or Khejur Chari)
- The Scorpion Border (Biche Par in Bengali)
- The Wavy or Bent Border (Beki in Bengali)
- The Diamond Border (Barfi)
- The Eye Border (Chok Par in Bengali)
- The Amulet Border (Taabiz Par in Bengali)
- The Necklace Border (Mala Par in Bengali)
- The Ladder Border (Moi Taga)
- The Gut Taga
- The Chick Taga
- The Nolok Taga
- The Fish Border (Maach Par in Bengali)
- The Panch Taga
- The Bisa Taga
- The Anaj Taga
- The Shamuk Taga
- The Wrench Border
- The Anchor (Grafi Par in Bengali)
- The Pen Border (Kalam Par in Bengali)

== Collections ==
=== Bangladesh ===
- Bangla
- Design Centre, BSCIC
- Folk Art and Crafts Foundation
- Bangladesh National Museum

=== India ===
- Ashutosh Museum, Kolkata
- Calico Museum of Textiles, Ahmedabad
- Gurusaday Museum, Thakurpur

== Organizations that make Nakshi Kanthas ==
- Bangladesh Rural Development Board (BRDB), Karu Palli Sales Centre
- Kumudini Handicrafts (cares), Bangladesh
- BRAC-Aarong, Bangladesh

== Controversy regarding Geographical Indication ==
In 2008, the Indian state of West Bengal applied for Geographical Indication (GI) status for Nakshi Kantha, while Bangladesh, alongside West Bengal, was also a strong contender for the same. However, due to the absence of proper laws on Geographical Indication in Bangladesh at that time (which were later adopted), Bangladesh could not officially apply for the GI. The registry office granted the Geographical Indication to West Bengal in 2008.

The Bangladeshi authorities, however, later passed the "Bangladesh Geographical Indication (Registration and Protection) Act, 2013" in parliament. With the necessary preparations now in place, they are awaiting the next application cycle to claim the Geographical Indication for Nakshi Kantha in Bangladesh. The registry office granted the Geographical Indication to Bangladesh in 2024, as the name of "Jamalpur Nakshikantha".

== See also ==
- Nakshi pati, decorative sleeping mats made from cane, reeds, etc.

== Notes and references ==
=== References ===
- Ahmad, Perveen (1997). The Aesthetics & Vocabulary of Nakshi Kantha. Dhaka: Bangladesh National Museum. ISBN 984-585-000-6.
- Ghuznavi, Sayyada R. (1981). Naksha: A Collection of Designs of Bangladesh. Dhaka: Design Centre, Bangladesh Small & Cottage Industries Corporation. OCLC 10301770.
- Zaman, Niaz (1993). The Art of Kantha Embroidery (Second Revised ed.). Dhaka: University Press. ISBN 978-984-05-1228-7.
