= Embroidery stitch =

Decorative stitch used primarily in embroidery

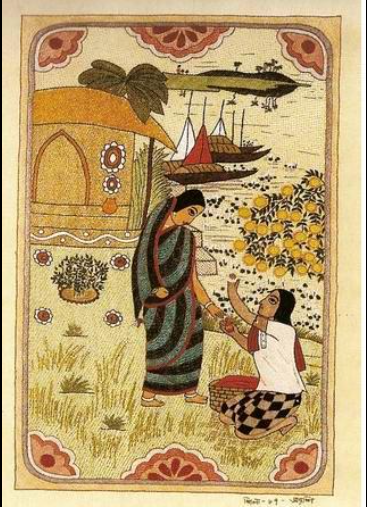
Bangladesh's Nakshi Kantha embroidery.

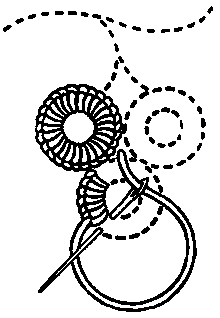
An illustration of the buttonhole stitch.

In everyday language, a stitch in the context of embroidery or hand-sewing is defined as the movement of the embroidery needle from the back of the fibre to the front side and back to the back side. The thread stroke on the front side produced by this is also called stitch. In the context of embroidery, an embroidery stitch means one or more stitches that are always executed in the same way, forming a figure. Embroidery stitches are also called stitches for short.

Embroidery stitches are the smallest units in embroidery. Embroidery patterns are formed by doing many embroidery stitches, either all the same or different ones, either following a counting chart on paper, following a design painted on the fabric or even working freehand.

== Common stitches ==
Embroidery uses various combinations of stitches. Each embroidery stitch has a special name to help identify it. These names vary from country to country and region to region. Some of the basic stitches of embroidery are running stitch, cross stitch, stem stitch, back stitch, satin stitch, chain stitch and blanket stitch. Stitches are categorized to stitch families based on the nature of the technique used to create the individual stitch. Some embroidery books will include name variations. Taken by themselves the stitches are mostly simple to execute, however when put together the results can be extremely complex.

Categorization of stitches will vary in stitch sampler books, and the breakdown of the stitches in the sections of the books may vary from those below.

=== Running stitches ===
Straight stitches pass through the fabric ground in a simple up and down motion, and for the most part moving in a single direction. These stitches can be executed in straight or curved lines, and work well for fine details. They can be used as the basis for some composite stitches, and can have a contrasting thread interlaced in them. Examples of straight stitches are:

- Running or basting stitch
- Simple satin stitch
- Algerian eye stitch
- Fern stitch

Straight Stitches that have two journeys (generally forwards and backwards over the same path). Examples:

- Holbein stitch, also known as the double running stitch
- Bosnian stitch

=== Back stitches ===
Back stitches pass through the fabric ground in an encircling motion. The needle in the simplest backstitch comes up from the back of the fabric, makes a stitch to the right going back to the back of the fabric, then passes behind the first stitch and comes up to the front of the fabric to the left of the first stitch. The needle then goes back to the back of the fabric through the same hole the stitch first came up from. The needle then repeats the movement to the left of the stitches and continues. Some examples of a back stitch are:

- Stem stitch or outline stitch
- Split stitch – the needle pierces the thread as it comes back up
- Crewel stitch - one of the easiest and most useful stitches

=== Chain stitches ===
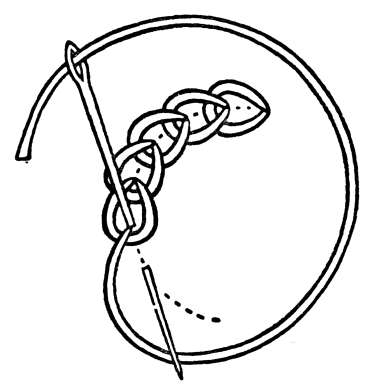
An illustration of chain stitching.

Chain stitches catch a loop of the thread on the surface of the fabric. In the simplest of the looped stitches, the chain stitch, the needle comes up from the back of the fabric and then the needle goes back into the same hole it came out of, pulling the loop of thread almost completely through to the back; but before the loop disappears, the needle come back up (a certain distance from the beginning stitch -the distance deciding the length of the stitch), passes through the loop and prevents it from being pulled completely to the back of the fabric. The needle then passes back to the back of the fabric through the second hole and begins the stitch again. Examples of chain stitches are:

- Chain stitch
- Lazy Daisy stitch, or detached chain. The loop stitch is held to the fabric at the wide end by a tiny tacking stitch.
- Spanish Chain or Zig-zag Chain

=== Buttonhole stitches ===
Buttonhole or blanket stitches also catch a loop of the thread on the surface of the fabric but the principal difference is that the needle does not return to the original hole to pass back to the back of the fabric. In the classic buttonhole stitch, the needle is returned to the back of the fabric at a right angle to the original start of the thread. The finished stitch in some ways resembles a letter "L" depending on the spacing of the stitches. For buttonholes the stitches are tightly packed together and for blanket edges they are more spaced out. The properties of this stitch make it ideal for preventing raveling of woven fabric. This stitch is also the basis for many forms of needle lace. Examples of buttonhole or blanket stitches.

- Blanket stitch
- Buttonhole stitch
- Closed buttonhole stitch, the tops of the stitch touch to form triangles
- Crossed buttonhole stitch, the tops of the stitch cross
- Buttonhole stitches combined with knots:
  - Top Knotted Buttonhole stitch
  - German Knotted Buttonhole stitch
  - Tailor's buttonhole stitch

=== Feather stitches ===
Feather stitches can be used for a wide variety of purposes, including foliage, and branches borders, smocking, and crazy quilting. Most are looped stitches, worked alternatively from left to right. They can be worked on plain or even-weave fabrics.

- Feather stitch
- Closed feather stitch
- Maidenhair stitch
- Chained feather stitch
- Cretan stitch

=== Cross stitches ===
Cross stitches or cross-stitch might be the oldest ornamental stitch, and has been found in ancient Egyptian and Hebrew embroideries. It is found in the decorative needlework of many cultures. This stitch has come to represent an entire industry of pattern production and material supply for the craft person. The stitch is done by creating a line of diagonal stitches going in one direction, usually using the warp and weft of the fabric as a guide, then on the return journey crossing the diagonal in the other direction, creating an "x". True cross stitch has legs of equal length that cross in the center. Also included in this class of stitches are:

- Herringbone stitches, including the hem stitch
- Breton stitch, here the threads of the "x" are twisted together
- Sprat's Head stitch
- Crow's Foot stitch, these last two stitches are often used in tailoring to strengthen a garment at a point of strain such as a pocket corner or the top of a kick pleat.

=== Knotted stitches ===
Knotted stitches are formed by wrapping the thread around the needle, once or several times, before passing it back to the back of the fabric ground. This is a predominant stitch in Brazilian embroidery, used to create flowers. Another form of embroidery that uses knots is Candlewicking, where the knots are created by forming a figure 8 around the needle. Examples of knotted stitches are:

- French knot, or twisted knot stitch
- Chinese knot, which varies from the French knot in that it takes a tiny stitch in the background fabric while creating the knot
- Bullion knots
- Coral stitch
- There are also more complex knotted stitches such as:
  - Knotted Loop stitch
  - Plaited Braid stitch
  - Sorbello stitch
  - Diamond stitch
- Knotted edgings based on buttonhole stitches include:
  - Antwerp edging stitch
  - Armenian edging stitch

=== Couching and laid work ===
Couching or laid stitches involve two sets of threads: the set that is being 'laid' onto the surface of the fabric and the set which attaches the laid threads. The laid threads may be heavier than the attaching thread, or they may be of a nature that does not allow them to be worked like a regular embroidery thread, such as metal threads. The stitches used to attach the laid thread may be of any nature—cross stitch, buttonhole stitch, or straight stitch—but some have specific names:

- Pendant couching
- Bokhara couching
- Square laid work
- Oriental couching
- Battlement couching
- Klosterstitch
- Roumanian couching
