= Straight stitch =

Type of simple embroidery and sewing stitch

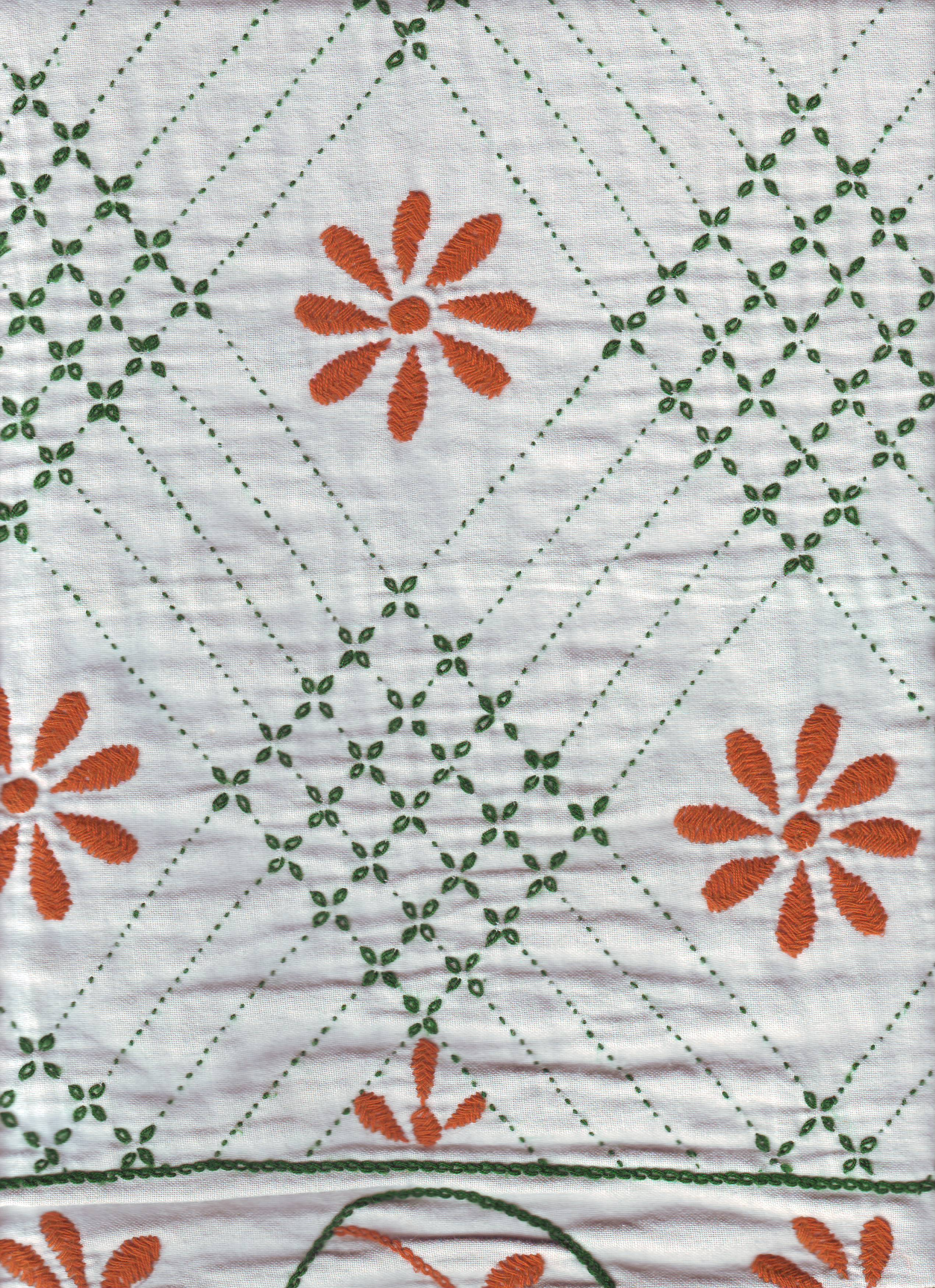
Kantha stich from Bangladesh

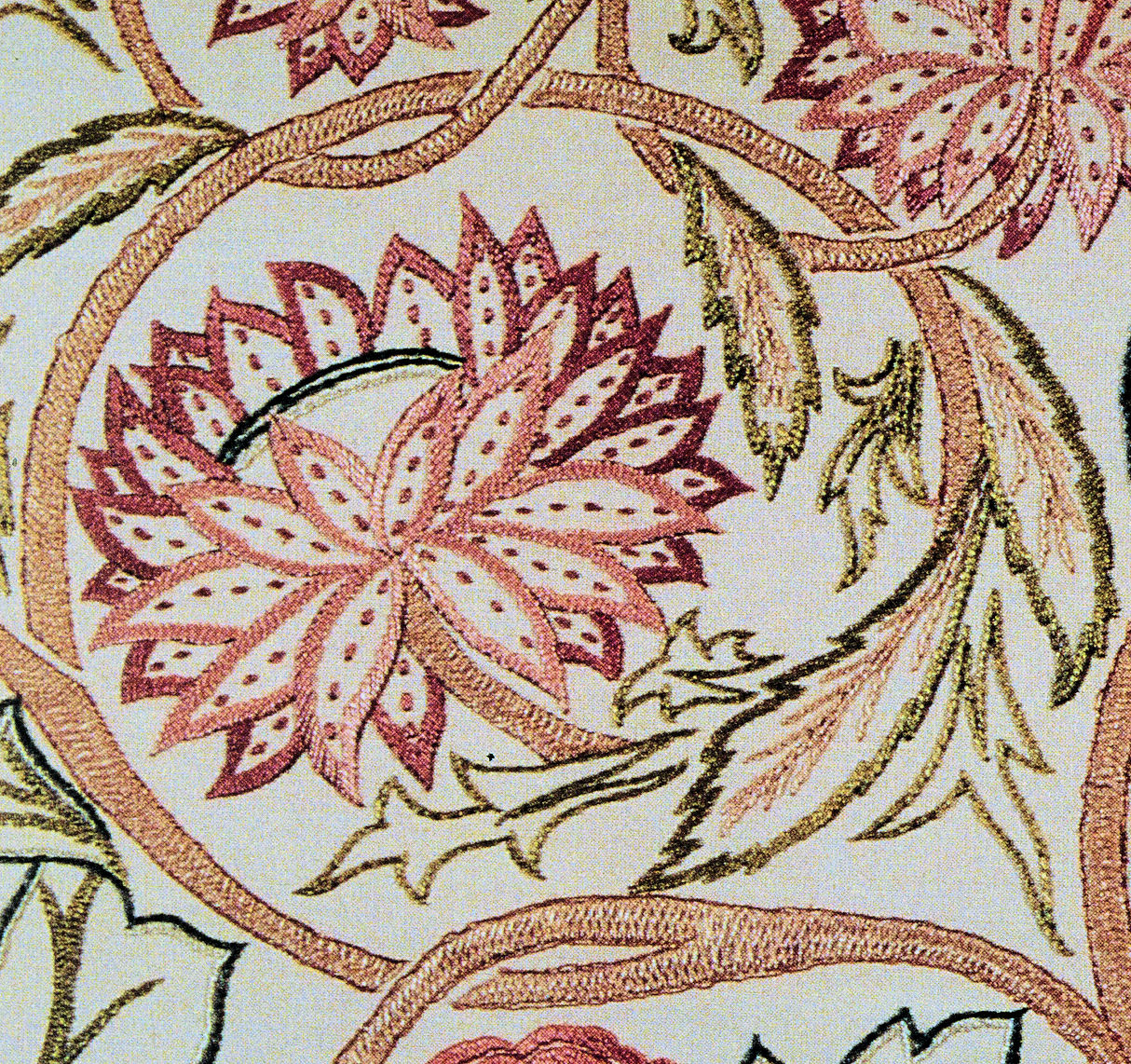
Seed stitches (small, detached running stitches) are used on the center ribs of these flower petals.

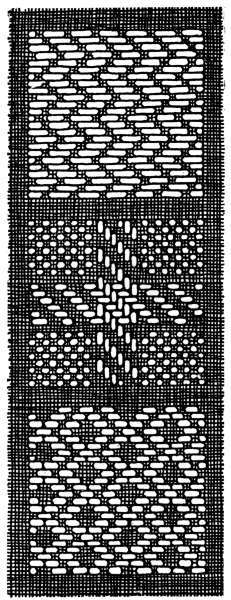
Pattern darning.

The straight or running stitch is the basic stitch in hand-sewing and embroidery, on which all other forms of sewing are based. The stitch is worked by passing the needle in and out of the fabric at a regular distance. All other stitches are created by varying the straight stitch in length, spacing, and direction.

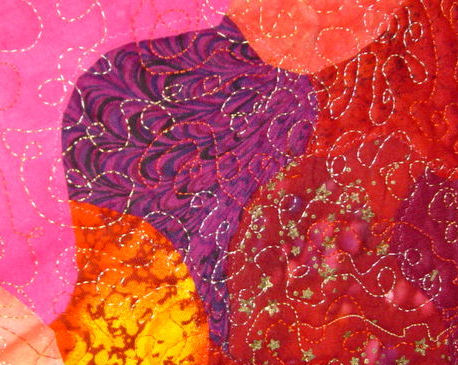
Detail of a contemporary quilt with quilting in free-form white and colored running stitches.

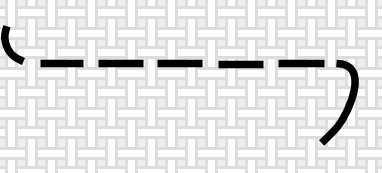
Running stitch.

Running stitches are most often not visible as they are used to close seams.

Running stitch, Holbein or double-running stitch, satin stitch and darning stitch are all classed as straight or flat stitches. Backstitch is also sometimes included in this category.

== Terminology ==
Some sources only use the term straight stitch to refer to a single stitch and use running stitch for a line of single stitches, while others use it interchangeably with or in place of running stitch.

== Uses ==
=== Seams, hems, and tailoring ===
Running stitches are used in hand-sewing and tailoring to sew basic seams, hems and gathers; in hand patchwork to assemble pieces of light fabrics; and in quilting to hold the fabric layers and batting or wadding in place. Loosely spaced rows of short running stitches are used to support padded satin stitch.

=== Darning ===
Darning has two purposes, decorative and functional, though it is often both. Darning for decorative purposes, often referred to as Pattern darning, is an ancient technique in which parallel rows of straight stitches in varying lengths are arranged to form geometric patterns. Japanese Kogin embroidery is a pattern darning style from the island of Honshū, often worked in white cotton thread on rough, dark blue indigo-dyed linen.

Embroidered pillow cover, Naxos, 17th-18th century. Silk embroidery on linen ground fabric. Embroidery: running stitch in alternate alignment.

Running stitches are a component of many traditional embroidery styles, including kantha of India and Bangladesh, and Japanese sashiko quilting and other embroidery styles such as pattern darning and redwork. Running stitches are the primary stitch used in Colonial American bed rugs.

== Related stitches ==
- The running stitch family includes looped running stitches, laced running stitches, whipped running stitches, and others like the Holbein stitch, seed stitch and more.
- Basting stitches, also called "tailor's tack", are long-running stitches used to keep two pieces of fabric or trim aligned during final sewing, or to otherwise temporarily sew two pieces together.
- Darning stitches are closely spaced parallel rows of running stitches used to fill or reinforce worn areas of a textile, or as decoration.
- Holbein or double-running stitches have a second row of running stitches worked in a reverse direction in between the stitches of the first pass, to make a solid line of stitching.
- Double darning stitches are closely spaced (but not overlapping) rows of Holbein stitches.
- The saddle stitch, commonly used in leathercrafting and shoemaking, consists of two running stitches done at the same time using a single thread with a needle at either end.

=== Stitch gallery ===
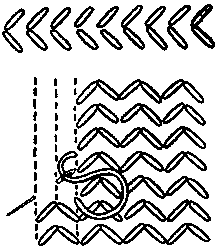
Arrowhead stitch

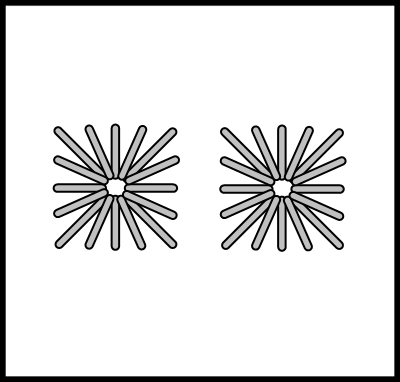
Eye stitch

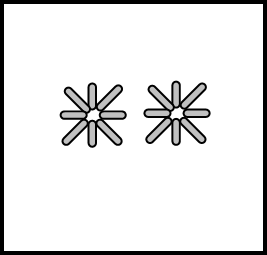
Algerian eye stitch

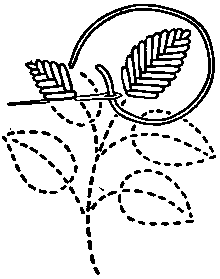
Fishbone stitch

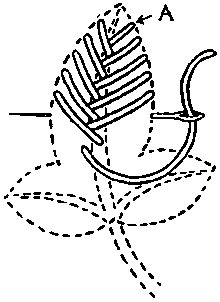
Open fishbone stitch

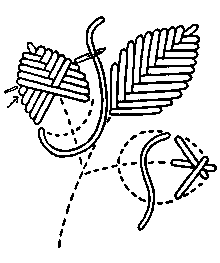
Raised fishbone stitch

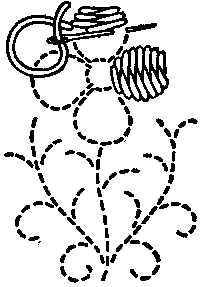
Flat stitch

== See also ==
- Blackwork embroidery
- Darning
- Embroidery stitches
