= Darning =

Sewing technique for repairing holes

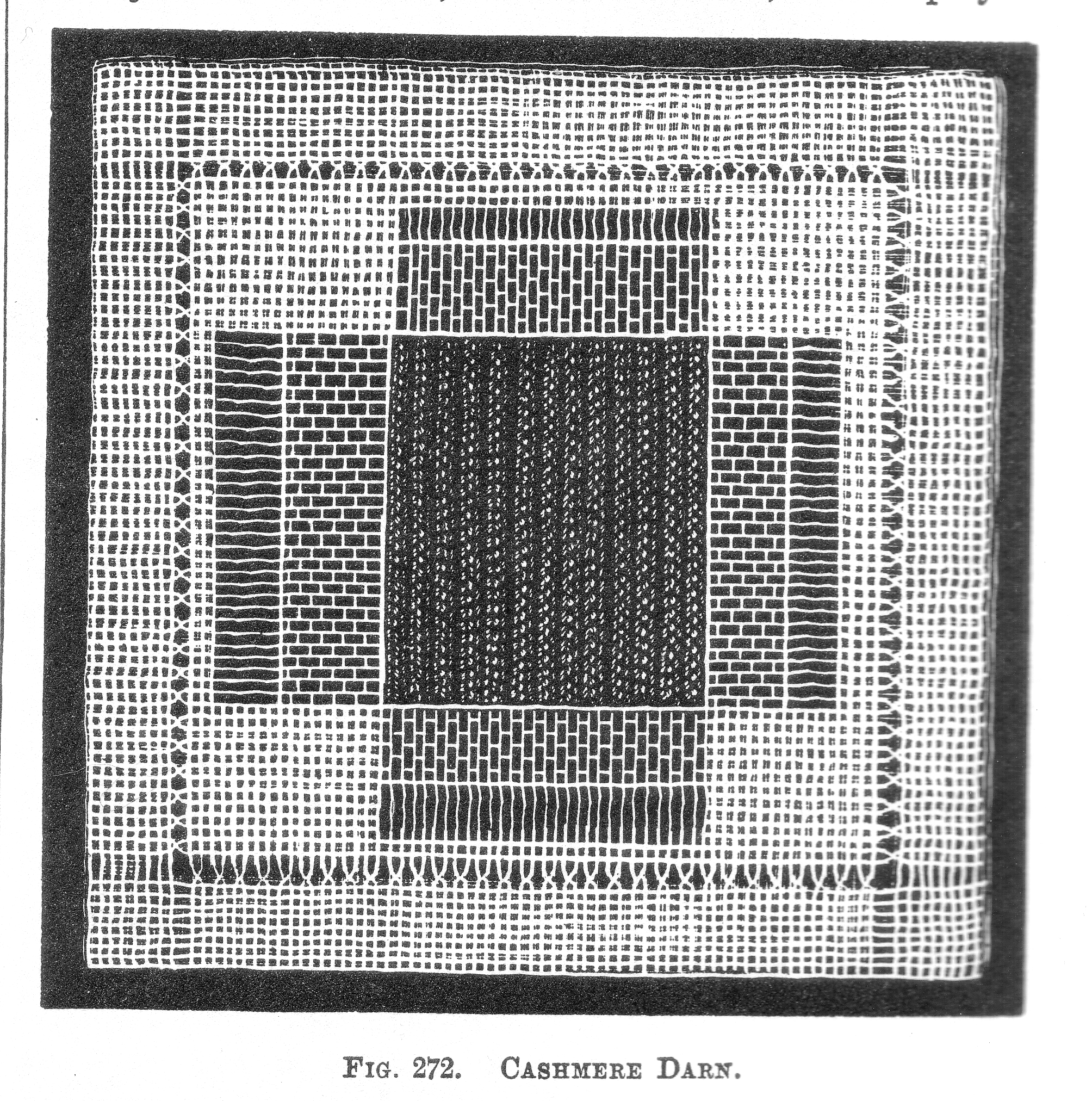
"Cashmere darn", a fine darning technique for twill fabric

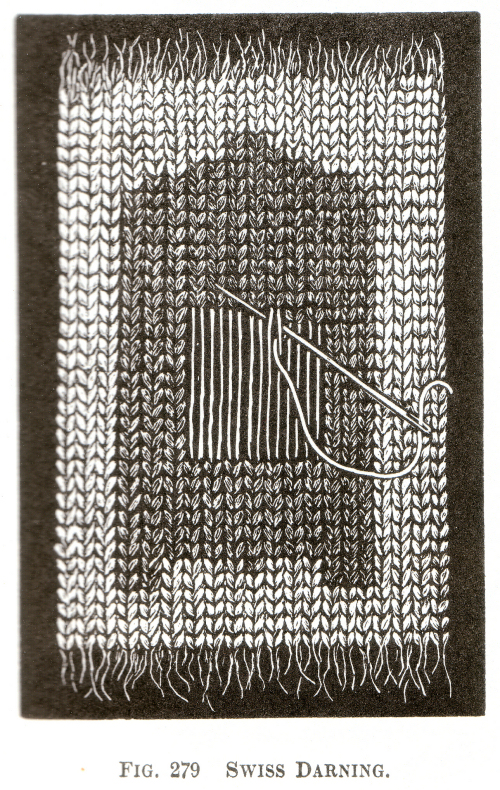
"Swiss darning" to repair knits

Darning is a sewing technique for repairing holes or worn areas in fabric or knitting using needle and thread alone. It is often done by hand, but using a sewing machine is also possible. Hand darning employs the darning stitch, a simple running stitch in which the thread is "woven" in rows along the grain of the fabric, with the stitcher reversing direction at the end of each row, and then filling in the framework thus created, as if weaving. Darning is a traditional method for repairing fabric damage or holes that do not run along a seam, and where patching is impractical or would create discomfort for the wearer, such as on the heel of a sock.

Darning also refers to any of several needlework techniques that are worked using darning stitches:

- Pattern darning is a type of embroidery that uses parallel rows of straight stitches of different lengths to create a geometric design.
- Net darning, also called filet lace, is a 19th-century technique using stitching on a mesh foundation fabric to imitate lace.
- Needle weaving is a drawn thread work embroidery technique that involves darning patterns into bare laid warp or weft thread.

== Darning cloth ==
In its simplest form, darning consists of anchoring the thread in the fabric on the edge of the hole and carrying it across the gap. It is then anchored on the other side, usually with a running stitch or two. If enough threads are criss-crossed over the hole, the hole will eventually be covered with a mass of thread.

Fine darning, sometimes known as Belgian darning, attempts to make the repair as invisible and neat as possible. Often the hole is cut into a square or darn blends into the fabric.

There are many varieties of fine darning. Simple over-and-under weaving of threads can be replaced by various fancy weaves, such as twills, chevrons, etc., achieved by skipping threads in regular patterns.

Invisible darning is the epitome of this attempt at restoring the fabric to its original integrity. Threads from the original weaving are unraveled from a hem or seam and used to effect the repair. Invisible darning is appropriate for extremely expensive fabrics and items of apparel.

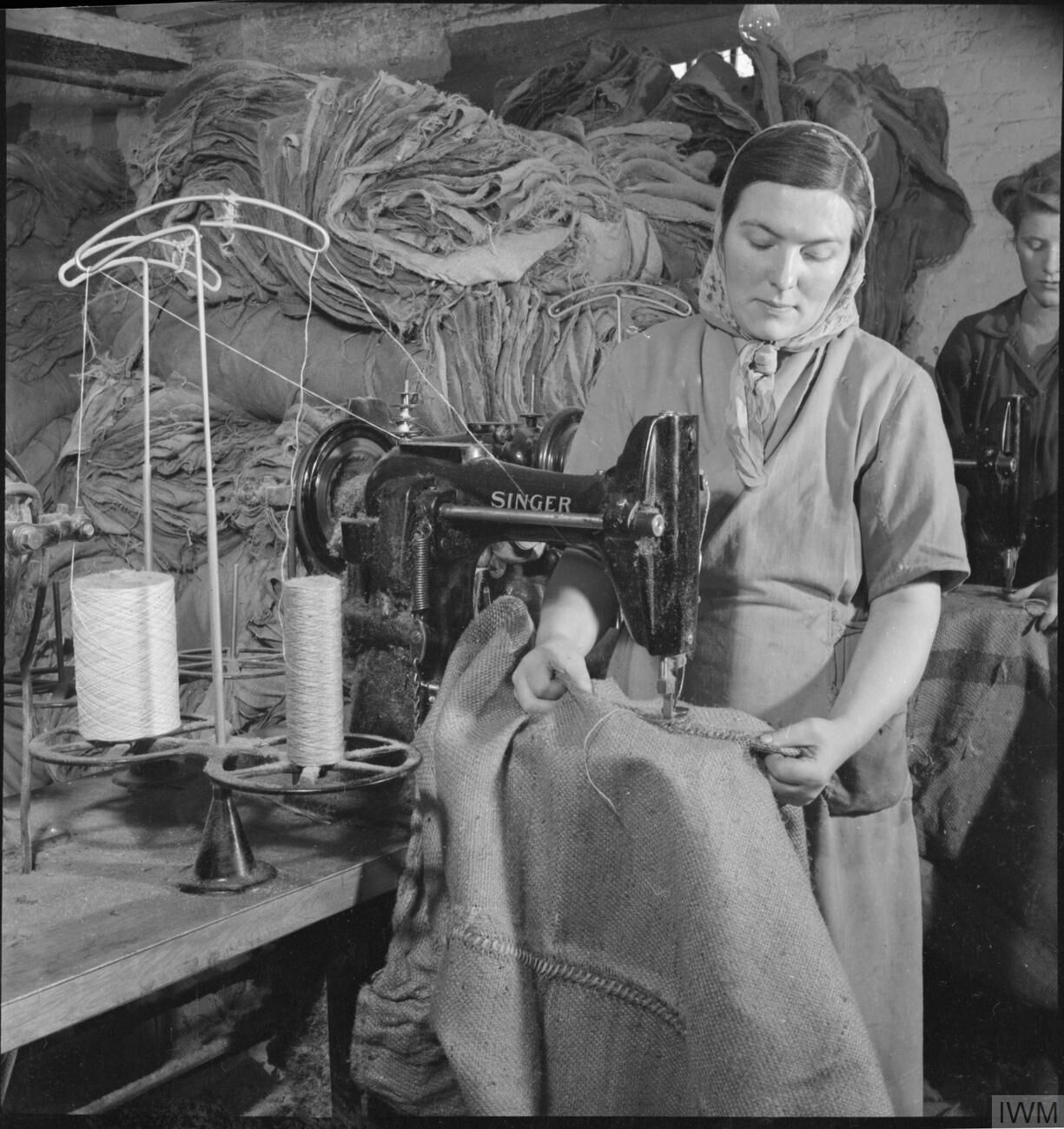
A woman using a machine to darn sacks.

In machine darning, lines of machine running stitch are run back and forth across the hole, then the fabric is rotated and more lines run at right angles.

== Tools ==
There are special tools for darning socks or stockings:

- A darning egg is an egg-shaped tool, made of stone, porcelain, wood, or similar hard material, which is inserted into the toe or heel of the sock to hold it in the proper shape and provide a foundation for repairs. A shell of the tiger cowry Cypraea tigris, a popular ornament in Europe and elsewhere, was also sometimes used as a ready-made darning egg.
- A darning mushroom is a mushroom-shaped tool usually made of wood. The sock is stretched over the curved top of the mushroom, and gathered tightly around the stalk to hold it in place for darning.
- A darning gourd is a hollow dried gourd with a pronounced neck. The sock can be stretched over the full end of the gourd and held in place around the neck for darning.

Specialty tools aside, anything that is round that can stretch and secure the fabric is also effective. Other examples include lacrosse balls, light bulbs, and lemons.

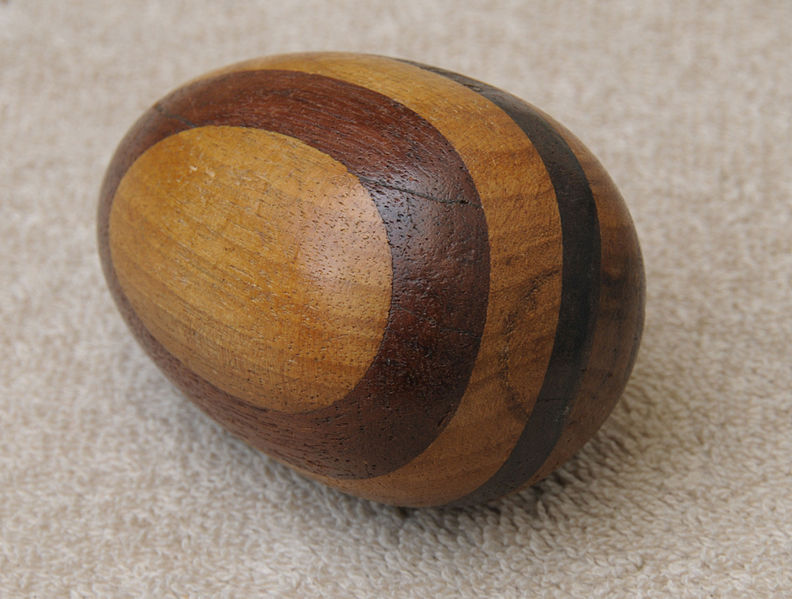
Darning egg

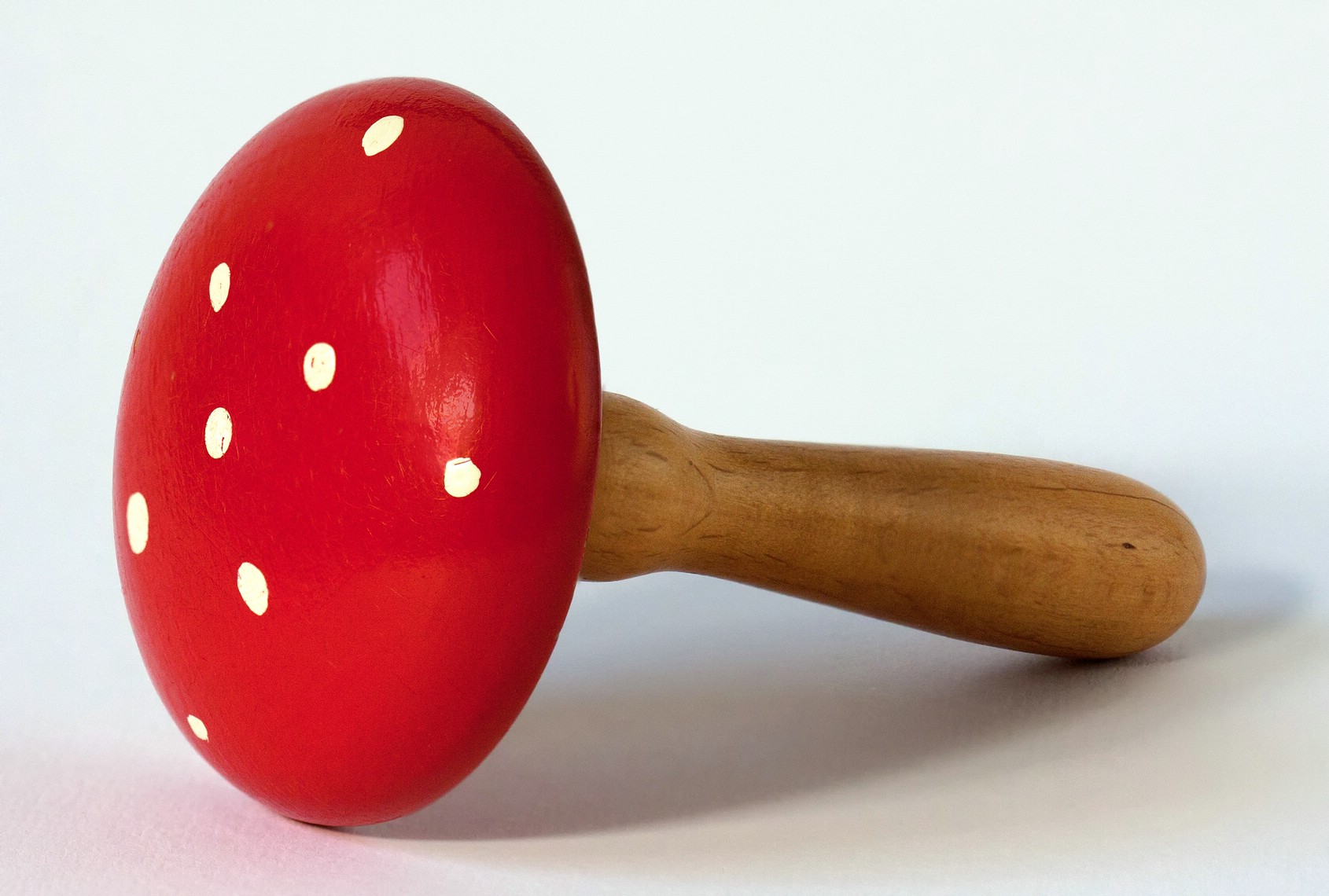
Wooden mushroom used for darning

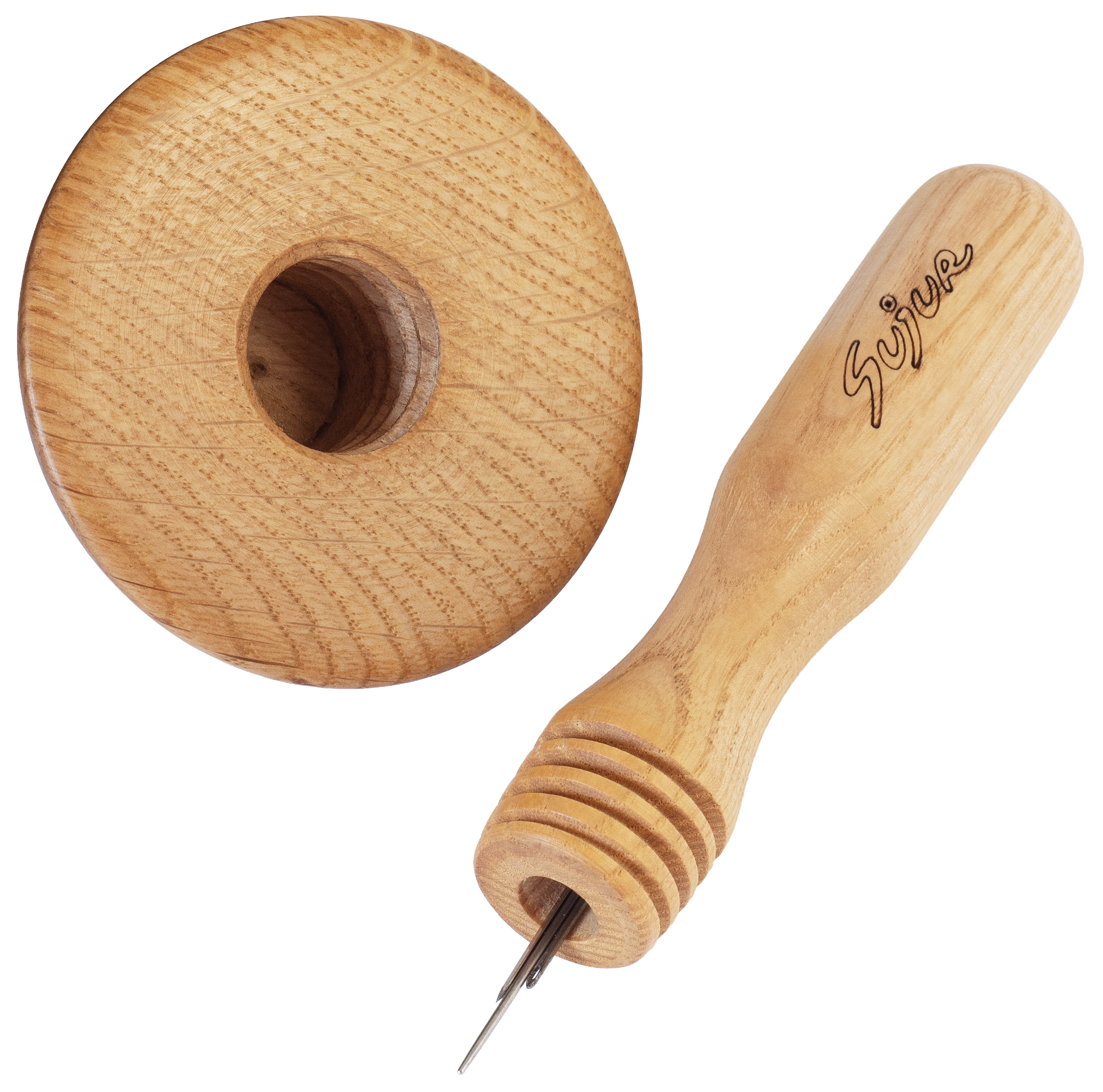
Darning mushroom with a built-in needlecase for darning needles

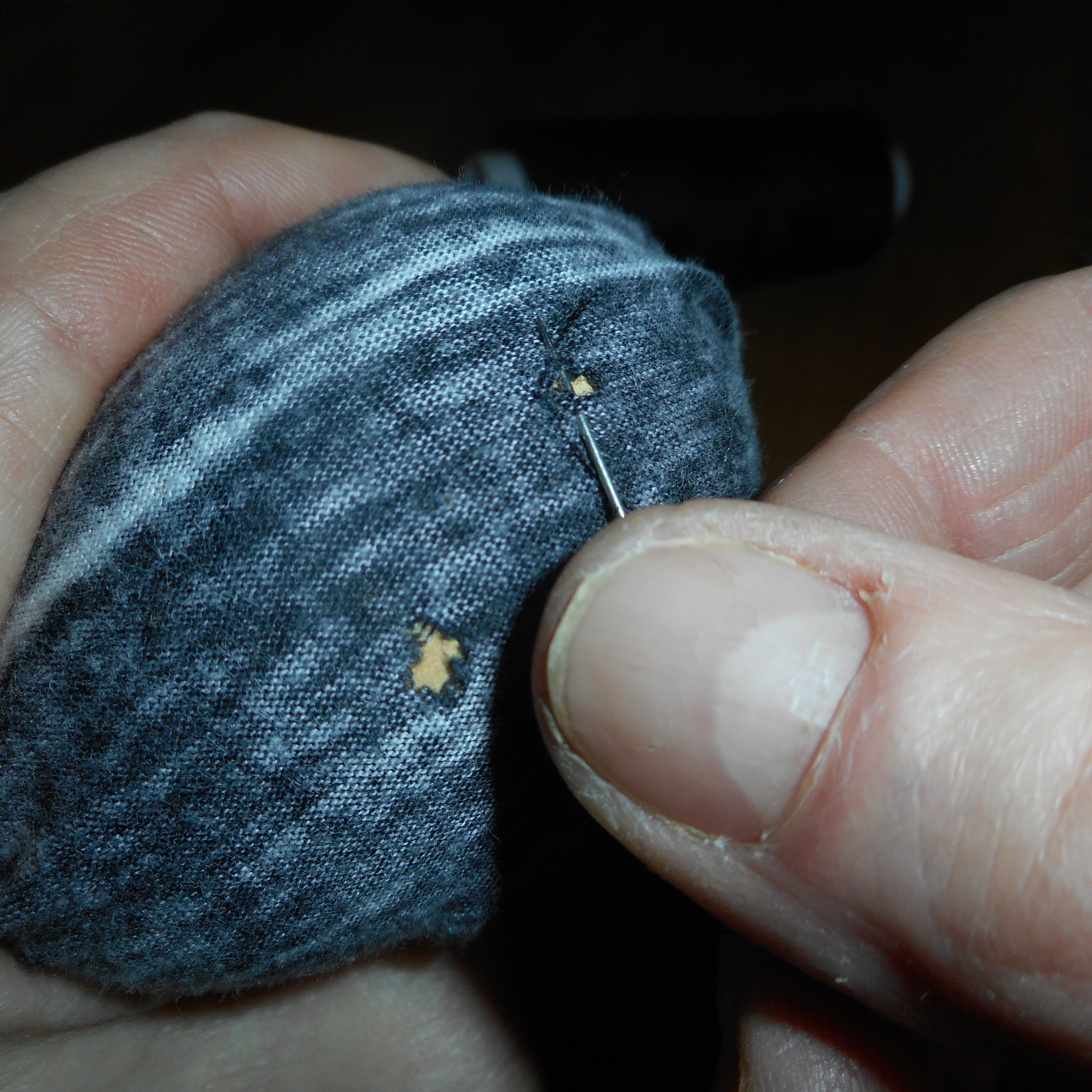
Using a mushroom; the needle must be fine enough to pass between the threads

- A darning needle is typically as blunt-tipped as possible, to avoid splitting the threads as it is passed through the item being repaired. This is especially true of larger needles for darning coarse knitted cloth.

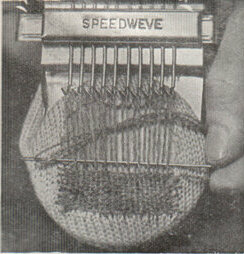
Darning loom with hook heddles and a darning needle.

- A darning loom is a very small hand-held loom for weaving patches into the original cloth. They have an egg portion which goes inside the cloth and is grooved; the rest of the loom goes on the outside, and the two parts are held together by an elastic band. The loom is warped and woven upon with a needle, which also serves as a beater batten. Darning looms typically have heddles made of flip-flopping rotating hooks, which raise and lower the warp, creating sheds to make weaving the patch easier. The hooks, when vertical, have the weft threads looped around them horizontally. If the hooks are flopped over one side or the other, the loop of weft twists, raising one or the other side of the loop, which creates the shed and countershed. The spacing of the hooks generally doesn't match the threadcount of the cloth. Other devices sold as darning looms are just a darning egg and a separate comb-like piece with teeth to hook the warp over; these are used for repairing knitted garments and are like a linear knitting spool. Darning looms were sold during World War Two clothing rationing in the United Kingdom and in Canada, and some are homemade.

== Pattern darning ==
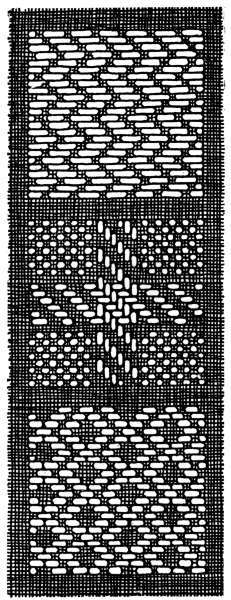
Pattern darning

Pattern darning is a simple and ancient embroidery technique in which contrasting thread is woven in and out of the ground fabric using rows of running stitches which reverse direction at the end of each row. The length of the stitches may be varied to produce geometric designs. Traditional embroidery using pattern darning is found in Africa, Japan, Northern and Eastern Europe, the Middle East, Mexico and Peru.

Pattern darning is also used as a filling stitch in blackwork embroidery.

== Around the world ==
=== India ===
Rafoogari is the name for the art of darning in India and neighbouring countries of the subcontinent, where this art of healing the cloth is used for practical and traditional reasons. Though wearing restored clothes is associated with poverty and thus seen as shameful, this technique has been used by highly skilled "rafoogars" to restore some priceless clothes such as Pashmina shawls, silks, woolen clothes, and even fine cotton. Kashmiris are considered the best rafoogars, who have imparted their knowledge to artists all over India. Rafoogars still exist across India.

The Foundation of Indian Contemporary Art has been trying to preserve this art, and some artists in India still practice it as a hereditary art form, passed down for over sixteen generations.

=== Iran ===
Rofoogari is an old traditional skill or technique used to fix or repair historic textiles and woven materials and fabrics in Iran. Having an old history in weaving and textile making, the culture of rofoo, or "vasleh- Pineh" arose among the poor and unwealthy communities. They used patches to cover the damaged parts and go over the space by running stitches and sometimes decorative ones. In some communities due to lack of resources, they repeated the process as they needed, which is why we find very colorful, different patterned vasleh- pineh in galleries and museums.

== See also ==
- Mending
- Conservation and restoration of textiles
- Boro
- Invisible mending
