= Holbein stitch =

Embroidery stitch worked to look the same from both sides

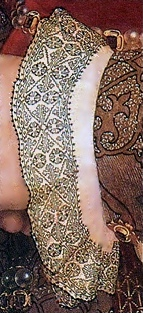
Blackwork embroidery in Holbein stitch. Detail of portrait of Jane Seymour by Hans Holbein the Younger, 1537.

Holbein stitch is a simple, reversible line embroidery stitch most commonly used in Blackwork embroidery and Assisi embroidery. The stitch is named after Hans Holbein the Younger (1497-1543), a 16th-century portrait painter best known for his paintings of Henry VIII and his children, almost all of whom are depicted wearing clothing decorated with blackwork embroidery.

Although superficially similar to Back Stitch the Holbein stitch produces a smoother line and a pattern that is identical on both sides of the fabric. It can be worked in straight lines, diagonally, or in a stepped fashion to make a zigzag line and is well suited to creating outlines or intricate filling patterns.

Holbein stitch is also known as double running stitch, line stitch, Spanish stitch, Chiara stitch and two-sided line stitch.

== Description of the technique ==
Holbein stitch is usually worked on an even-weave fabric where the threads can be counted to ensure perfect regularity and is worked in two stages. Firstly, a row of evenly spaced running stitches is worked along the line to be covered. Then the return journey is completed, filling in the spaces between stitches made on the first journey and sharing the same holes:

Stitch diagram for working Holbein stitch

== Modern Holbein techniques ==
In recent years Holbein stitch has become fashionable again, along with modern blackwork and modern Assisi embroidery. Formality has given way to a more light-hearted approach, and motifs include cute cats and other cartoon-style animals. Classic map samplers and chessboard designs have also been updated, and the use of colours is much more imaginative and daring.

== Photo gallery ==
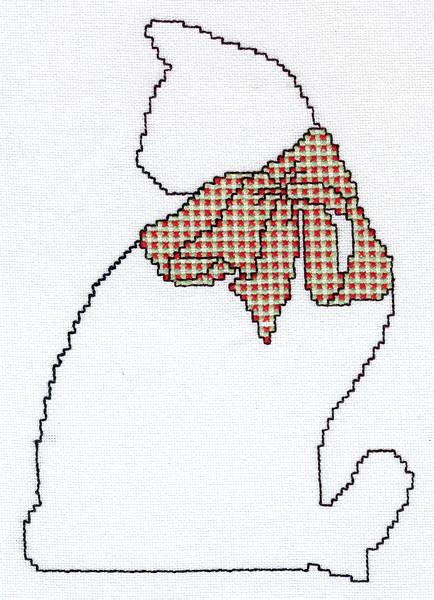
Cat in Holbein stitch and cross stitch

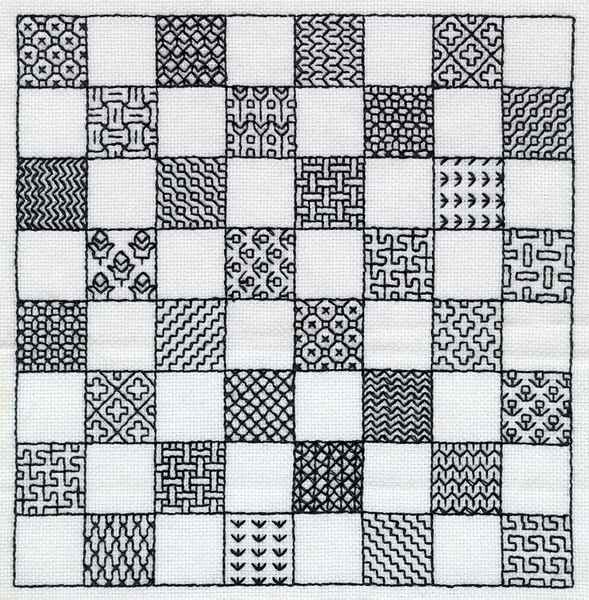
Modern chessboard in Holbein stitch

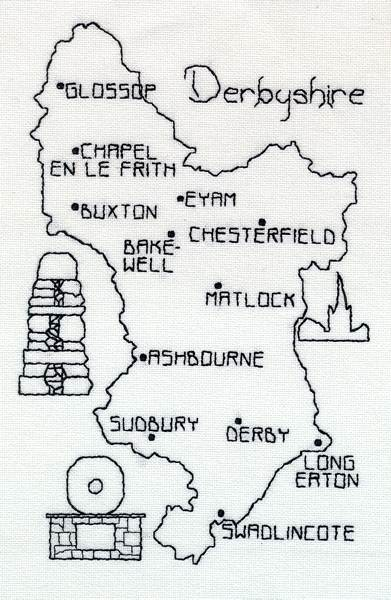
Modern Holbein-stitched map of Derbyshire

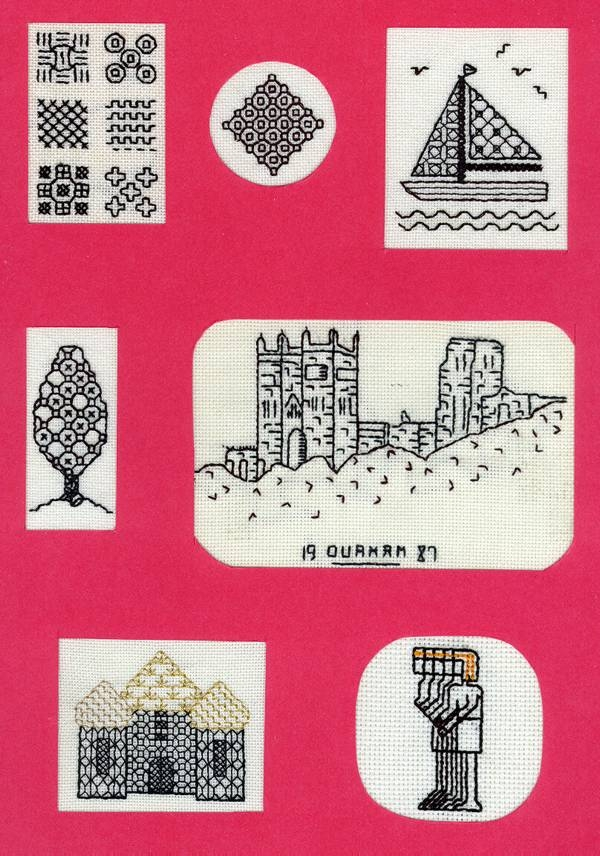
Collection of motifs in Holbein stitch and metal thread

== See also ==
- Assisi embroidery
- Blackwork embroidery
- Counted-thread embroidery
- Embroidery stitches
