= Assisi embroidery =

Form of counter-thread embroidery art

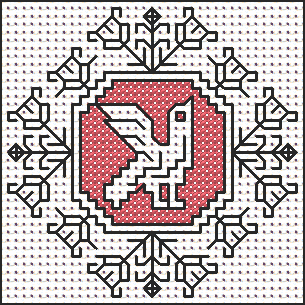
Pattern for a simple Assisi bird motif

Assisi embroidery is a form of counted-thread embroidery based on a Renaissance Italian needlework tradition in which the background is filled with embroidery stitches and the main motifs are outlined but not stitched. The name is derived from the Italian town of Assisi where the modern form of the craft originated.

== Description of the technique ==
Assisi work uses a method known as voiding in which cross-stitch fills the background while the motif itself is left blank. Holbein stitch, a style of linear blackwork, is used to outline and emphasize the motif and to create surrounding decorative scrollwork.

Traditionally, Assisi embroidery was rarely executed in cross-stitch but was most often in long-armed cross-stitch. Examples employing other stitches, such as Italian cross-stitch and Algerian plait stitch, are also known. The colours of thread used were red, blue, green or gold for the background and black or brown for the outlines. Traditional motifs were largely heraldic, especially heraldic beasts, and typically featured symmetrically arranged pairs of animals and birds surrounded by ornate filigree borders.

In the oldest pieces, the figures were drawn freehand on the fabric and surrounded with Holbein stitch. The background, often cream linen, was filled as well as possible. For more modern pieces the pattern was constructed carefully on a paper grid in much the same way as counted cross-stitch patterns are created. Today Assisi embroidery is nearly always done this way.

== History ==
Historically, Italy has had a long tradition of bright and colourful embroidery. In the thirteenth and fourteenth centuries monastic embroideries developed a simpler style where designs and motifs were voided on fine linen cloth with the outlines and background embroidered in coloured silk. Motifs were strongly influenced by traditional designs of bird or animal pairs surrounded by elaborate scrollwork. These early articles were most often used for religious purposes, e.g., altar cloths and chasubles.

By the sixteenth century Assisi work had become more popular and employed a wider range of motifs, many based on Renaissance imagery of satyrs, demons and ancient mythical creatures.

In the eighteenth and nineteenth centuries, however, this form of embroidery fell into decline and many of the designs and motifs were lost. It was only at the turn of the twentieth century that the practice was revived in the Italian town of Assisi from which this form of embroidery gets its name. St. Anne's Convent in October 1902 established the Laboratorio Ricreativo Festivo Femminile San Francesco di Assisi. The aim of this handicrafts workshop was to revive traditional local handicrafts and provide employment to poor women to supplement their incomes. This cottage industry flourished and these designs using the counted thread technique quickly spread throughout Italy, Europe and further abroad.

== Modern Assisi work ==
A modern version of Assisi embroidery has been evolving in the twenty-first century. Many different colours and patterns are used for the background, and the motifs are extremely varied. However, the revived traditional version is still practised in the town of Assisi where one can see the local women sitting in front of their houses and embroidering Assisi work items for the local co-operative embroidery shop.

== Photo gallery ==
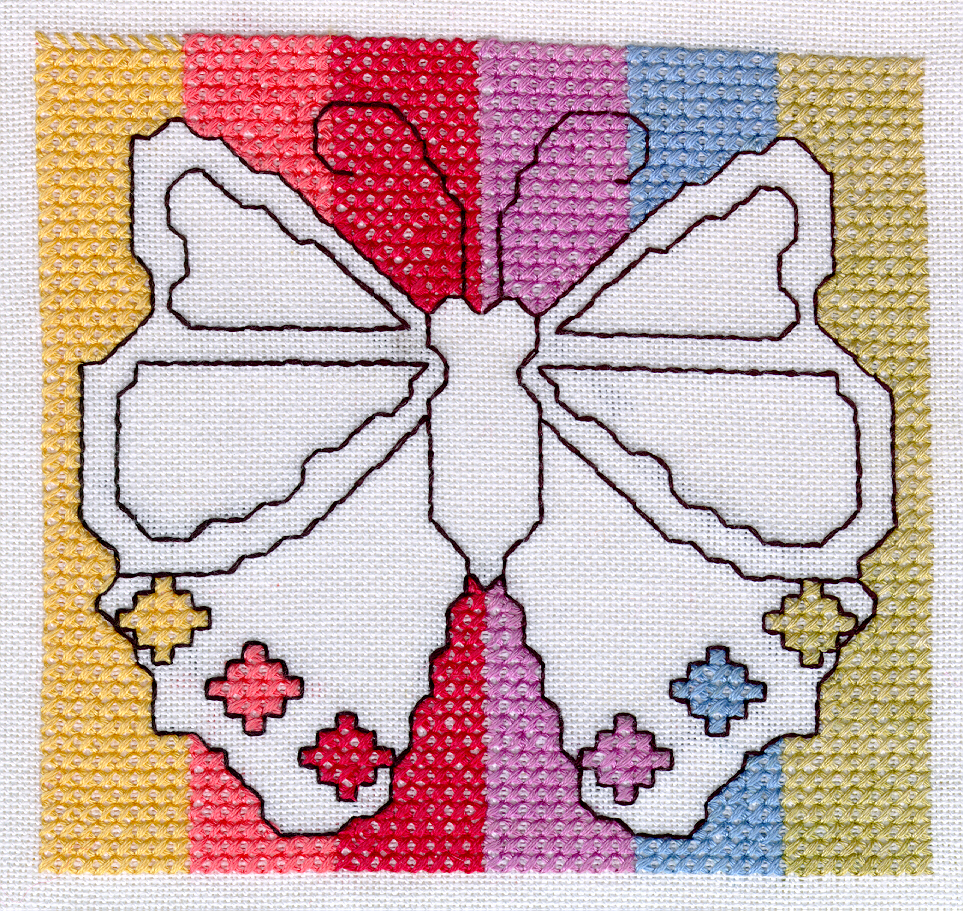
Butterfly in modern Assisi work

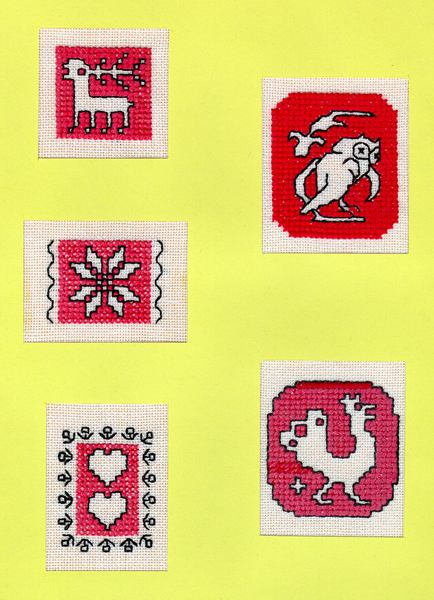
Examples of both modern and traditional shapes embroidered in a monochrome style

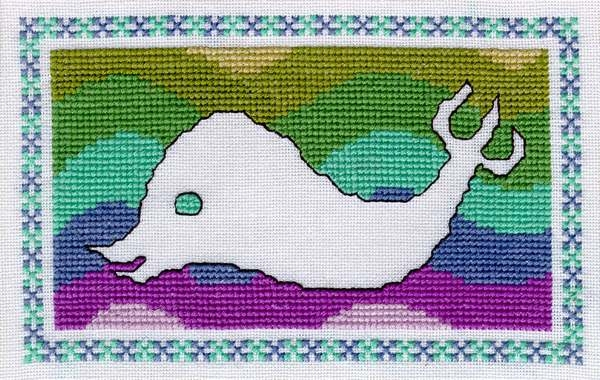
Dolphin in modern Assisi work

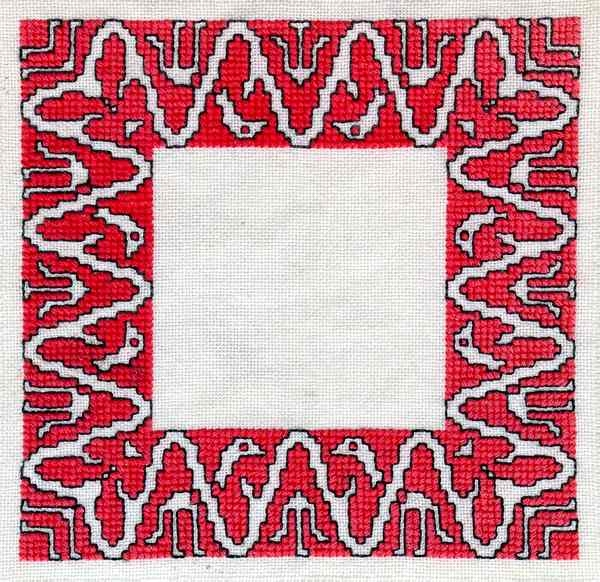
Border with a modern mythical creature in a traditional monochrome style

== See also ==
- Category:Embroidery
- Counted-thread embroidery
- Cross stitch
- History, working-methods, free designs
