= Backstitch =

Versatile stitch

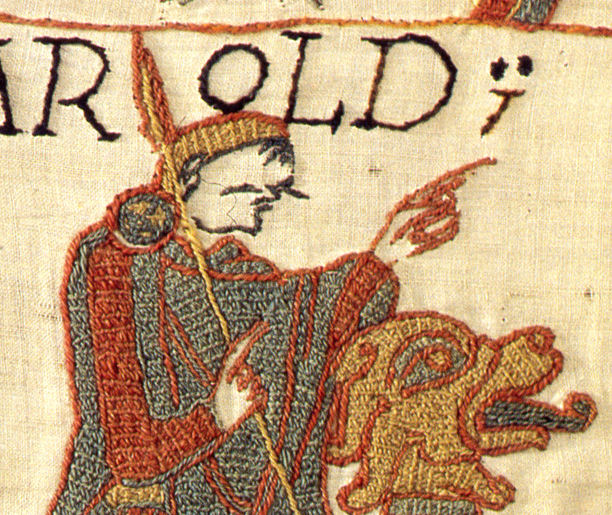
Detail of the Bayeux Tapestry showing text and outlines in stem stitch.

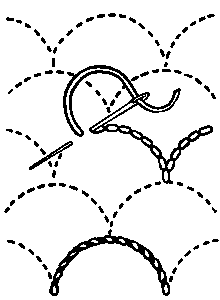
Basic backstitch

Backstitch or back stitch and its variants stem stitch, outline stitch and split stitch are a class of embroidery and sewing stitches in which individual stitches are made backward to the general direction of sewing. In embroidery, these stitches form lines and are most often used to outline shapes and to add fine detail to an embroidered picture. It is also used to embroider lettering. In hand sewing, it is a utility stitch which strongly and permanently attaches two pieces of fabric. The small stitches done back-and-forth makes the back stitch the strongest stitch among the basic stitches. Hence it can be used to sew strong seams by hand, without a sewing machine.

== Description of the technique ==
A versatile stitch which is easy to work, backstitch is ideal for following both simple and intricate outlines and as a foundation row for more complex embroidery stitches such as herringbone ladder filling stitch. Although superficially similar to the Holbein stitch, which is commonly used in blackwork embroidery, backstitch differs in the way it is worked, requiring only a single journey to complete a line of stitching.

Basic backstitch is the stitch used to outline shapes in modern cross-stitch, in Assisi embroidery and occasionally in blackwork.

Stem stitch is an ancient technique; surviving mantles embroidered with stem stitch by the Paracas people of Peru are dated to the first century BCE. Stem stitch is used in the Bayeux Tapestry, an embroidered cloth probably dating to the later 1070s, for lettering and to outline areas filled with couching or laid-work.

Split stitch in silk is characteristic of Opus Anglicanum, an embroidery style of Medieval England.

Stitch diagram for working Back stitch

Backstitch is most easily worked on an even-weave fabric, where the threads can be counted to ensure regularity, and is generally executed from right to left. The stitches are worked in a 'two steps forward, one step back' fashion, along the line to be filled, as shown in the diagram.

Neatly worked in a straight line this stitch resembles chain stitching produced by a sewing machine.

The back stitch can also be used as a hand sewing utility stitch to attach two pieces of fabric together.

== Variants ==
Variants of backstitch include:

- Basic backstitch or point de sable.
- Threaded backstitch combines the foundation stitch (Backstitch) and threading.
- Pekinese stitch, a looped interlaced backstitch
- Stem stitch, in which each stitch overlaps the previous stitch to one side, forming a twisted line of stitching, with the thread passing below the needle. It is generally used for outlining shapes and for stitching flower stems and tendrils.
- Whipped back stitch using thread of a different color than the original stitch, the needle is passed under the stitch without piercing the fabric, repeated to create a colorful twisted effect
- Outline stitch, sometimes distinguished from stem stitch in that the thread passes above rather than below the needle.
- Split stitch, in which the needle pierces the thread rather than returning to one side.
- Ringed back stitch, back stitches are worked to create half rings, these are completed by a second row of stitches to form ring outlines

=== Stitch gallery ===
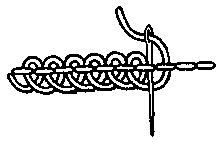
Pekinese stitch

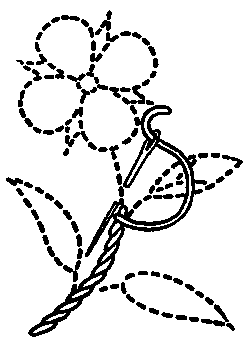
Stem stitch

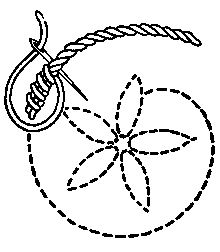
Whipped stem stitch

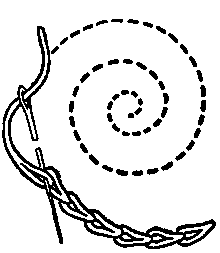
Split stitch

== See also ==
- Assisi embroidery
- Blackwork embroidery
- Cross-stitch
- Embroidery stitches
