= Blackwork =

Technique of monochrome embroidery originating in Tudor England

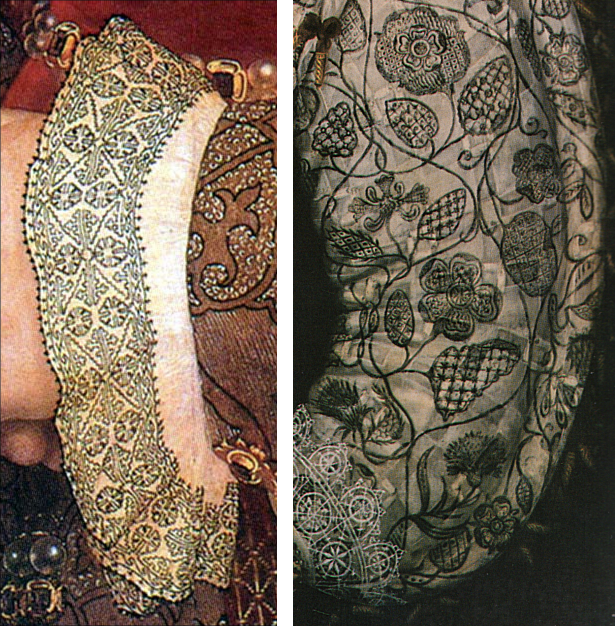
Counted stitch blackwork, 1530s (left), and free stitch blackwork, 1590s (right).

Blackwork, sometimes historically termed Spanish blackwork, is a form of embroidery generally worked in black thread, although other colours are also used on occasion, as in scarletwork, where the embroidery is worked in red thread. Most strongly associated with Tudor period England, blackwork typically, though not always, takes the form of a counted-thread embroidery, where the warp and weft yarns of a fabric are counted for the length of each stitch, producing uniform-length stitches and a precise pattern on an even-weave fabric. Blackwork may also take the form of free-stitch embroidery, where the yarns of a fabric are not counted while sewing.

Traditionally, blackwork is worked in silk thread on white or off-white linen or cotton fabric. Sometimes metallic threads or coloured threads are used for accents.

== Technique ==
The stitches used for counted thread blackwork are double running or holbein stitch, backstitch, and sometimes stem stitch. Historically, blackwork was worked on plain-weave fabric. Modern embroiderers often use an even-weave fabric made especially for counted thread work.

Historically, there were three common styles of blackwork. In the earliest forms of blackwork, counted stitches were worked to make a geometric or small floral pattern. Most modern blackwork is produced in this style, especially commercially produced patterns marketed for embroidery hobbyists.

Later blackwork featured large designs of flowers, fruit, and other patterns connected by curvilinear stems. These were frequently not counted thread work, and were outlined with stem stitch, with the outlined patterns filled in with geometric counted designs.

In the third style of blackwork, the outlined patterns were "shaded" with random stitches called seed stitches. This style of blackwork imitates etchings or woodcuts.

== History ==
European blackwork embroidery was preceded by Mamluk Egyptian running stitch embroideries and Indian Kasuti. The key difference between these techniques and European blackwork is that they are often more colorful. Kasuti sometimes uses multiple colors in a piece, and Mamluk embroideries typically were monochrome, but done in black, red, blue, green, and yellow.

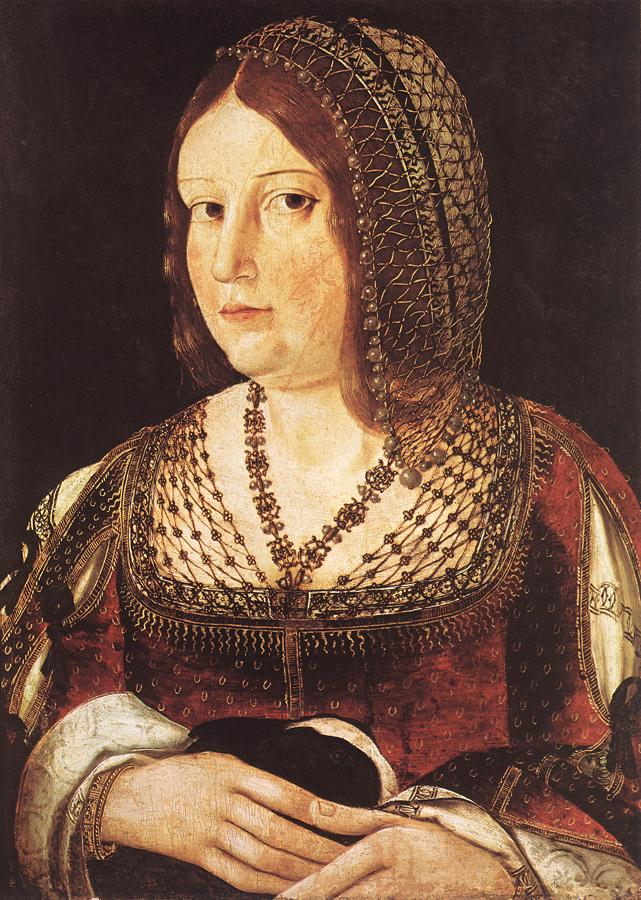
Early Spanish blackwork: Borgoña's Lady with Hare wears a chemise embroidered at the neckline and on the sleeves, c. 1505, Toledo.

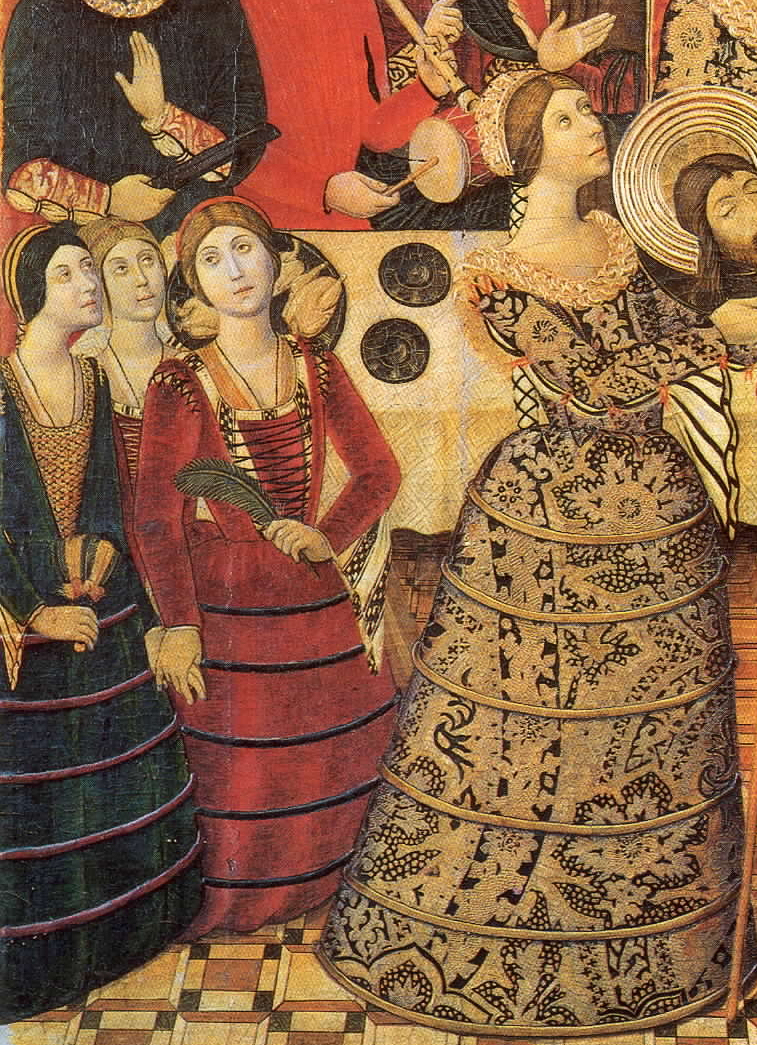
Historically, blackwork was used on chemises, shirts or smocks in England from the time of Henry VIII. The common name "Spanish work" was based on the belief that Catherine of Aragon brought many blackwork garments with her from Spain, and portraits of the later 15th and early 16th centuries show black embroidery or other trim on Spanish chemises. (Note: A.J.B. Wace "debunked" the Spanish origin in the 1930s, but if the black trim on these chemises from the 1470s is embroidery, this would support an early Spanish origin.) However, black embroidery was known in England before 1500. Geoffrey Chaucer in the Canterbury Tales describes the clothing of the miller's wife, Alison: "Of white, too, was the dainty smock she wore, embroidered at the collar all about with coal-black silk, alike within and out."

Black silk was bought to embroider sleeves for Princess Mary in October 1543. Blackwork in silk thread on linen was the most common domestic embroidery technique for clothing (shirts, smocks, sleeves, ruffs, and caps) and for household items such as cushion covers throughout the reign of Elizabeth I, but lost popularity as a technique by the 17th century. (Note: See also 1550–1600 in fashion)

Historic English blackwork embroidery is rare to find well-preserved, as the iron-based dye used to create the thread's black colour was corrosive, and there are currently no conservation techniques that can stop the decay. Black embroidery silk from outside England, such as Spain, contained less iron in the black dye and so blackwork worked using non-English silk tends to survive in better condition.

=== 16th-century blackwork ===
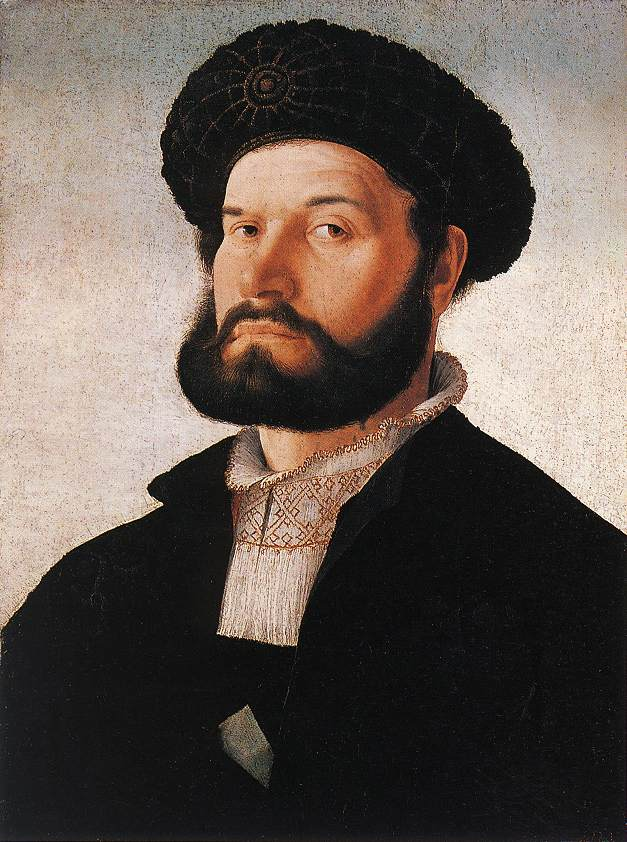
Geometric scarletwork, Venice, 1520s.

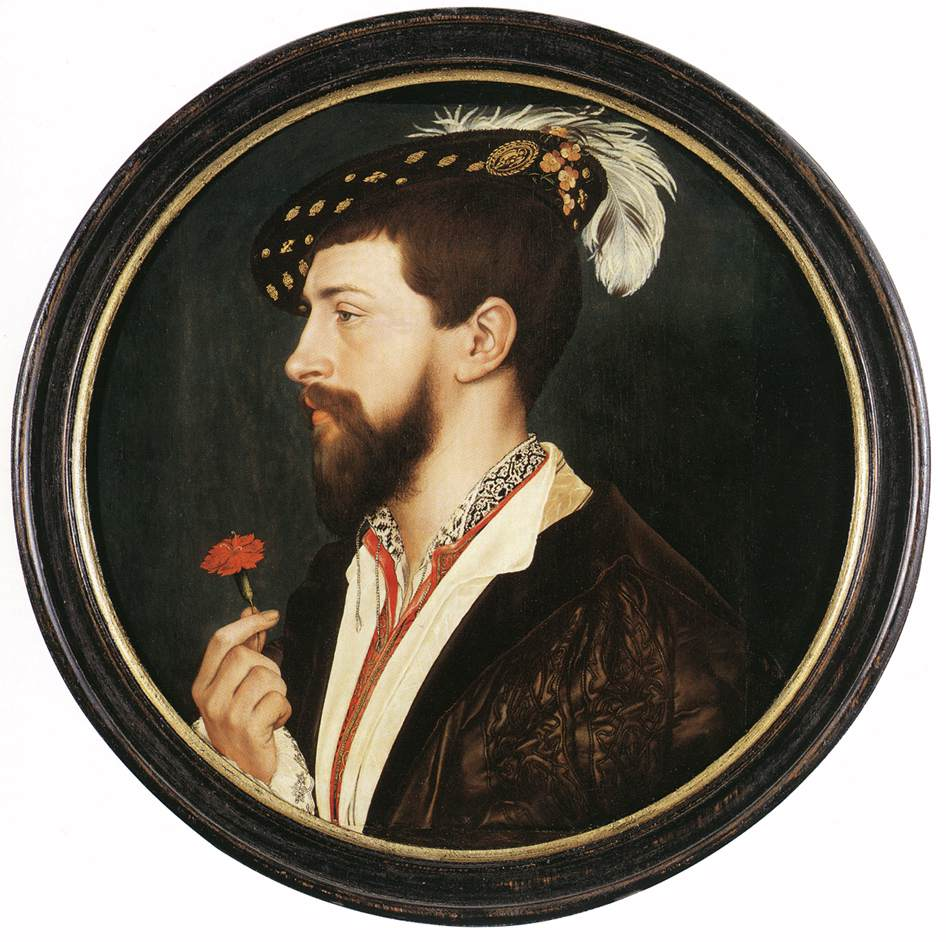
Blackwork embroidery on both an outer and inner collar. Portrait of Simon George by Hans Holbein the Younger, 1535.

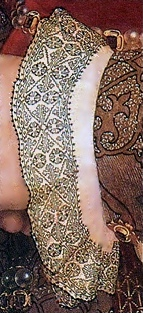
Blackwork embroidery in Holbein stitch. Detail of portrait of Jane Seymour by Holbein, 1537.

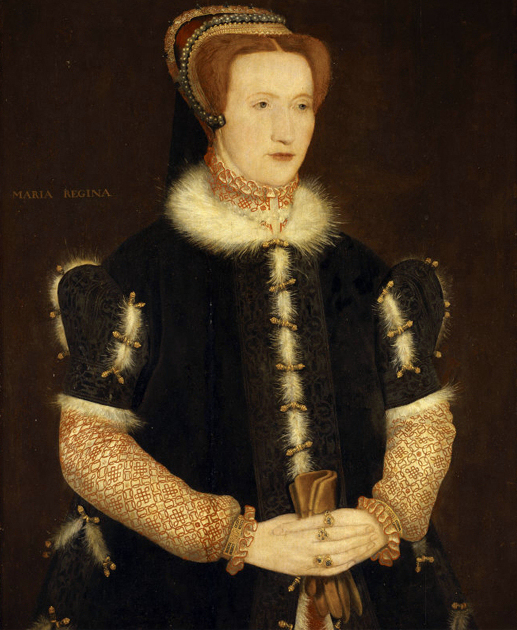
Bess of Hardwick in geometric scarletwork, 1550s.

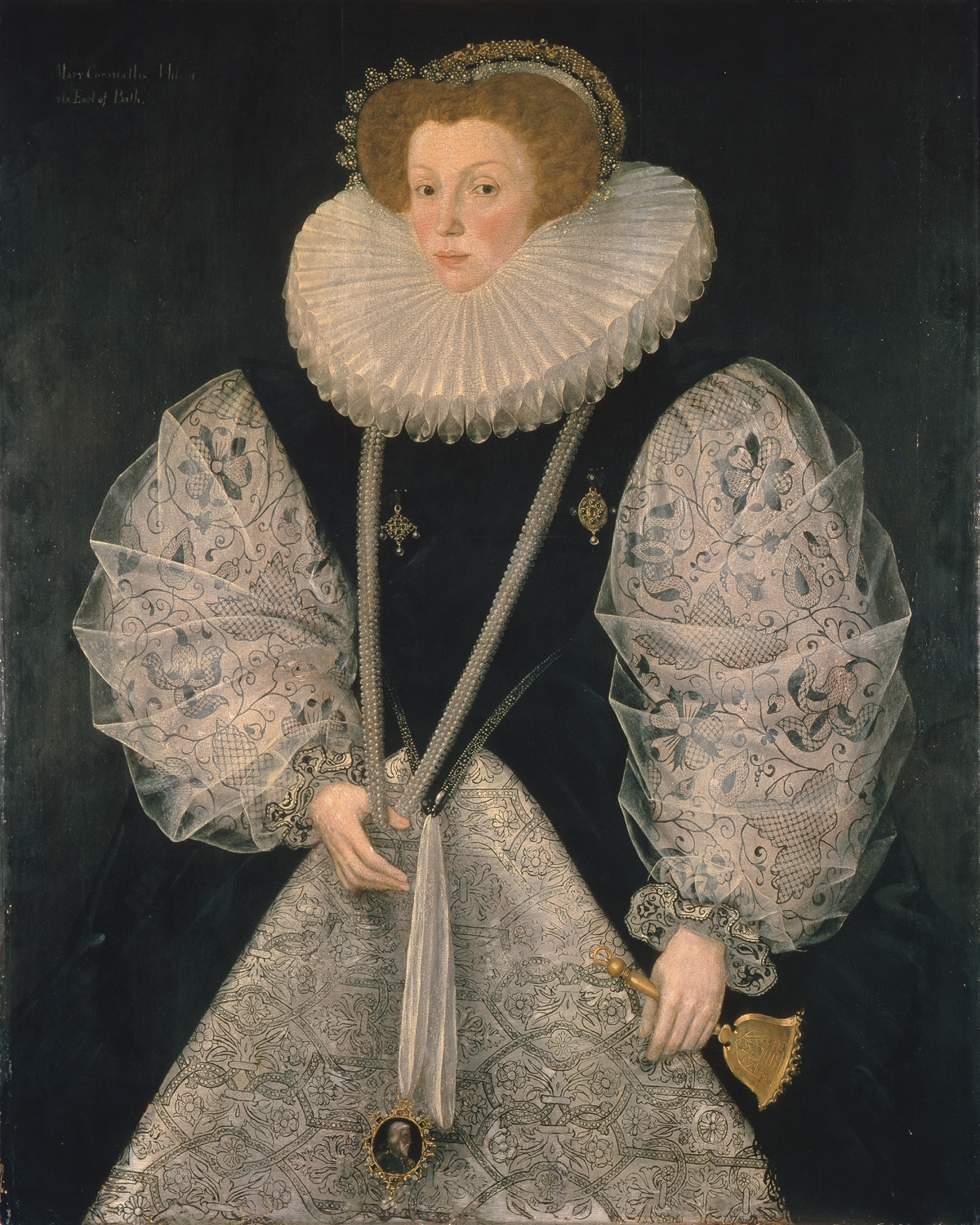
Blackwork sleeves with large free-stitched flowers filled with geometric patterns, under sheer linen oversleeves, and a counted blackwork forepart under her skirt. Portrait of Mary Cornwallis by George Gower, c. 1580.

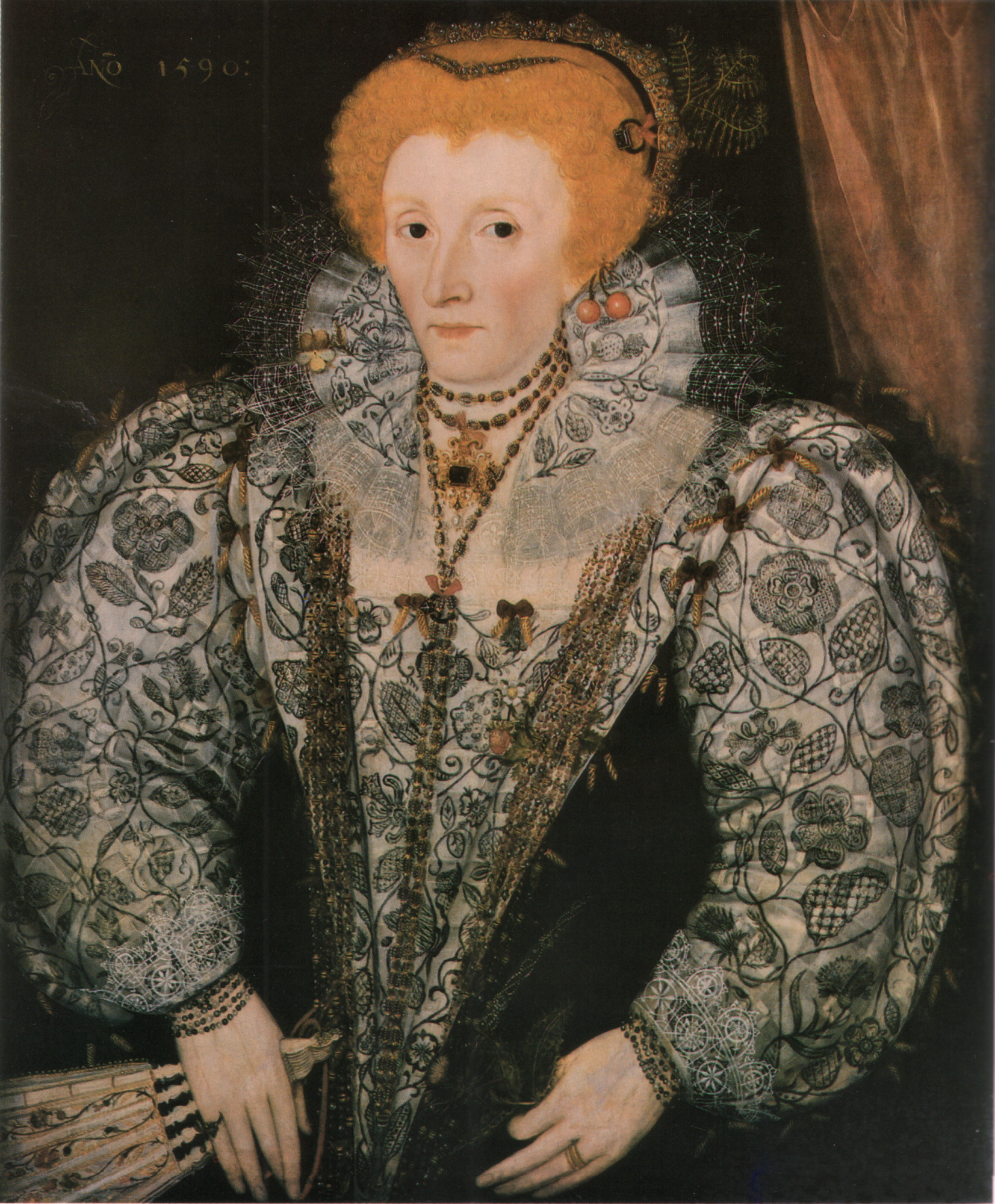
Elizabeth I wearing free-stitched blackwork sleeves, stomacher, and collar (beneath a sheer linen ruff), c. 1590

English blackwork cushion cover, late 16th century. Linen embroidered with silk and metallic thread, in a mix of counted and free-stitched stitches, including buttonhole, chain, double running, overcast, plaited braid, and square open work stitches. Art Institute of Chicago textile collection.

== Modern blackwork ==
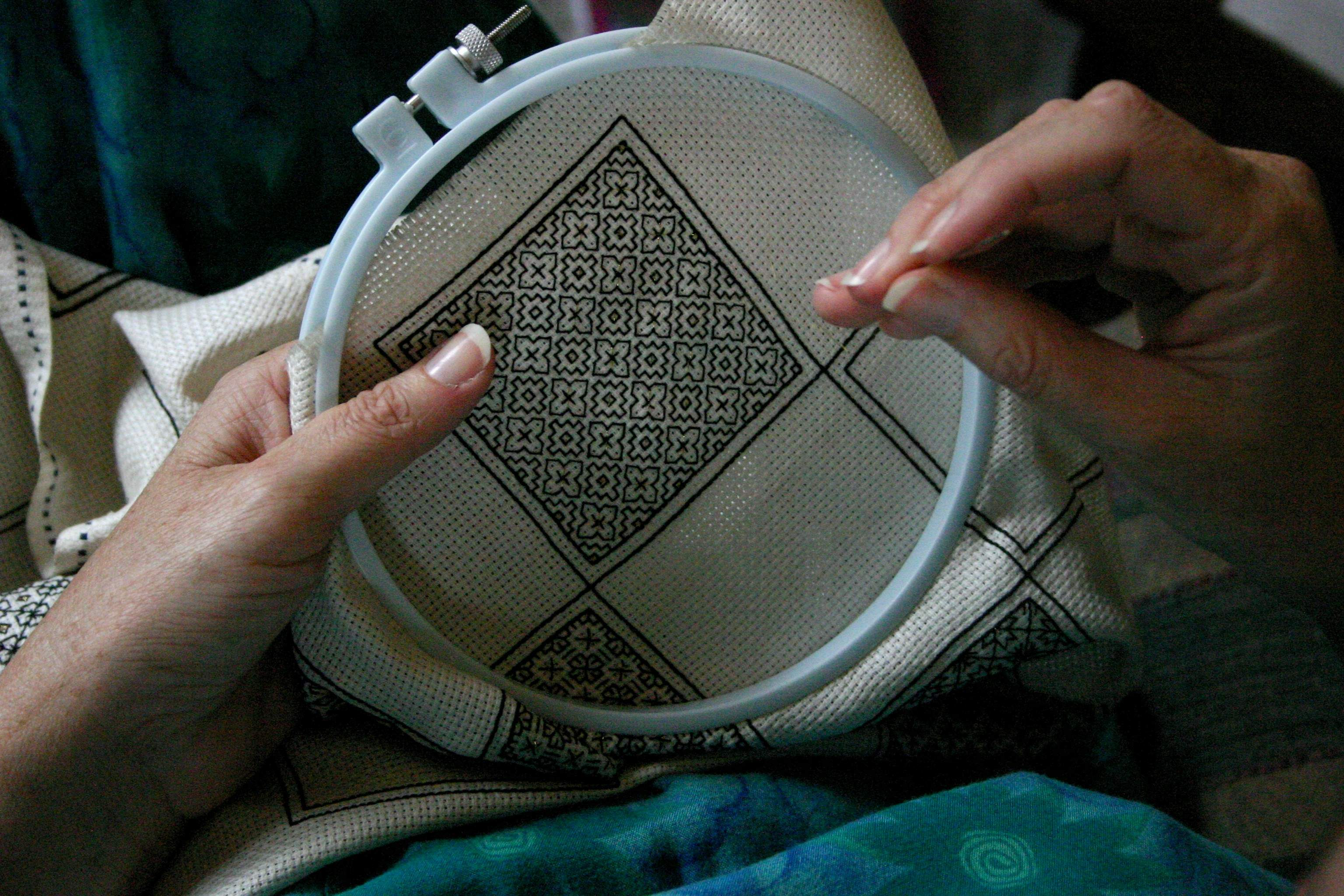
Counted-thread geometric patterns in modern blackwork

Blackwork remains popular as an embroidery technique. Common subjects among hobbyists include chessboards, maps, Tudor houses, roses and cats. Much of the success of a blackwork design using free embroidery depends on how tone values are translated into stitches.

Today, the term "blackwork" is used to refer to the technique, rather than the precise colour used in the embroidery.

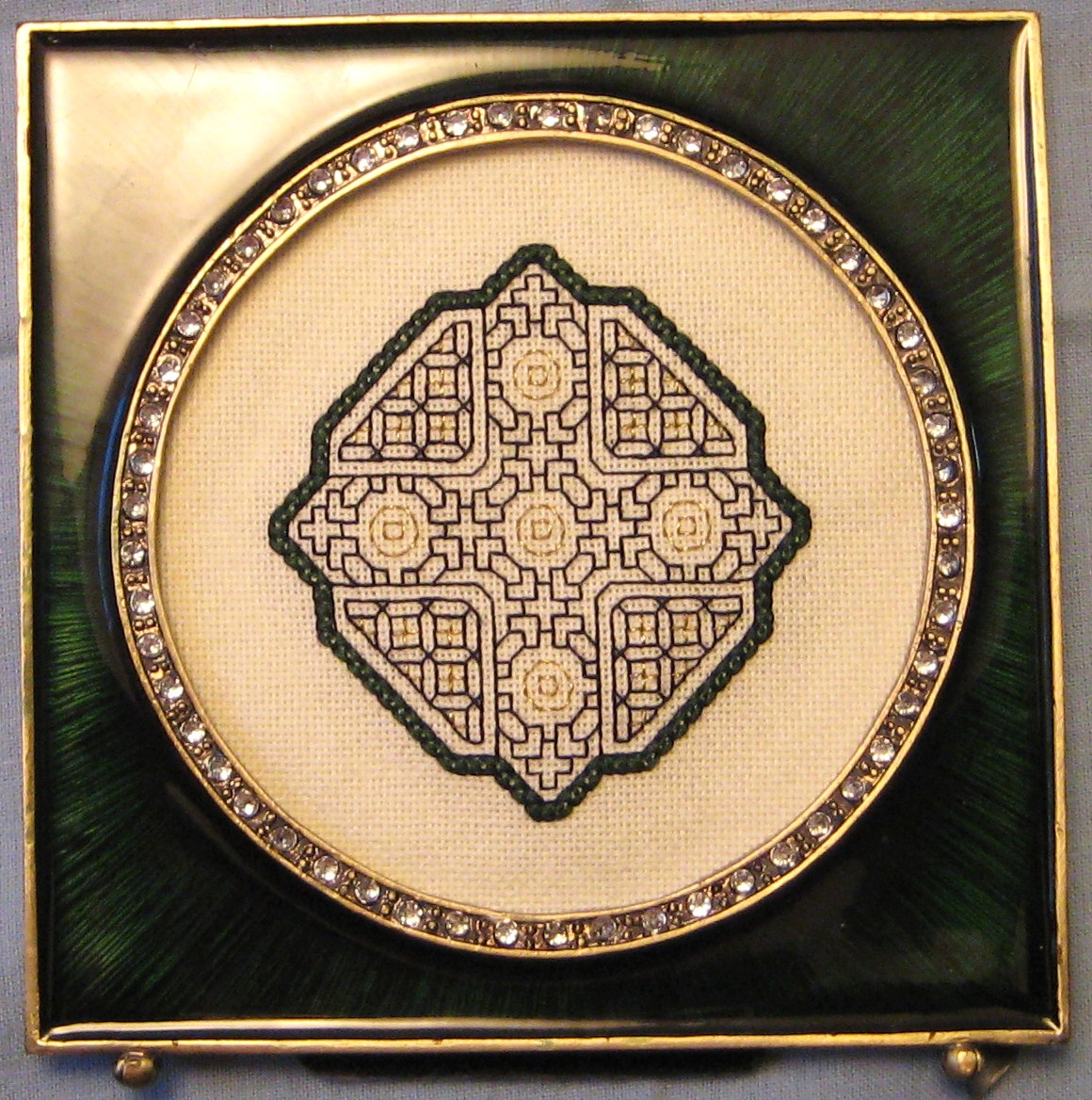
Framed Celtic design in blackwork

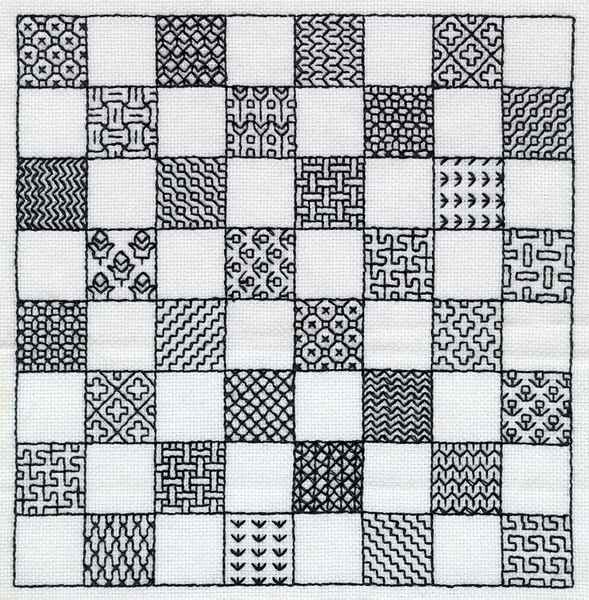
Chessboard

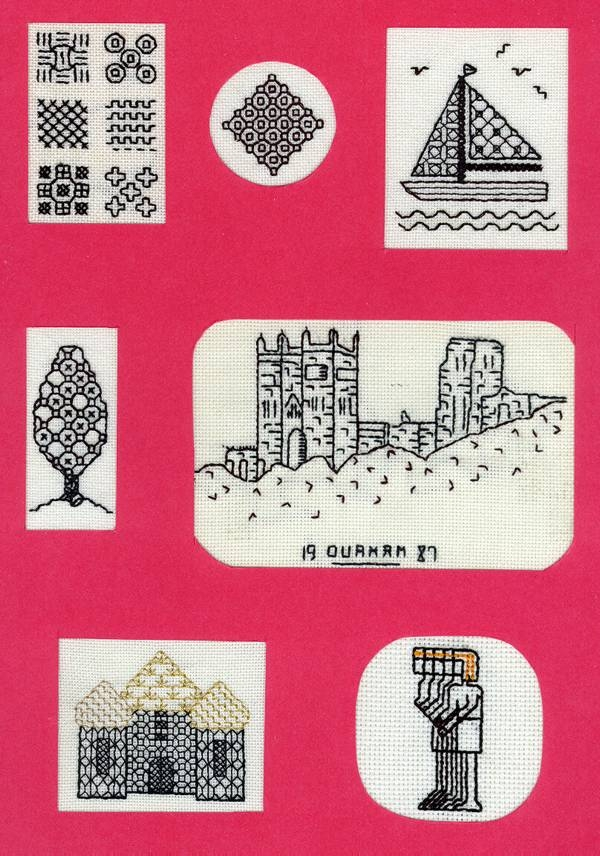
Sampler

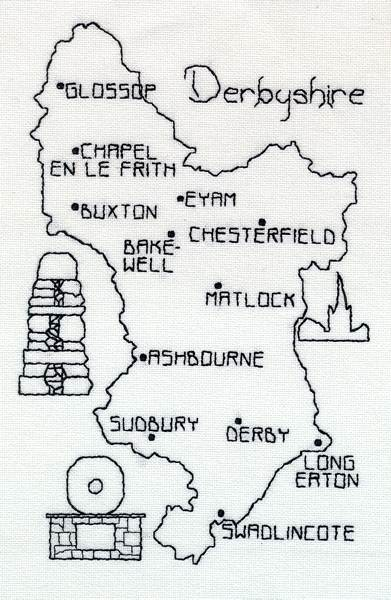
Map of Derbyshire

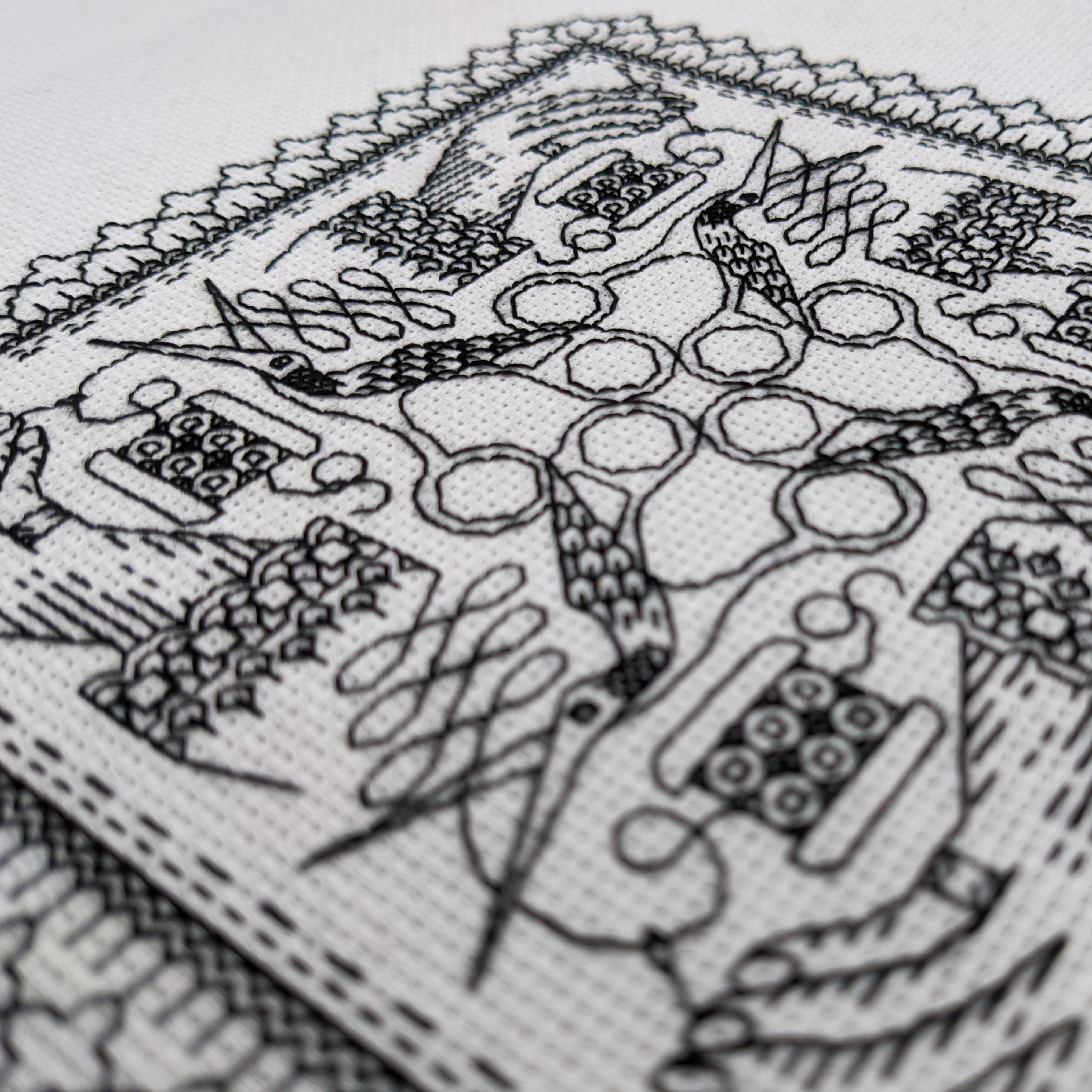
A visual love letter to blackwork embroidery

== See also ==
- Holbein stitch
- English embroidery
- Assisi embroidery, an Italian form of counted-thread embroidery
- Kasuti embroidery

== Bibliography ==
- Altherr, Ilse. Reversible Blackwork: Book One, Self-Published; 1978.
- Altherr, Ilse. Blackwork and Holbein Embroidery: Book Two, Self-Published; Second edition 1981.
- Arnold, Janet: Queen Elizabeth's Wardrobe Unlock'd, Leeds: W S Maney and Son Ltd, 1988. ISBN 0-901286-20-6
- Barnett, Lesley. Blackwork, Search Press, 1999.
- Day, Brenda. Blackwork: A New Approach, Guild of Master Craftsman, 2000.
- Digby, George Wingfield. Elizabethan Embroidery. New York: Thomas Yoseloff, 1964.
- Drysdale, Rosemary. The Art of Blackwork Embroidery, Mills & Boon, 1975.
- Geddes, Elizabeth and Moyra McNeill. Blackwork Embroidery, Dover Publications, 1976.
- Gostelow, Mary. Blackwork, Batsford, 1976; Dover reprint, 1998, ISBN 0-486-40178-2
- Hogg, Becky. Blackwork (Essential Stitch Guide), Search Press, 2011.
- Langford, Pat. Embroidery Ideas from Blackwork, Kangaroo Press Ltd., 1999.
- Lucano, Sonia. Made in France: Blackwork, Murdoch Books, 2010.
- New Anchor Book of Blackwork Embroidery Stitches, David & Charles, 2005.
- Pascoe, Margaret. Blackwork Embroidery: Design and Technique, B T Batsford Ltd; 2nd edition 1990.
- Reader's Digest Complete Guide to Needlework, 1979, ISBN 0-89577-059-8.
- Scoular, Marion. Why call it blackwork? Sherwood Studio, 1993.
- Wace, A.J.B.: "English Embroideries Belonging to Sir John Carew Pole, Bart", Walpole Society Annual, 1932–33, Vol. XXI, p. 56, note 2.
- Wilkins, Lesley. Beginner's Guide to Blackwork, Search Press, 2002.
- Wilkins, Lesley. Traditional Blackwork Samplers, Search Press, 2004.
- Zimmerman, Jane D. The Art of English blackwork, J.D. Zimmerman, 1996.
