= Shanghai History Museum =

Museum in Shanghai, China

Coordinates: 31°14′32.07″N 121°29′41.97″E

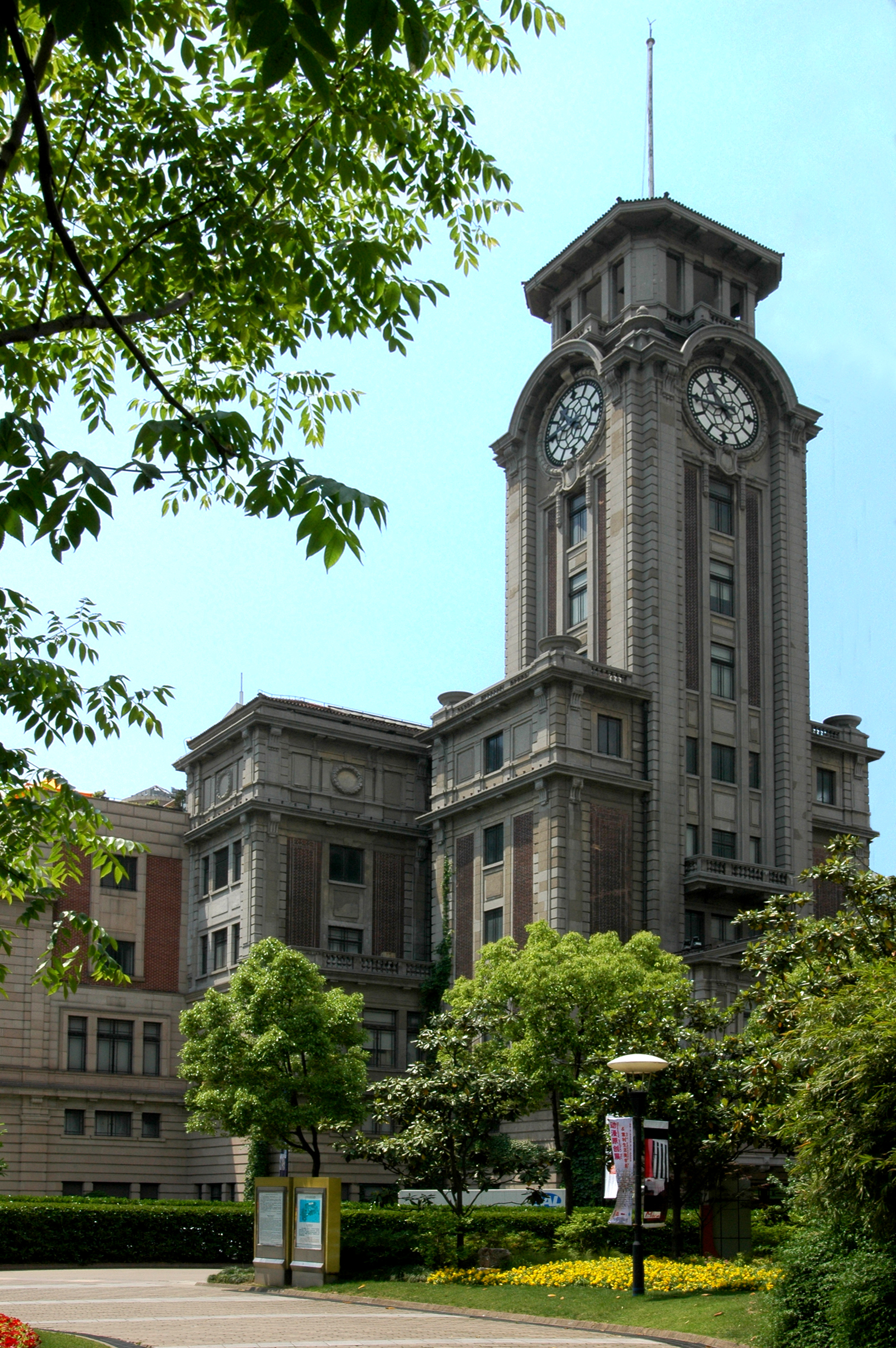
Former Shanghai Race Club club house and former Shanghai Art Museum building, now Shanghai History Museum.

The Shanghai History Museum (Chinese: 上海市历史博物馆; pinyin: Shànghǎi Shì Lìshǐ Bówùguǎn), or Shanghai Revolution History Museum, is a museum dedicated to the history of the city of Shanghai, China.

The museum's collections focus on the approximately a hundred years in the history of Shanghai from the opening of the port in 1843 to the communist take-over in 1949. The museum's oldest relics are from 6,000 years ago. It features a cannon used in the first Opium War, a sedan chair, and two bronze lions that used to adorn the Hongkong and Shanghai Banking Corporation on the Bund. Other exhibits reveal the history of art, culture and industrialization in Shanghai. The neo-classical Shanghai Race Club building (1934) that houses the museum, has an imposing 10-storey tall tower which was long a landmark of central Shanghai.

== History ==
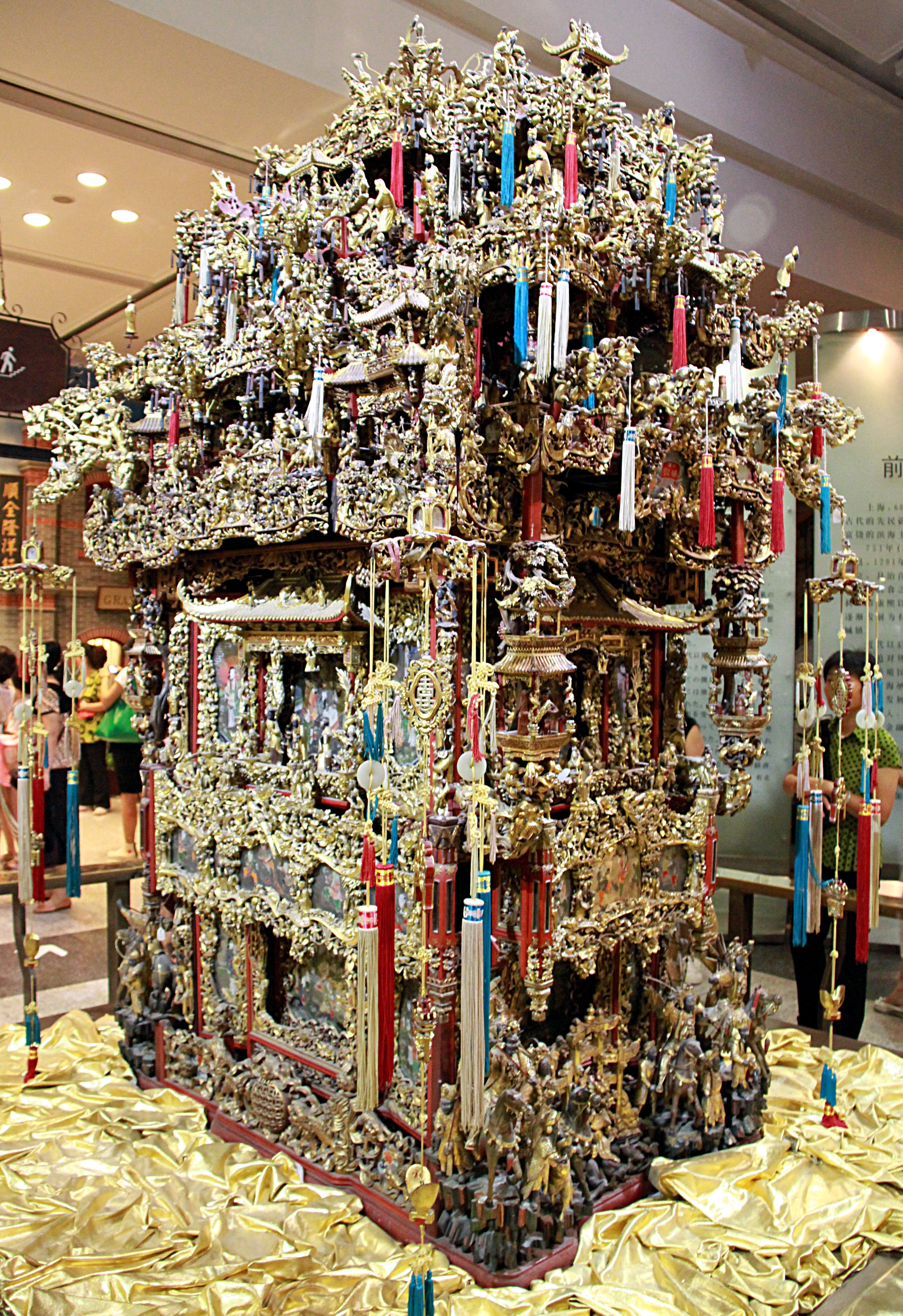
Wedding sedan chair in the museum's collection.

The Shanghai History Museum was established in 1983 as the "Shanghai History and Artefacts Exhibition Hall". It first opened to the public on May 27, 1984, on the premises of the Shanghai Agriculture Exhibition. The museum was moved to a new location (1286 Hong Qiao Road) and renamed to the "Shanghai History Museum" in 1991. The main museum was closed due to land redevelopment in 1999, but "temporary" exhibitions of the museum's holdings continue to be mounted elsewhere. Since May 2001, the museum has maintained an exhibition room at the base of the Oriental Pearl Tower in Lujiazui, called the "Shanghai History and Development Exhibition", with select items from the museum's collection. The museum was reopened in its full and extended size in 2018 at the club house of the former Shanghai Race Club.

== Collection ==
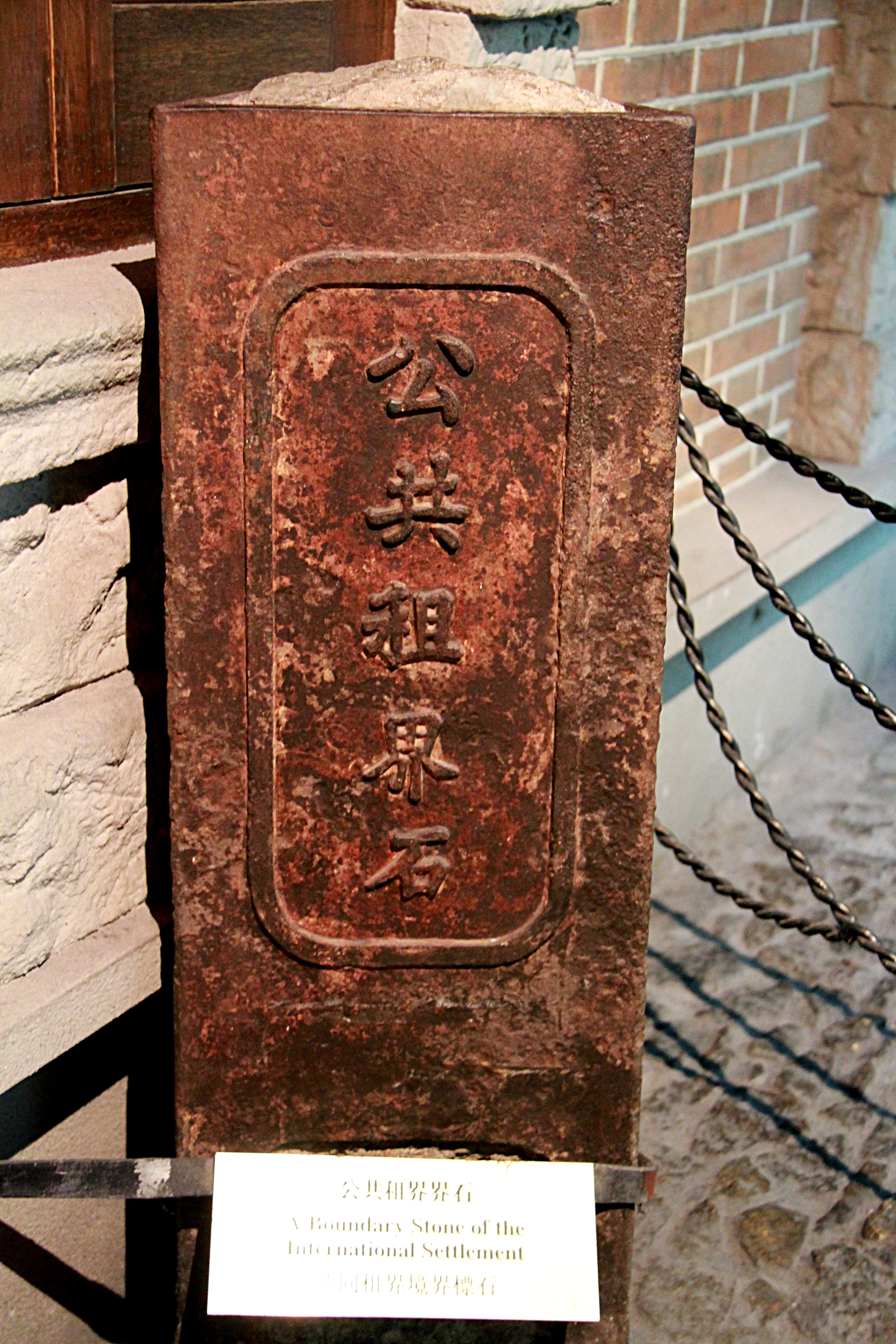
Boundary marker from the International Settlement.

The collection of the Shanghai History Museum contains more than 30,000 items. Of these, about 18,000 items pertain to the modern history of the city, a portion of these items found its way into the museum from the governors of the Foreign Concessions. Notable items in the collection include: Gu Embroidery of flowers, insects, and fish by the Ming-Dynasty "needle saint" Han Ximeng (韩希孟); a scroll by Hou Tongceng; the Golden Sutras of the Qibao Temple; a bronze cannon called "General Zhen Yuan" that once belonged to Chen Huacheng (1776–1842), a Qing Dynasty general responsible for Shanghai's defenses during the First Opium War; a "big hua qian" coin issued by the Taiping Heavenly Kingdom; a pair of bronze lions from the entrance of the former HSBC Building; and boundary markers from the French Concession and the Shanghai International Settlement (1893).

== Location ==
The Shanghai History Museum's latest and permanent home since 2018 is the former Shanghai Race Club club house, which had been empty for several years after the Shanghai Art Museum moved out in 2012. After moving in, about four-fifths of the collection is on public display for the first time. The museum didn't have a permanent location before. There have been repeated calls to build a new building for the museum for many years, but commercial considerations (as the exhibition room at the basement of the Oriental Pearl Tower contributed to the commercial success of the tower as a tourist attraction) and budgetary constraints prevented this from occurring for several years. Other parts of the collection had been on loan to specialist museums within Shanghai.

== See also ==
- Shanghai Museum
