= Han Ximeng =

Chinese silk embroiderer (1573–1644)

- 韓希孟
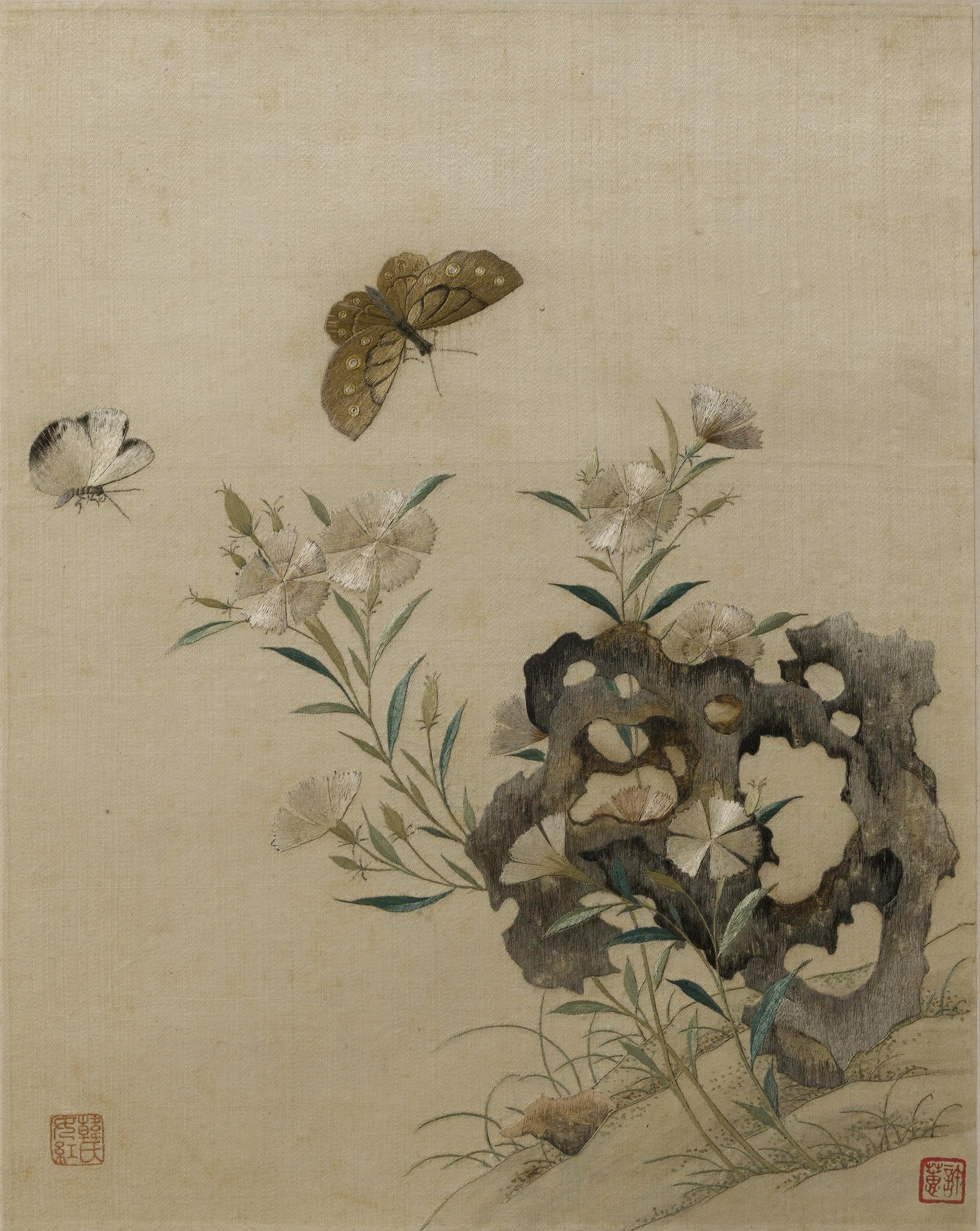
- Embroidery work by Han from the collection of Shanghai Museum
- Born: 1573; Hangzhou
- Died: 1644 (aged 70–71)
- Other names: Han Hsi-meng; Needle Saint; Master Embroiderer of Wuling
- Spouse: Gu Shouqian

Han Ximeng (Chinese: 韓希孟; pinyin: Hán Xīmèng; 1573–1644), also known as Han Hsi-meng, was a master of Chinese silk embroidery, reputed as the "Needle Saint" (针圣).

== Biography ==
Han Ximeng was born in 1573 and died in 1644. She was originally from Hangzhou.

Gu Xiu (顾绣) embroidery originated from the family of Gu Mingshi (顧名世) during the Ming Dynasty in Songjiang, Jiangsu Province. Gu needlework imitates the brushstrokes of a painting and takes motifs from history and nature. Han was the wife of the second grandson of Gu Mingshi, Gu Shouqian (顧壽酒), and became the most famous proponent of Gu Xiu embroidery. She was reputed as "Needle Saint" (针圣) and was one of the most celebrated female embroiderers of the Ming period. The calligrapher and politician Dong Qichang was a contemporary admirer of her work.

Han developed her own personal embroidery style, painting the silk first and then embroidering on top, with an original use of colour. She did not follow set patterns. She adapted the artistry of pre-Renaissance embroidery paintings using techniques such as basket stitch, brocade, knotted stich, seed stitch and varying stitch lengths along curves. To achieve smooth transitions between colour shades, silk thread was split between long and short lengths rather than using the standard satin stitch.

In the spring of 1634, Han created eight pieces of embroidery modelled on court paintings from the Song and Yuan eras, due to her respect for Song-Yuan painting masters. She was also particularly noted for her detailed animals, birds and plants, with a "hairy" stitch used to depict the fur of animals.

Han signed her pieces as "Wuling xiushi" meaning Master Embroiderer of Wuling when she was at the height of her career. Twenty of her known works survive, with the majority of her surviving works bearing her embroidered red seal. In one example, the seal reads: "embroidered in middle of the 8th lunar month in 1641 in Xiao Cangzhou by Han Ximeng." Examples of Han's work are held in the collections of the Shanghai Museum, Liaoning Provincial Museum and Palace Museum in China.

Han's daughter Gu Lanyu continued her mother's work and opened a commercial embroidery studio, where she refined new subtle shading techniques and the use of fine threads.
