= Chinese embroidery =

Any of the various embroidery techniques of China

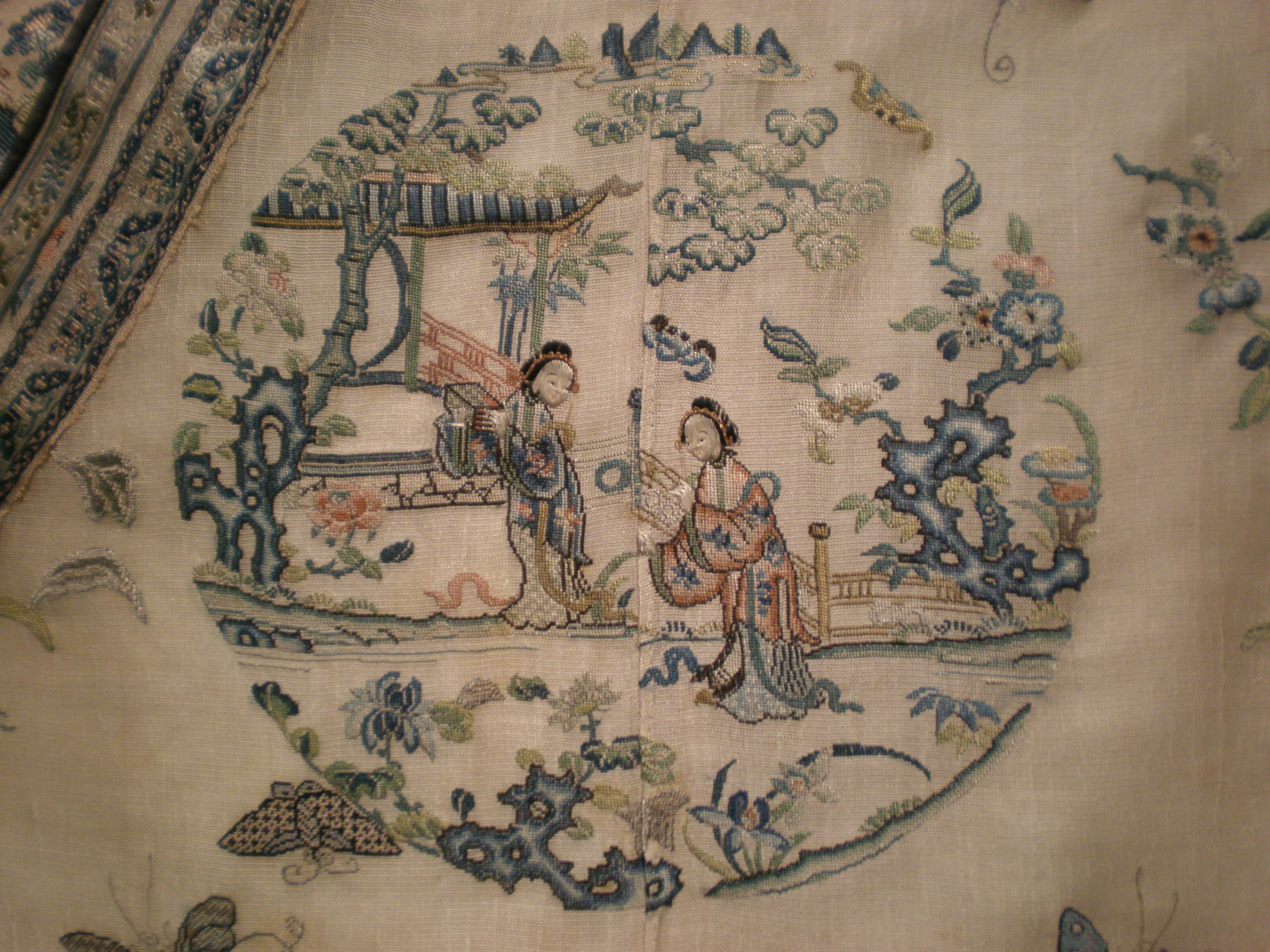
An elaborate Chinese silk embroidery, c. 1875–1900, Qing dynasty

Chinese embroidery refers to embroidery created by any of the cultures located in the area that makes up modern China. It is some of the oldest extant needlework. The four major regional styles of Chinese embroidery are Suzhou embroidery (Su Xiu), Hunan embroidery (Xiang Xiu), Guangdong embroidery (Yue Xiu) and Sichuan embroidery (Shu Xiu). All of them are nominated as Chinese Intangible Cultural Heritage.

== History ==
Chinese embroidery has a long history since the Neolithic age. Because of the quality of silk fibre, most Chinese fine embroideries are made in silk. Some ancient vestiges of silk production have been found in various Neolithic sites dating back 5,000–6,000 years in China. Currently the earliest real sample of silk embroidery discovered in China is from a tomb in Mashan in Hubei province identified with the Zhanguo period (5th–3rd centuries BC). After the opening of Silk Route in the Han dynasty, the silk production and trade flourished. In the 14th century, the Chinese silk embroidery production reached its high peak. Several major silk brocade styles had been developed, like Song Jin (宋锦 Song brocade) in Suzhou, Yun Jin (云锦 Cloud brocade) in Nanjing and Shu Jin (蜀锦 Shu brocade) in Sichuan.

Today, most handwork has been replaced by machinery, but some very sophisticated production is still hand-made. Modern Chinese silk embroidery by hand is still common in southern China.

== Genres ==
=== Major styles ===
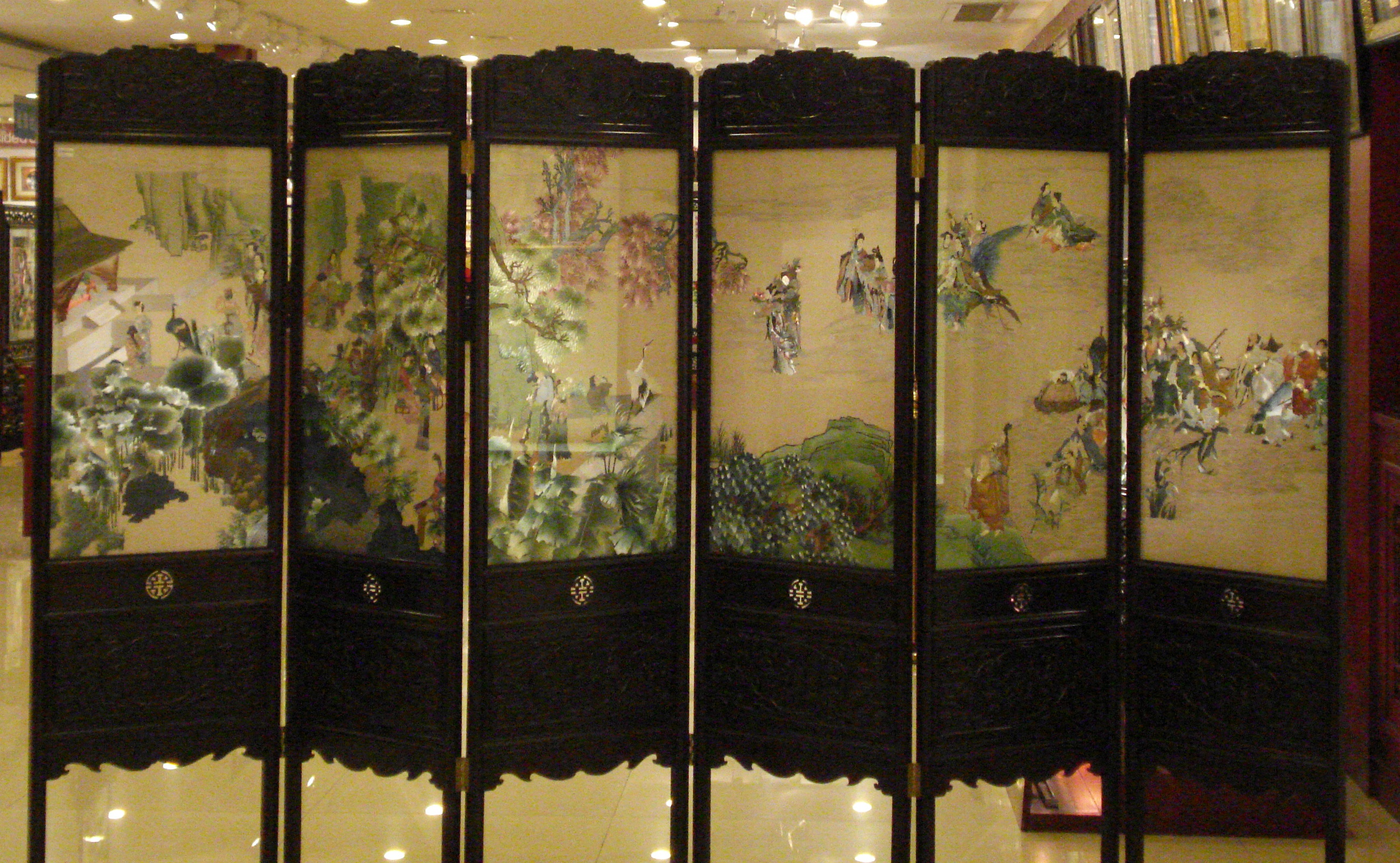
Screen with Suzhou embroidery.

- Su Xiu (苏绣) – Suzhou embroidery is crafted in areas around Suzhou, Jiangsu Province, having a history dating back 2,000 years. It is famous for its beautiful patterns, elegant colours, variety of stitches, and consummate craftsmanship. Its stitching is meticulously skillful, coloration subtle and refined. Suzhou artists are able to use more than 40 needlework and a 1,000 different types of threads to make embroidery, typically with nature and environment themes such as flowers, birds, animals and even gardens on a piece of cloth.
  - A rare subset is Su double-sided embroidery which requires ultimate skill and artistry. The front and back of the piece may have different designs, but the ends are not knotted but woven in so the back can't be distinguished.
- Xiang Xiu (湘绣) – Hunan embroidery comes from areas around Changsha, Hunan Province. It is distinct for its starkly elegant black, white and gray colouration. Its emphasis is on contrasts of light and shade that highlight the pattern texture to give a three-dimensional effect. Xiang embroidery composition combines void and solid imagery, utilizing empty space in the same way as Chinese ink and wash paintings.
- Yue Xiu/Guang Xiu (粤绣/广绣) – Guangdong embroidery is crafted in Chaozhou, Guangdong Province. It is composed of intricate but symmetrical patterns, vibrant colours, varied stitches and a defined weave. Its use of primary colors, light and shade are reminiscent of western paintings.
- Shu Xiu (蜀绣) – Sichuan embroidery comes from areas around Chengdu, Sichuan Province. It is among the oldest known embroidery styles in Chinese embroidery history. Its raw materials are satin and colored silk, its craftsmanship painstaking and refined. The emphasis is on even stitching, delicate coloration, and local flavor. Sichuan embroidery is used to decorate quilt covers, pillowcases, garments, shoes and painted screens.

=== Other styles ===
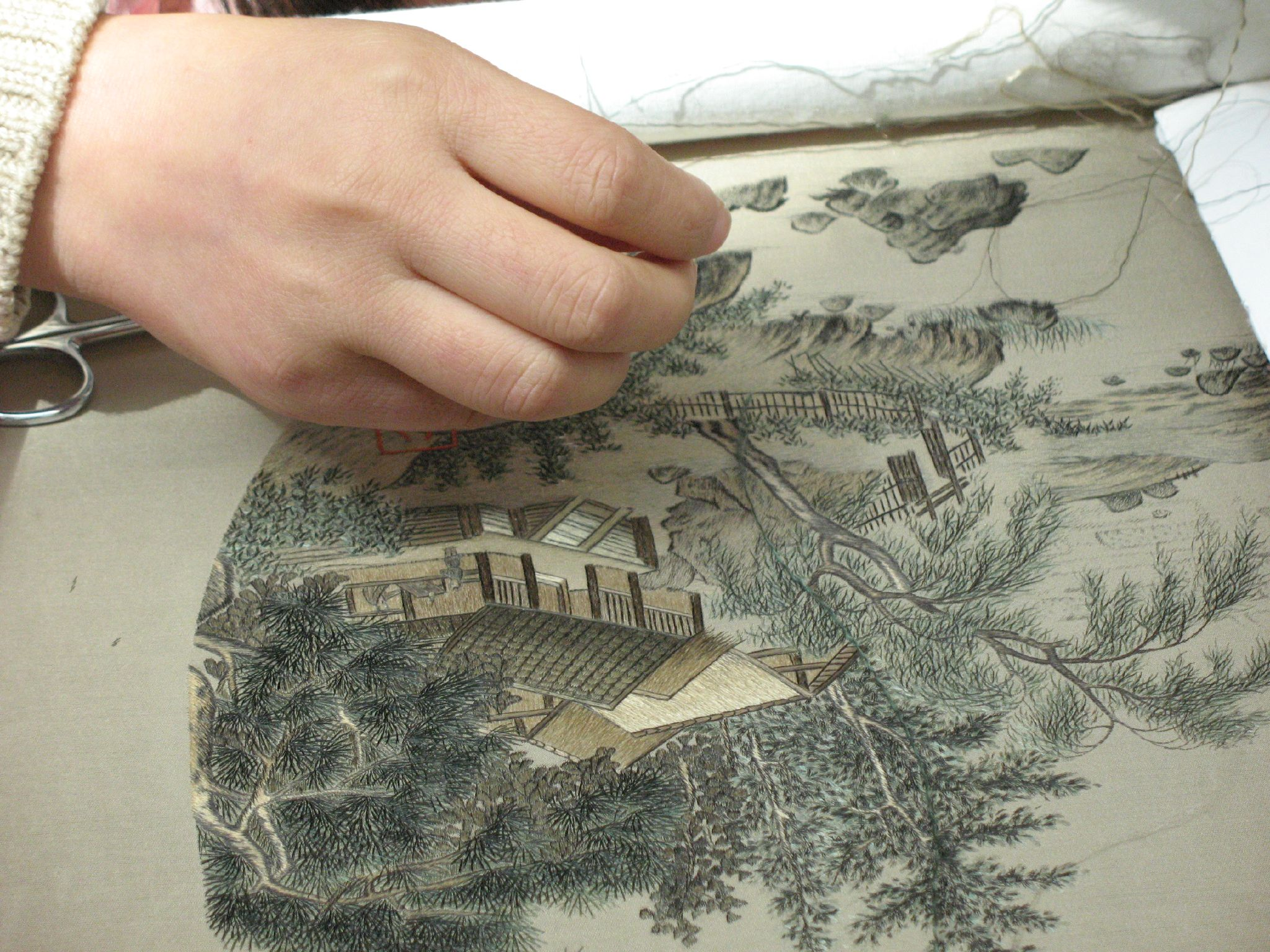
Gu embroidery being created.

- Gu Xiu (顾绣) – Gu embroidery is rather a family style than a local style originated from Gu Mingshi's family during the Ming Dynasty in Shanghai. Gu embroidery is also named Lu Xiang Yuan embroidery after the place where the Gu family lived. Gu embroidery is different from other styles as it specialized in painting and calligraphy. The inventor of Gu embroidery was a concubine of Gu Mingshi's first son, Gu Huihai. Later, Han Ximeng, the wife of the second grandson of Gu Mingshi developed the skill and was reputed as "Needle Saint" (针圣). Some of her masterpieces are kept in the Forbidden City. Today Gu embroidery has become a special local product in Shanghai.

=== Ethnic styles ===
Other Chinese ethnic groups, like Bai, Miao, Zhuang and Tibetan people also have their own style of embroidery, which usually depicts a mythical or religious topic.

== Common forms of stitches ==
- Pekin knot – a knotted stitch which originated in China
- Satin stitch – a common form of stitch used in Chinese embroidery

== See also ==
- History of silk
- Suzhou Silk Museum
- Chinese ornamental gold silk
- Chinese auspicious ornaments in textile and clothing
