= "Five stars rising in the East" armband =

Historic Sichuan brocade armband

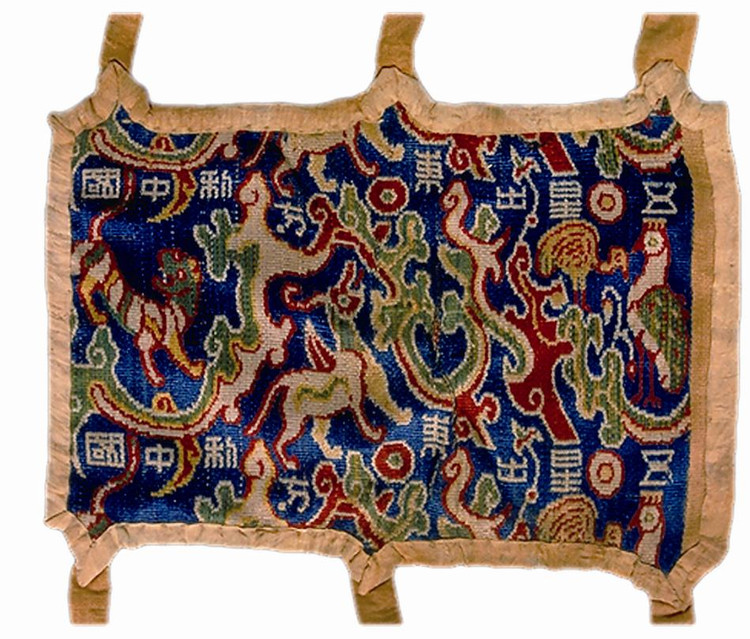
The brocade armband with the phrase "Simultaneous appearance of five stars in the eastern sky is a propitious sign for the 'Middle Kingdom'", displayed at the Xinjiang Institute of Archeology.

The "Five stars rising in the East" armband (Chinese: 「五星出東方利中國」護膊) is an Eastern Han (25–220 AD) to Western Jin (265–316 AD) era Sichuan brocade armband embroidered with the phrase "𠄡星出東方利中國" (Wǔ xīng chū dōngfāng lì Zhōngguó), meaning "simultaneous appearance of five stars in the eastern sky is a propitious sign for the 'Middle Kingdom'", or "Five stars rising in the East, being a propitious sign for the Middle Kingdom". Another cloth of the same pattern was found later and has the words "put down South Qiang" (討南羌 Tǎo Nán Qiāng). In 2002, they were designated one of the cultural relics forbidden to be exhibited abroad.

== Discovery ==
The pieces were unearthed in October 1995 at the Niya ruins in Xinjiang by an archaeological team made up of Chinese and Japanese scholars. It was found near the elbow/waist area of a corpse in a rich tomb.

== Interpretation ==
The phrase "Five stars rising in the East, being a propitious sign for the Middle Kingdom" (五星出東方利中國) resembles a similar phrase found in the Records of the Grand Historian's scroll 27 (五星分天之中，積於東方，中國利). In the ancient times the "five stars" (the classical planets) were represented as Chenxing (辰星), Taibai (太白), Yinghuo (熒惑), Suixing (歲星) and Zhenxing (鎭星). In modern times these are Mercury, Venus, Mars, Jupiter, Saturn, respectively. These are also represented by "Five Elements" with water, metal, earth, fire, wood.

The phrase "put down South Qiang" (討南羌) refers to the area that was first mentioned in a sentence in the Western Han Essentials's (西漢會要) scroll 46 in relation to the four ancient commandery. The four are located in today's Dunhuang, Jiuquan, Zhangye and Wuwei, in the northwestern province of Gansu, respectively.

When the two pieces are combined, it forms the phrase "Five stars rising in the East, being a propitious sign for the Middle Kingdom to put down South Qiang" (五星出東方利中國討南羌), though the meaning is up for debate.
