= Cantonese embroidery =

Style of embroidery folk art of the Pearl River Delta region

Yue embroidery (Chinese: 粵繡; Jyutping: Jyut6 sau3), or Guangdong embroidery, is a style of embroidery folk art of the Chaoshan and Pearl River Delta region. It encompasses Guangzhou embroidery (广绣) and Chaozhou embroidery (潮绣). It is one of the well-known "four great embroideries of China", the other three being Sichuan embroidery, Suzhou embroidery and Xiang embroidery.

Yue embroidery is highly regarded for its full composition, vivid images, bright colors, multiple embroidery techniques, smoothness, and evenness. This style usually use nature or auspicious symbols as the subject matters. Located in a subtropical region with plenty of sunshine and rainfall, Cantonese and Teochew have had access to a diverse set of flora and fauna, resulting in nature being an important source of inspiration for Yue embroidery's aesthetics. Yue embroidery can be further divided into four styles: woolen needlepoint tapestry, bead embroidery, machine embroidery and "Ding Gum Sau" (the use of silver and gold threads). Yue embroidery can be founded on various objects: hanging screen, clothes, shoes, etc.

Among the motifs commonly used in Cantonese embroidery (especially Guang embroidery), the “Hundred Birds” is a favorite, along with flowers, fruits, dragons and phoenixes, fish, landscapes, scenery, and figures. Notably, lychees, red kapok, and the “Three Birds” (chicken, goose, and duck) are prominent examples.

== See also ==
- Cantonese culture
- Teochew culture
