= Suzhou Silk Museum =

Museum in Suzhou, Jiangsu, China

Coordinates: 31°19′32″N 120°36′51″E

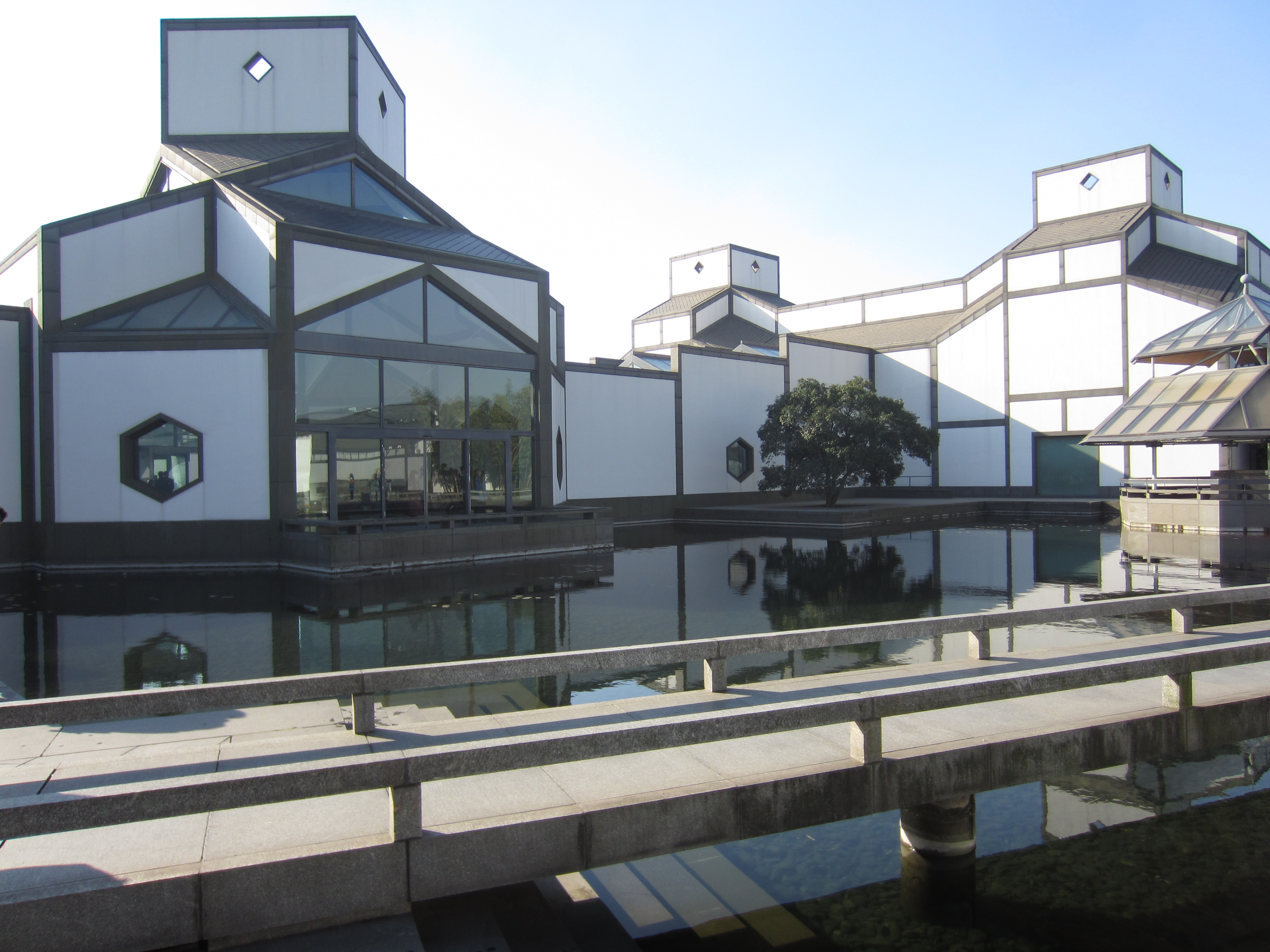
An exterior view of the Suzhou Silk Museum in China

The Suzhou Silk Museum is a museum in Suzhou, China. Established in 1991, it documents the history of silk production and Suzhou embroidery from around 2000 BC. Exhibits include old looms with demonstrations, samples of ancient silk patterns, and an explanation of sericulture. Of major note was a room full of live silk worms, eating mulberry leaves and spinning cocoons. By December 2009, the live silkworms had been replaced with models.
