= Sichuan Textiles =

Style of textile folk art native to Sichuan and Chongqing

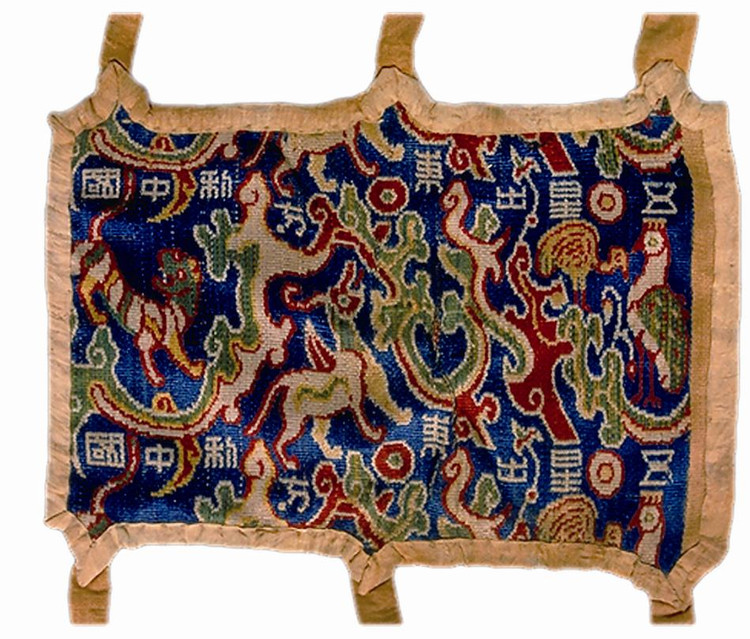
"Five stars rising in the East" armband, a 3rd-century Sichuan brocade armband discovered at Niya ruins in Xinjiang (also known as Chinese Turkestan); displayed at Xinjiang Institute of Archeology.

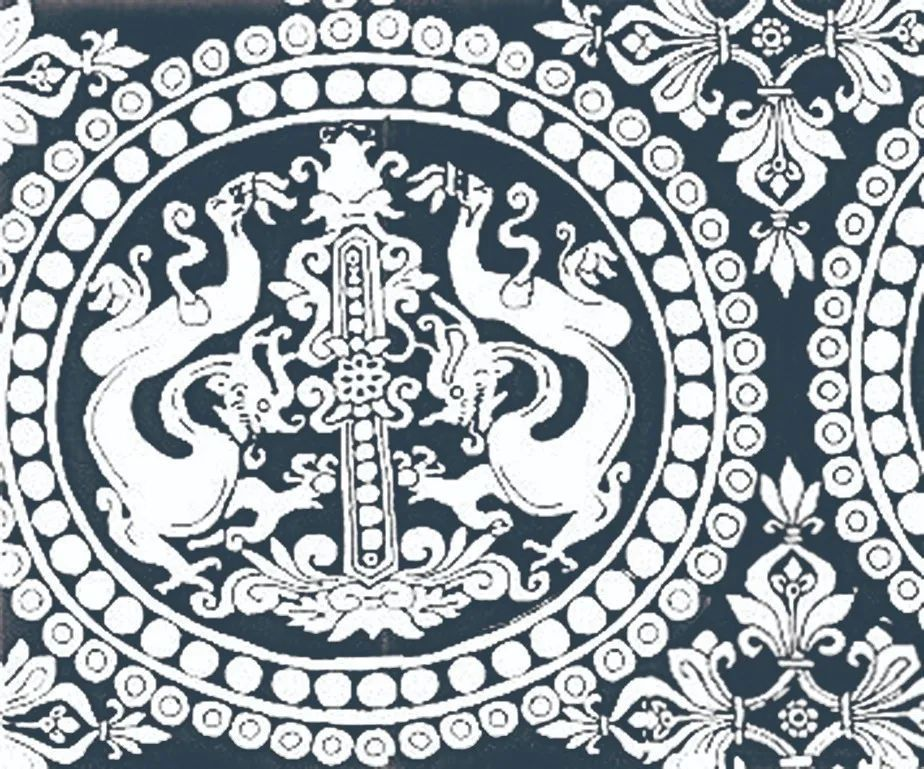
Double dragon within pearl roundels, manufactured in Shuangliu between 7th and early 10th century, unearthed in 1959 from Tomb 221 at Astana Cemetery in Turpan, Xinjiang.

Sichuan Textiles (traditional Chinese: 川繡; simplified Chinese: 川绣; pinyin: Chuān Xiù) consist of several different fiber art techniques. The Sichuan region is especially renowned for its woven fabrics, especially a brocade known as Shu brocade (蜀錦; 蜀锦; Shǔ Jǐn). Sichuan brocade originates from Chengdu, the capital of Sichuan, during the time of the ancient Kingdom of Shu (c. 1046 BC?–c. 316 BC). An excavation of four tombs dating back to the Western Han dynasty (202 BC – 8 AD), on Mount Laoguan located in Tianhui Town, Chengdu, has confirmed the use of patterning looms for weaving warp-faced compounds in that period. Sichuan embroidery or Shu embroidery (蜀繡; 蜀绣; Shǔ Xiù; Shu-Hsiu), is a style of embroidery folk art native to Sichuan and Chongqing.

Sichuan embroidery is one of the so-called "four great embroideries of China" along with Cantonese embroidery, Suzhou embroidery and Xiang embroidery.

== Materials and Style ==
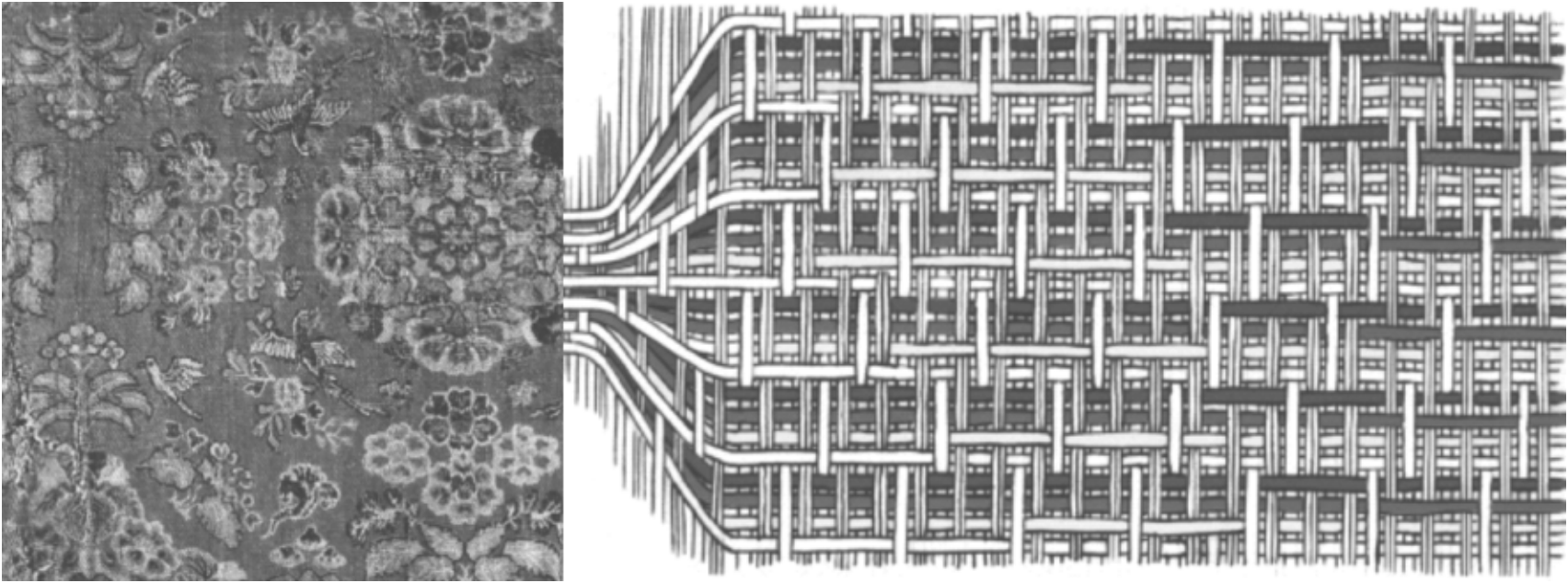
A twill brocade and its fabric weave structure, 7th–10th century.

Sichuan textile art is based on the use of silk. The designs often featured animals, flowers, leaves, mountains, rivers, trees and human figures. These silk products were a combination of fine art and practical use, as it is used to decorate pillow cases, shoes, quilt covers, garments, and folding screens.

== Brocades ==
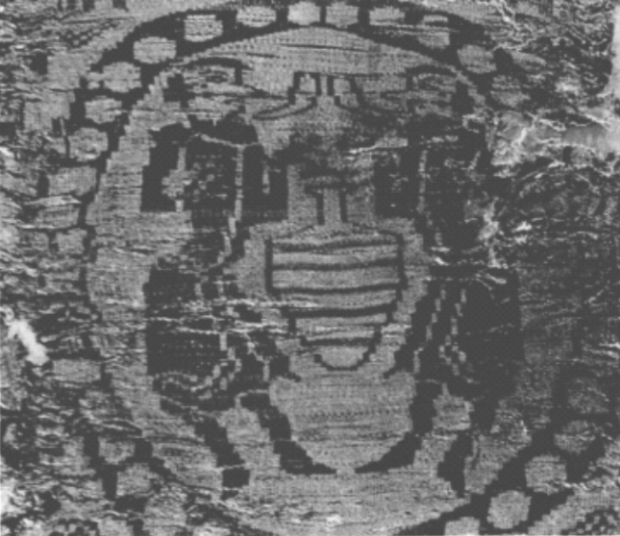
Drinking scene involving two Byzantines or Central Asians within a pearl roundel, unearthed in 1973 from Tomb 507 at Astana Cemetery in Turpan, Chinese Turkestan. 7th–early 10th century.

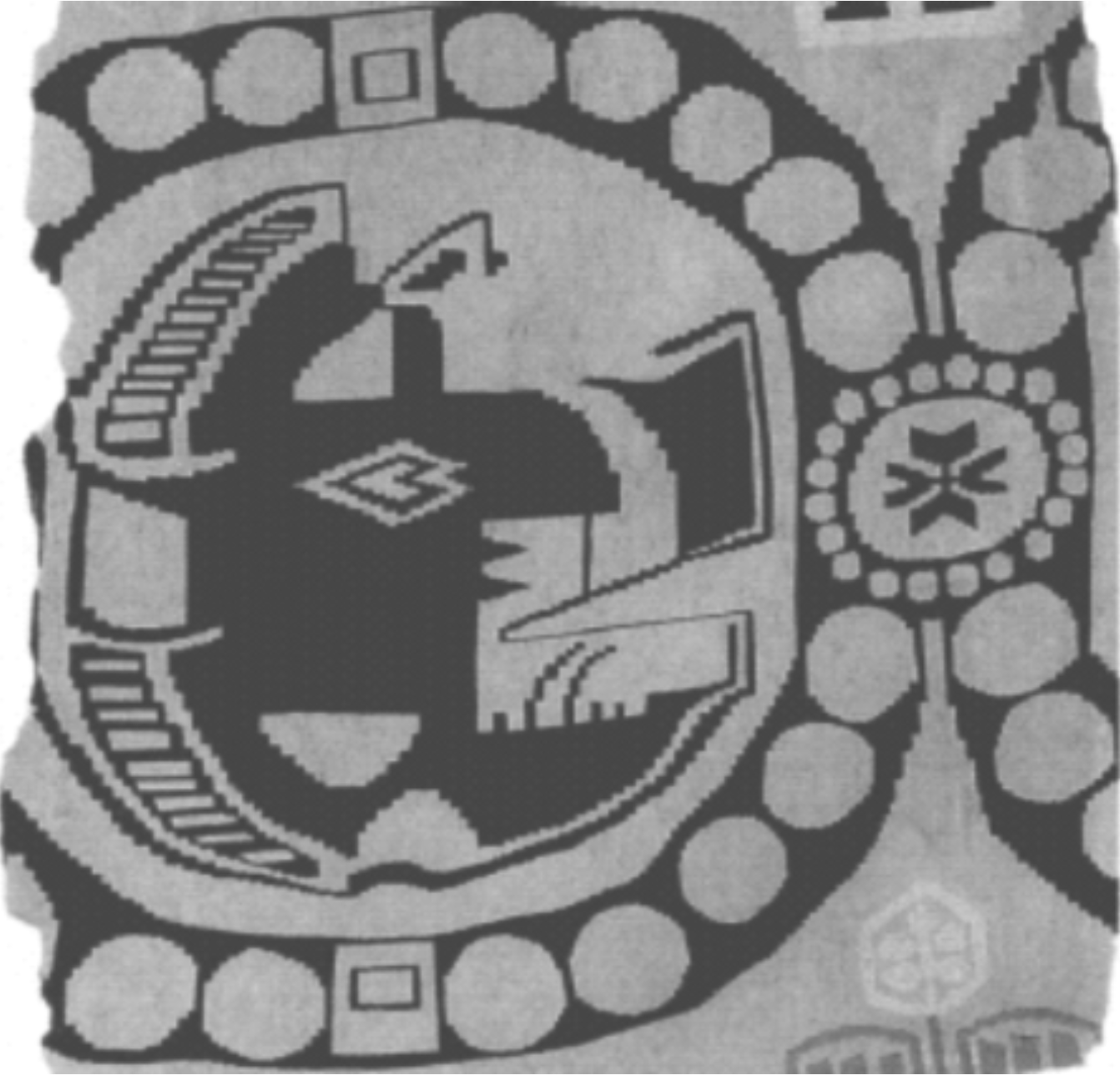
Boar head within a pearl roundel, unearthed in 1959 from Tomb 325 at Astana Cemetery. Great similarity between this textile motif and a boar head from a mural at Balalyk Tepe suggests a strong Central Asian influence.

Throughout its history, Sichuan brocades developed a quality of being smooth, bright, neat, and influenced by its own geographical environment, various customs and cultures, with significant foreign influences being Sasanian, Sogdian and Hellenistic during the 1st millennium.

The Sui and Tang dynasties (581–907) saw the golden age of Sichuan textile art, when it enjoyed high popularity throughout the regions immediately to the west of China (Chinese Turkestan), Central Asia and Western Asia. Novel themes and patterns from these regions were incorporated into embroidery designs during this period. In the Book of Sui, it is recorded that in the year 605, the head of the Sichuan ateliers producing silks in the "western style" was a certain He Chou (何稠), a name which betrays his Sogdian origins. A classification of various types of Sichuan brocade is found in Dunhuang manuscripts preserved in the Bibliothèque nationale de France.

== Gallery of Brocades ==
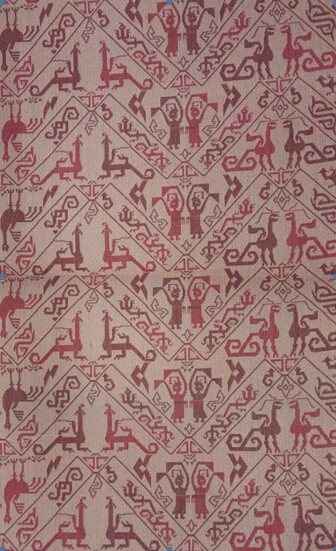
Animals and dancing human figures, late period of the Ancient Kingdom of Shu, coinciding with the Warring States period (c. 475–221 BC).

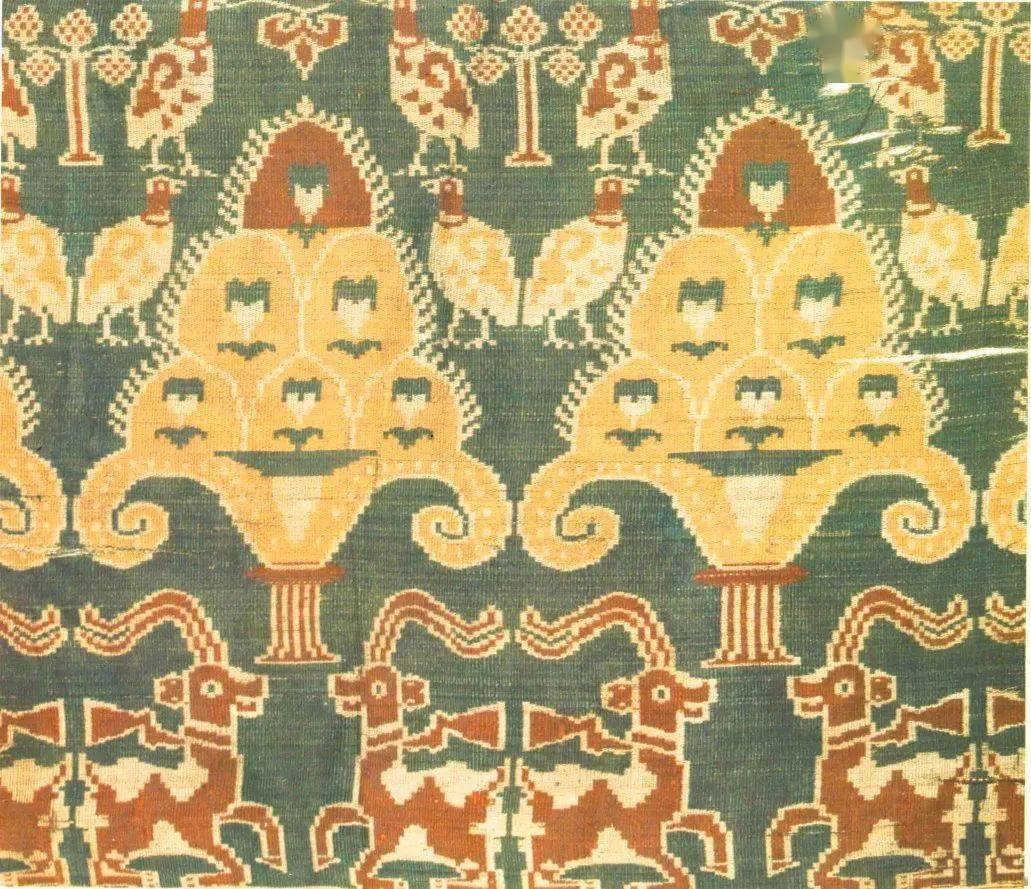
Animals and trees, unearthed at Astana Cemetery in Turpan, Chinese Turkestan; 5th–6th century.

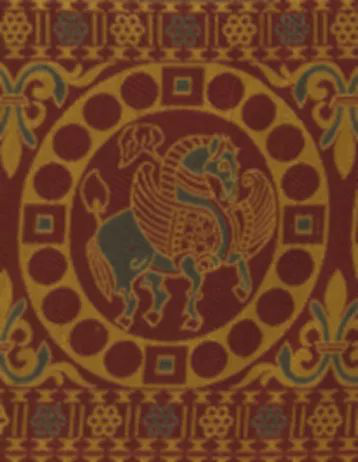
Winged horse within a pearl roundel, 7th–10th century.

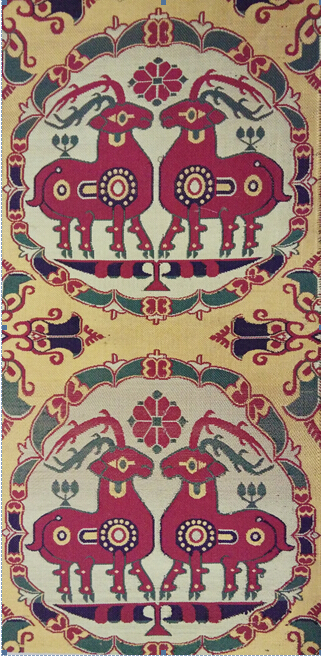
Double-deer-within-floral-roundel pattern, 7th–10th century.

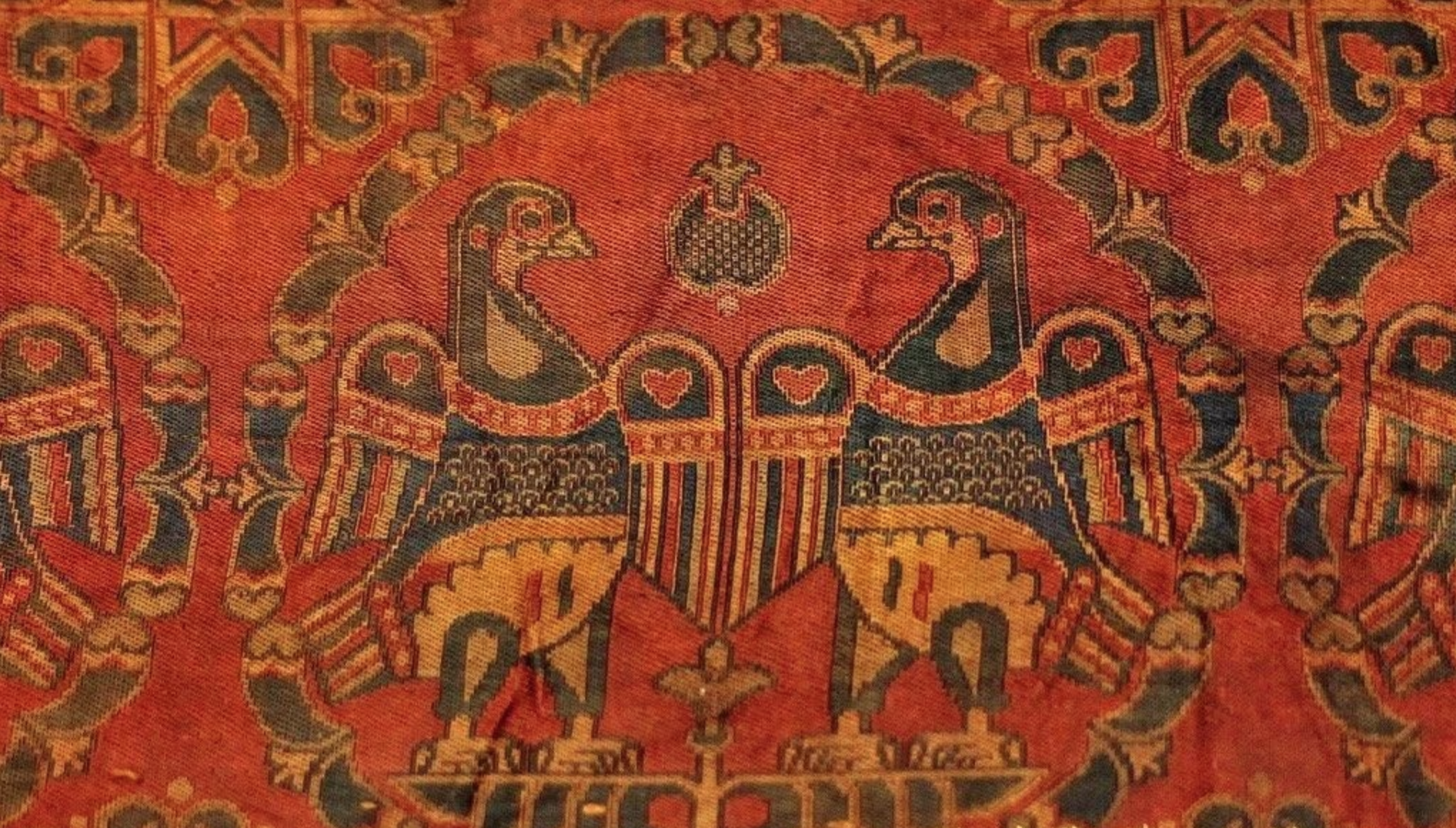
Double bird within a floral roundel, collection of Chengdu Museum, 7th–10th century.

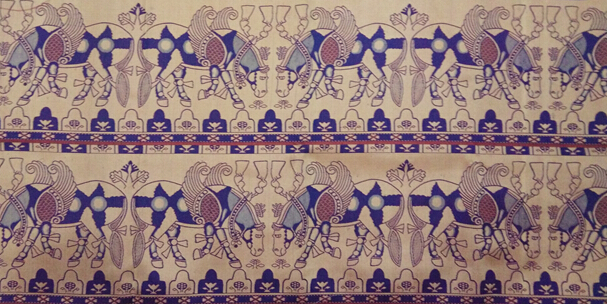
Winged horse pattern, 7th–10th century.

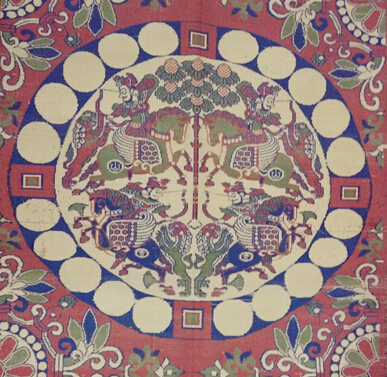
Sasanian horsemen hunting scene within a pearl roundel, 7th–10th century.

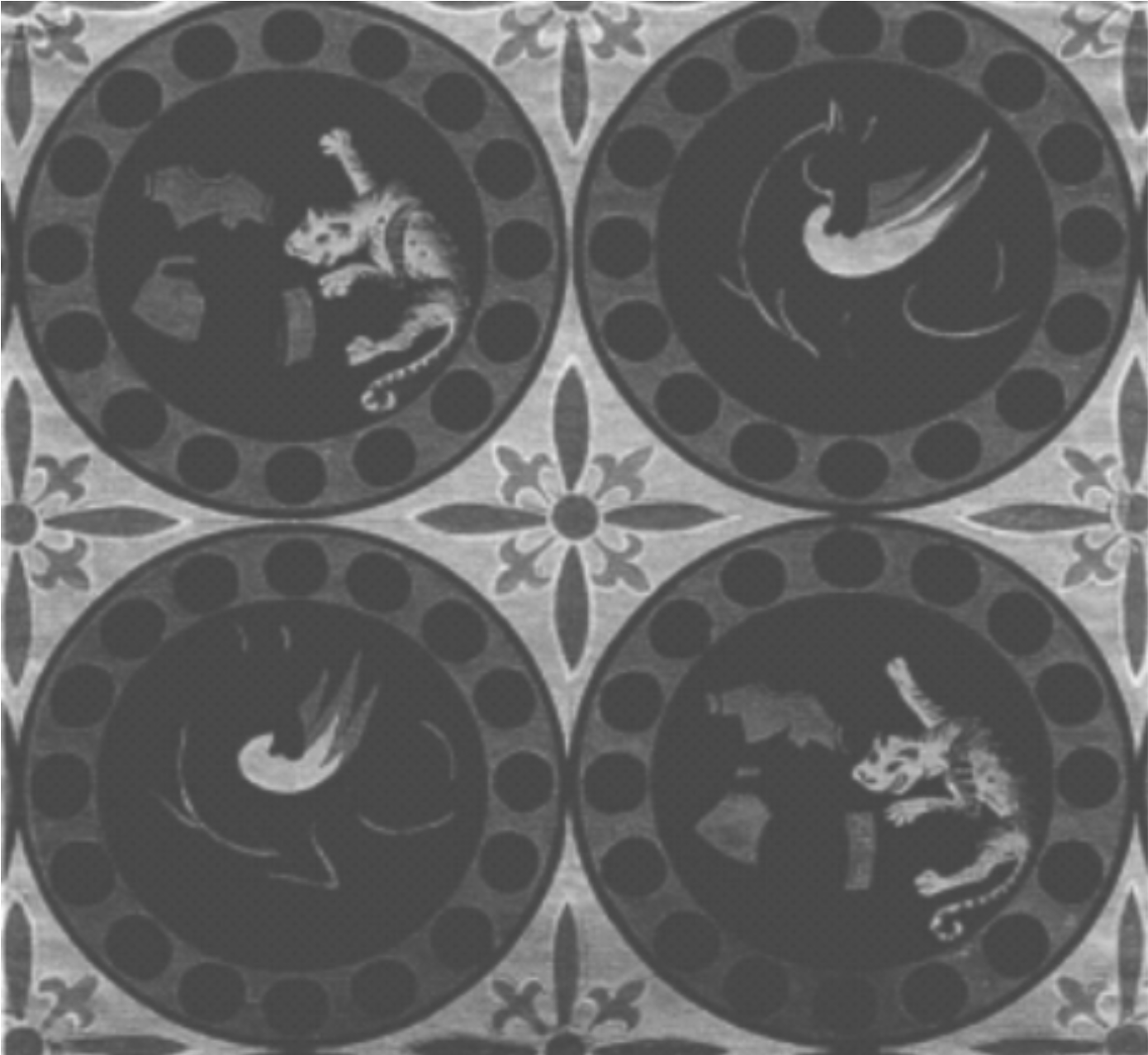
Winged horses and hunting scenes within pearl roundels

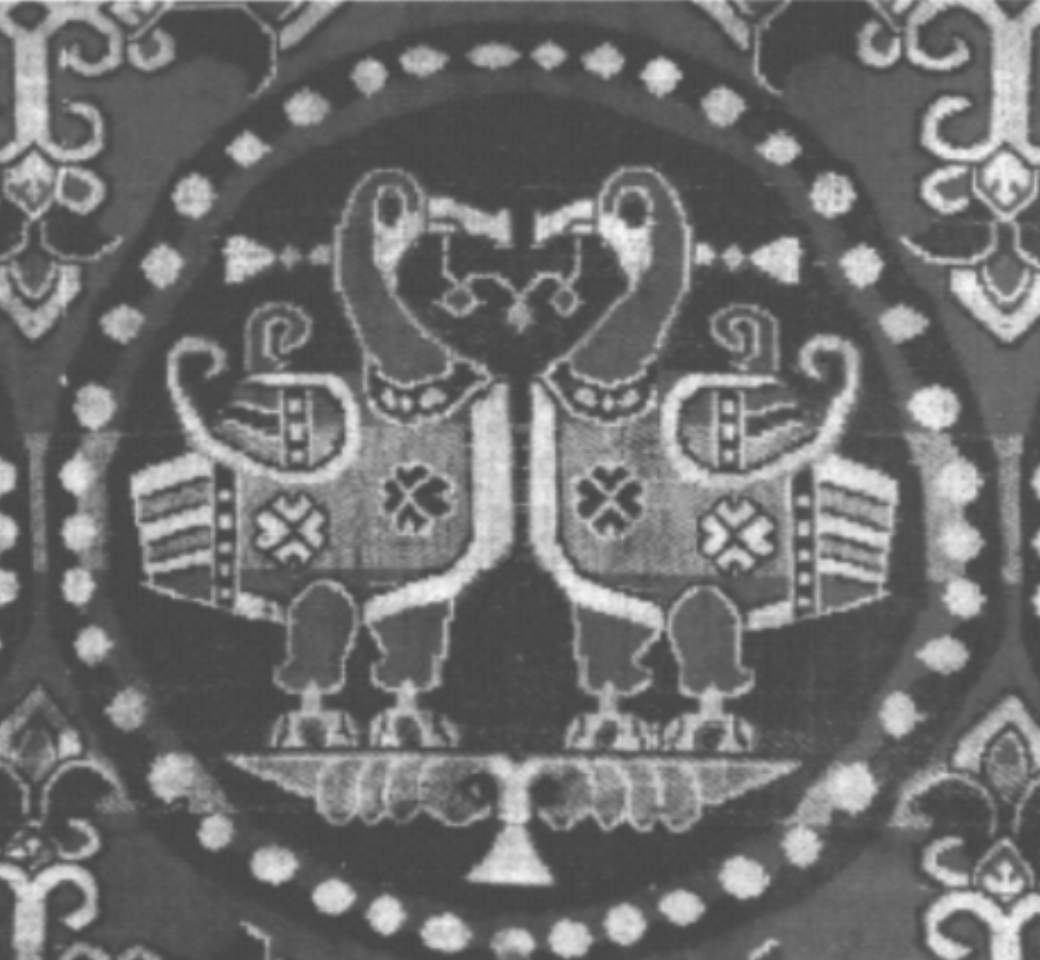
Double goose within a pearl roundel, 7th–10th century.

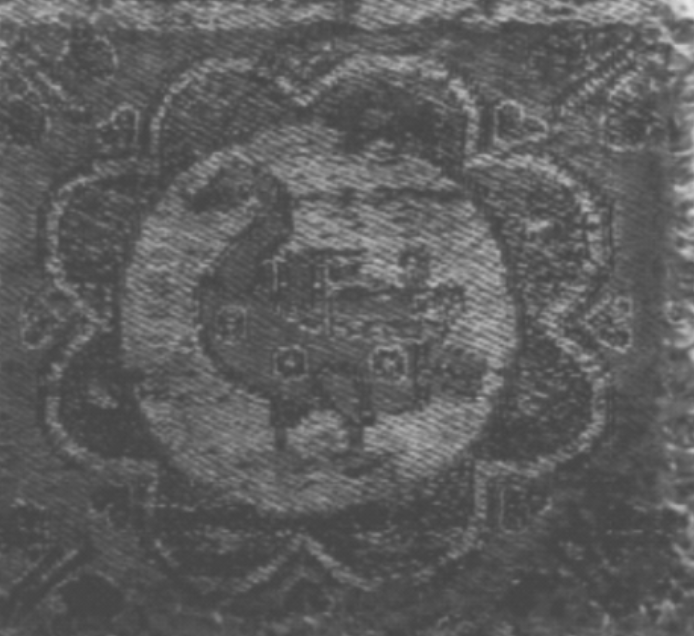
Standing goose within an eight-petalled flower, 7th–10th century.

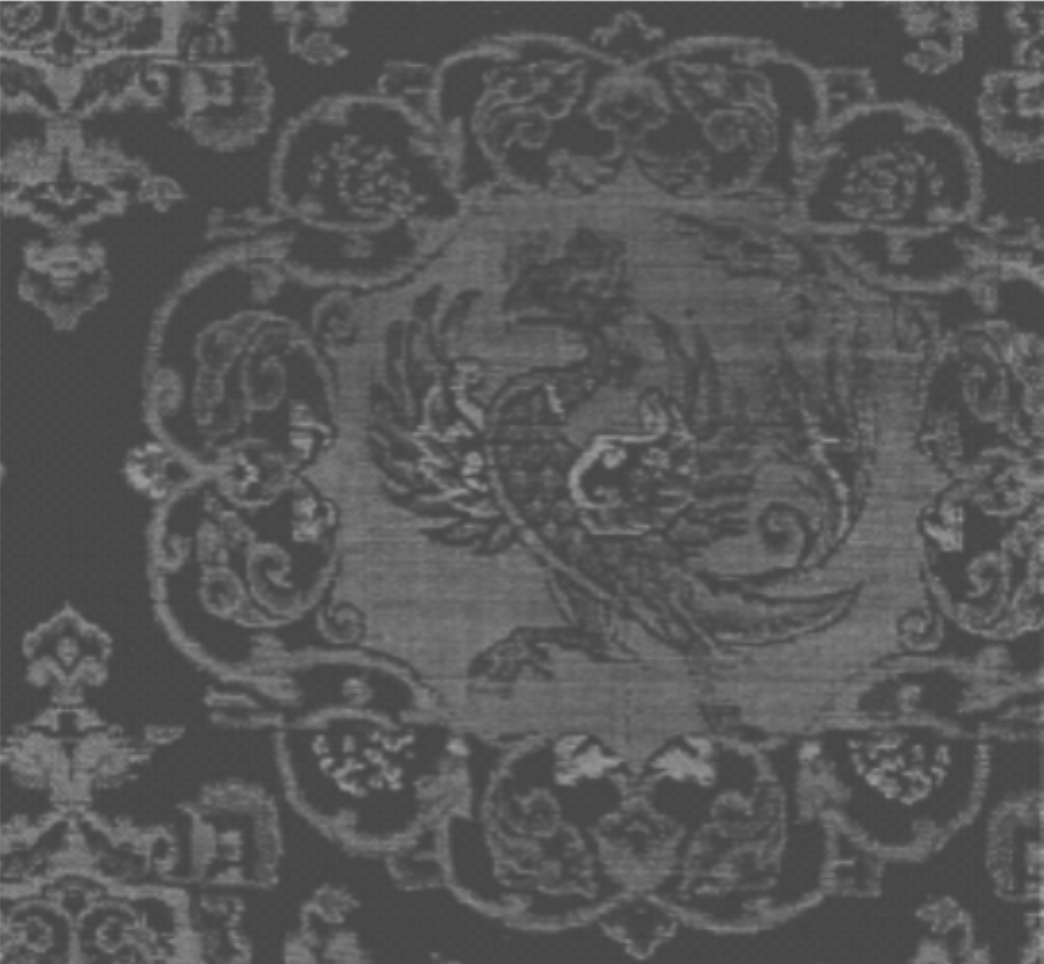
Dancing phoenix within a floral roundel, 7th–10th century.

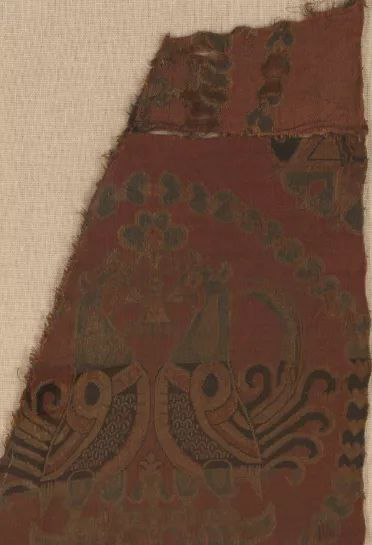
Fragment with the so-called "ribbon-bearing bird" pattern, 7th–10th century.

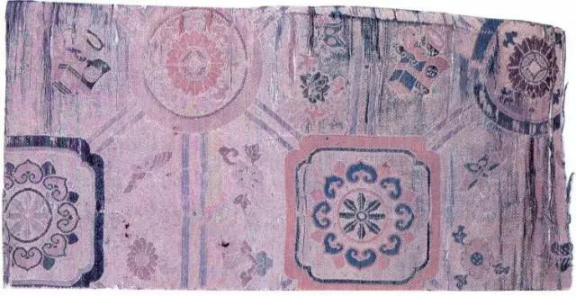
Sichuan brocade fragment manufactured between the late 10th and late 13th century.

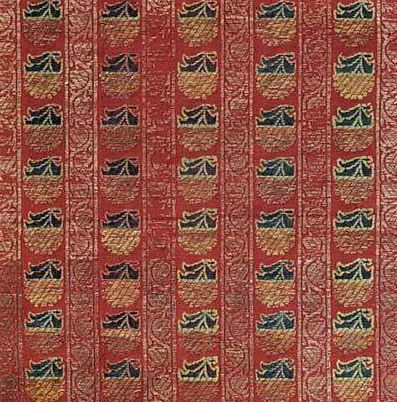
Sichuan brocade manufactured between the late 13th and late 14th century.

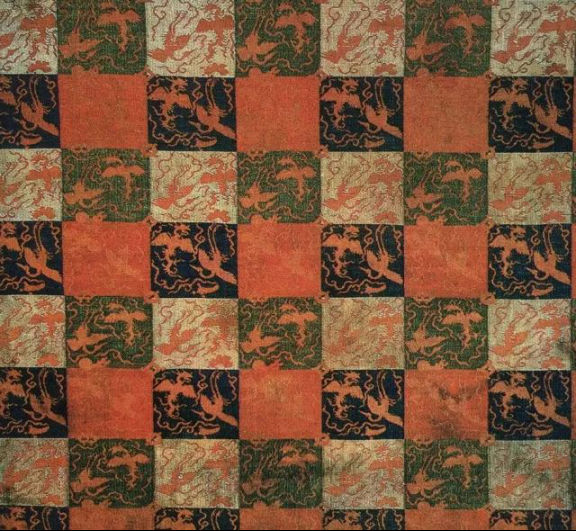
Sichuan brocade manufactured in the late 19th century.

== See also ==
- Ba–Shu culture
- Byzantine silk
- Coptic textiles
- Clothing in ancient Shu
- Embroidery of India
- Persian embroidery
- Samite
- Sampul tapestry
- Sogdian textiles
- Tibetan rug
