= Knotted stitch =

Embroidery technique

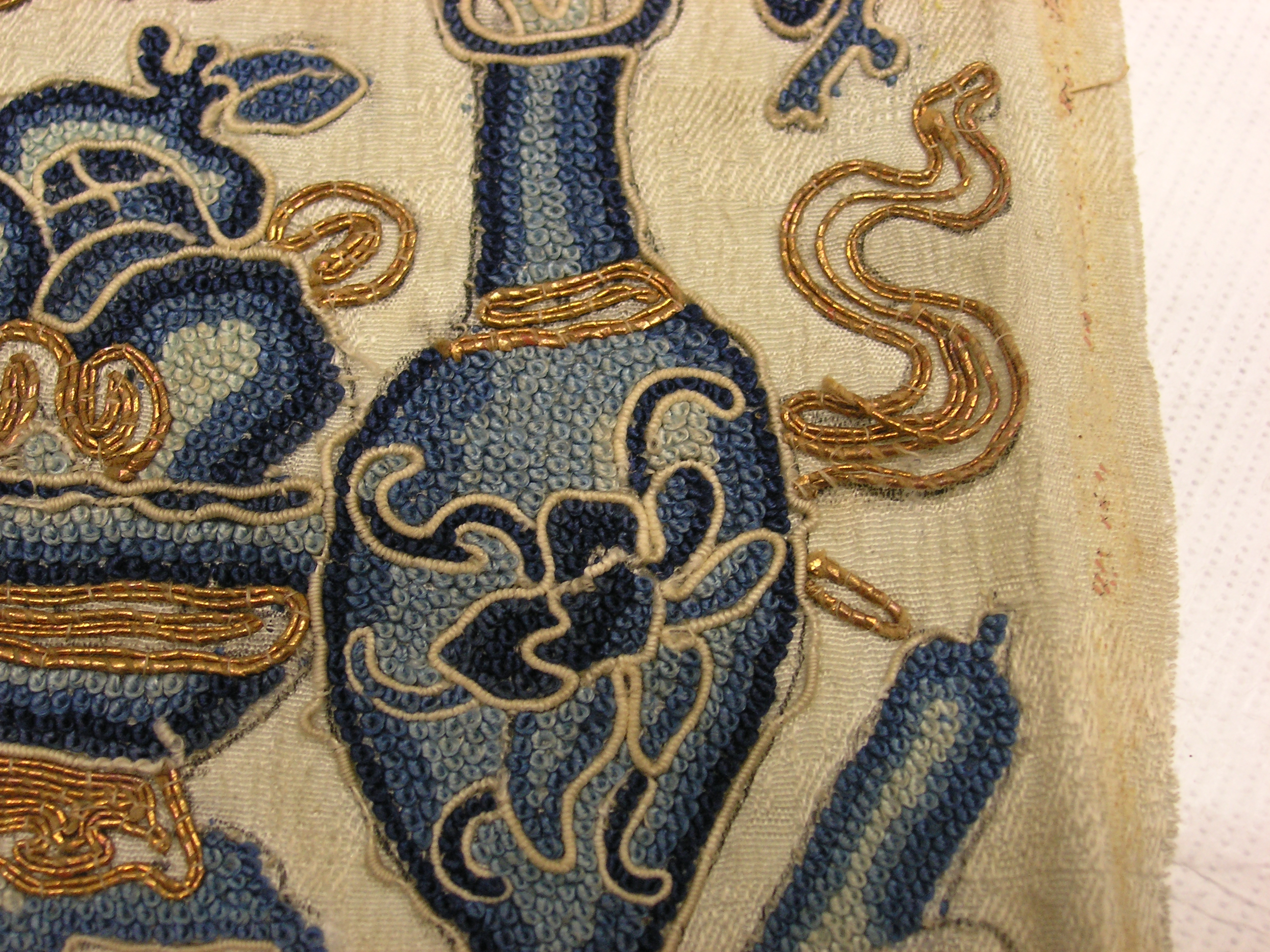
Vases in Pekin stitch, Qing dynasty (1644–1912), China

A knotted stitch, also known as knot stitch, is any embroidery technique in which the yarn or thread is knotted around itself. A knotted stitch is a type of decorative embroidery stitches which form three-dimensional knots on the surface of a textile. Common knotted stitches include French knots, coral stitch, and Pekin knot (also known as forbidden stitch, Pekin stitch, and seed stitch) which is sometimes also referred as French knot although there is a difference in techniques between these two stitches. Knotted stitches can be subdivided into individual or detached knots, continuous knotted stitches, and knotted edgings.

== History ==
Knotted embroidery originated in ancient China; the oldest example of it dates from the Warring States period in the form a pair of silk shoes. Knotted embroidery was popular in the Han dynasty and fine silk clothing were embellished with the Pekin knot in this period. Knotted embroidery were also used on the mandarin square of the Ming and Qing court clothing of officials. The Pekin knot is one of the two main types of Chinese embroidery stitches, with the other being the satin stitch.

Embroideries tradition which started in China were passed to other countries through the Silk Road.

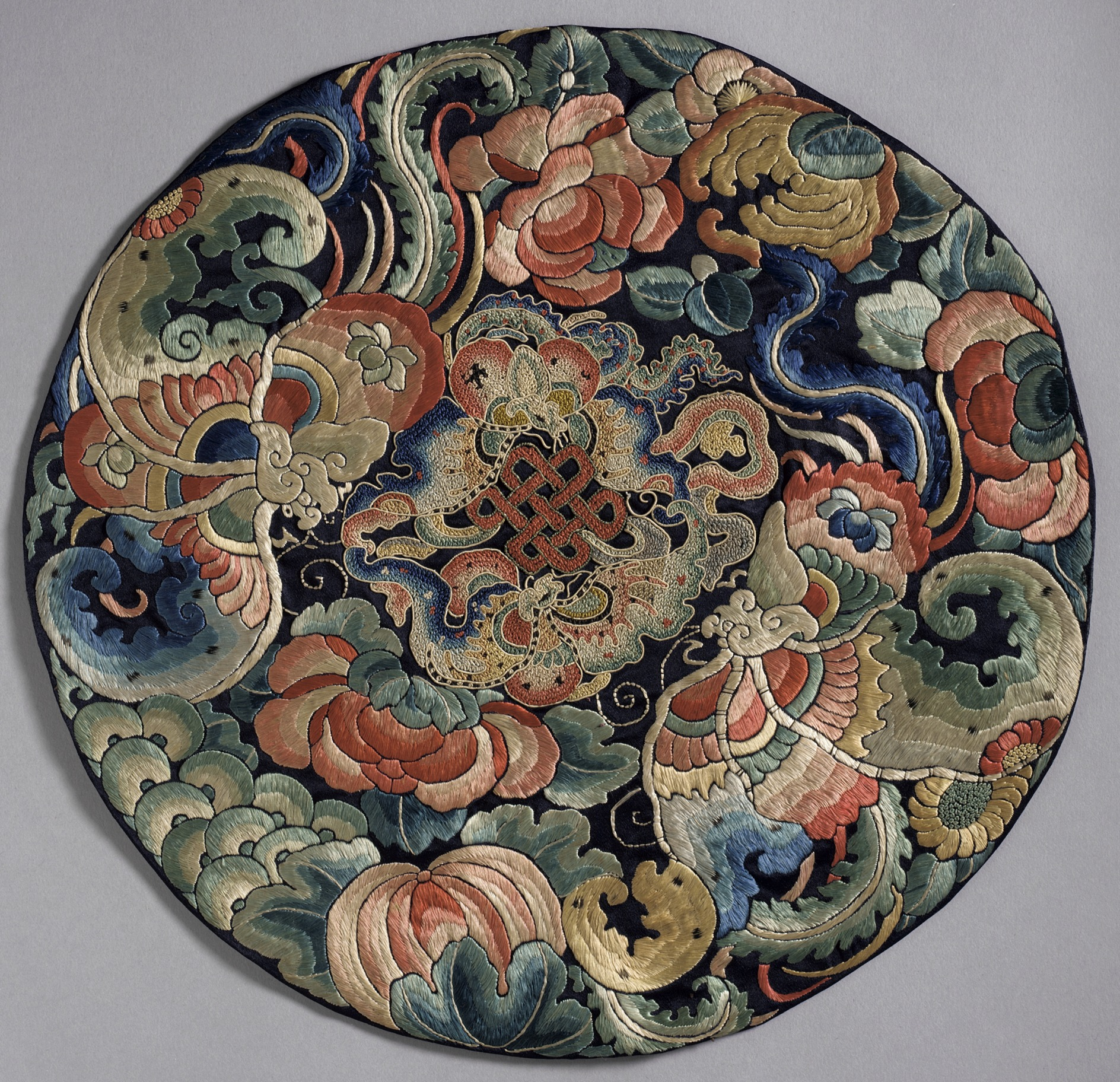
Roundels in Peking knot and satin stitch, Qing dynasty.

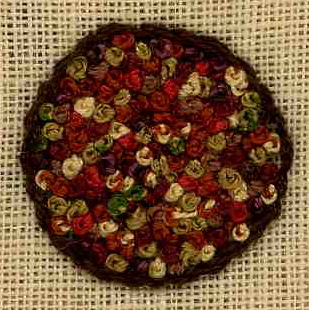
Contemporary design of French knots surrounded by chain stitch from a sampler in the form of a challah cover.

Embroideries from China and Western Asia were imported to the British Isles, North America and Western Europe by the British East India Company in the 1690s along with many other traded goods. Eastern knotted embroidery became popular among Westerners. The liking for the Pekin knot eventually influenced the development of tatting in Western Europe and the British Isles when Europeans sought the knotted effects of the stitches but did not want the time-consuming process of stitching tightly packed little knots continuously for long hours.

== Applications ==
Individual knots are often found used as detached filling stitches.

Knotted edgings are used as a decorative trims, and can also be used to fill open spaces in cutwork and in needlelace.

== Detached knots ==
French knot

Individual knots include:

- French knot
- Bullion knot
- Four-legged knot stitch
- Turk's head knot

=== Knot gallery ===
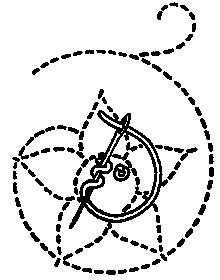
French knots

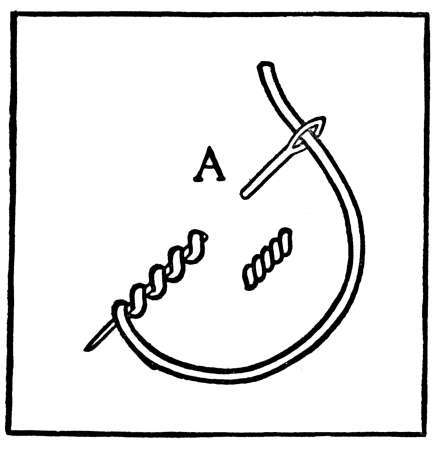
Bullion knot

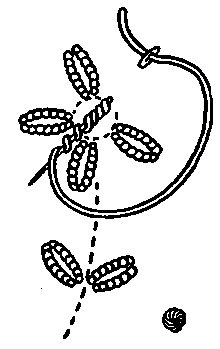
Bullion knots

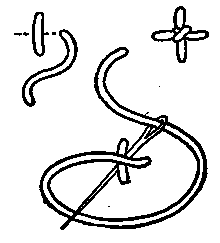
Four-legged knot stitch

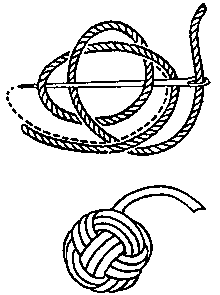
Turk's head knot

== Continuous stitches ==
Knotted stitches include:

- Ceylon stitch
- Coral stitch or coral knots
- Zig-zag coral stitch
- Double knot stitch or Smyrna stitch
- Knotted cable chain stitch, a knotted variant of cable chain stitch

=== Stitch gallery ===
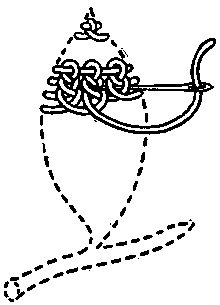
Ceylon stitch

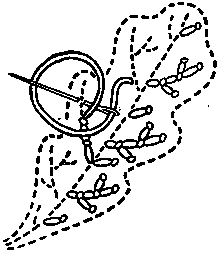
Coral stitch

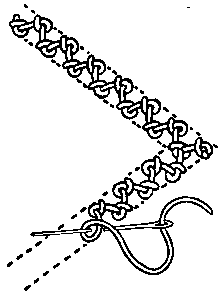
Zig-zag coral stitch

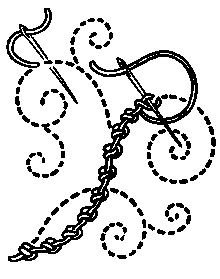
Double knot stitch

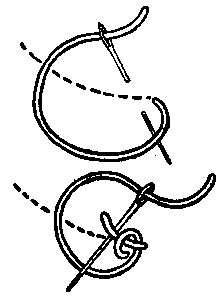
Double knot variation

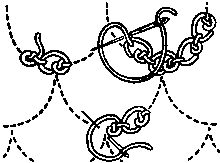
Knotted cable chain stitch

== Knotted edgings ==
Knotted edgings include:

- Antwerp edging
- Armenian edging
- Hollie stitch

== See also ==
- Cross-stitch
- Embroidery stitch
- Tufting
