= Suzhou embroidery =

Embroidery created near Suzhou, China

Su xiu (蘇繡)
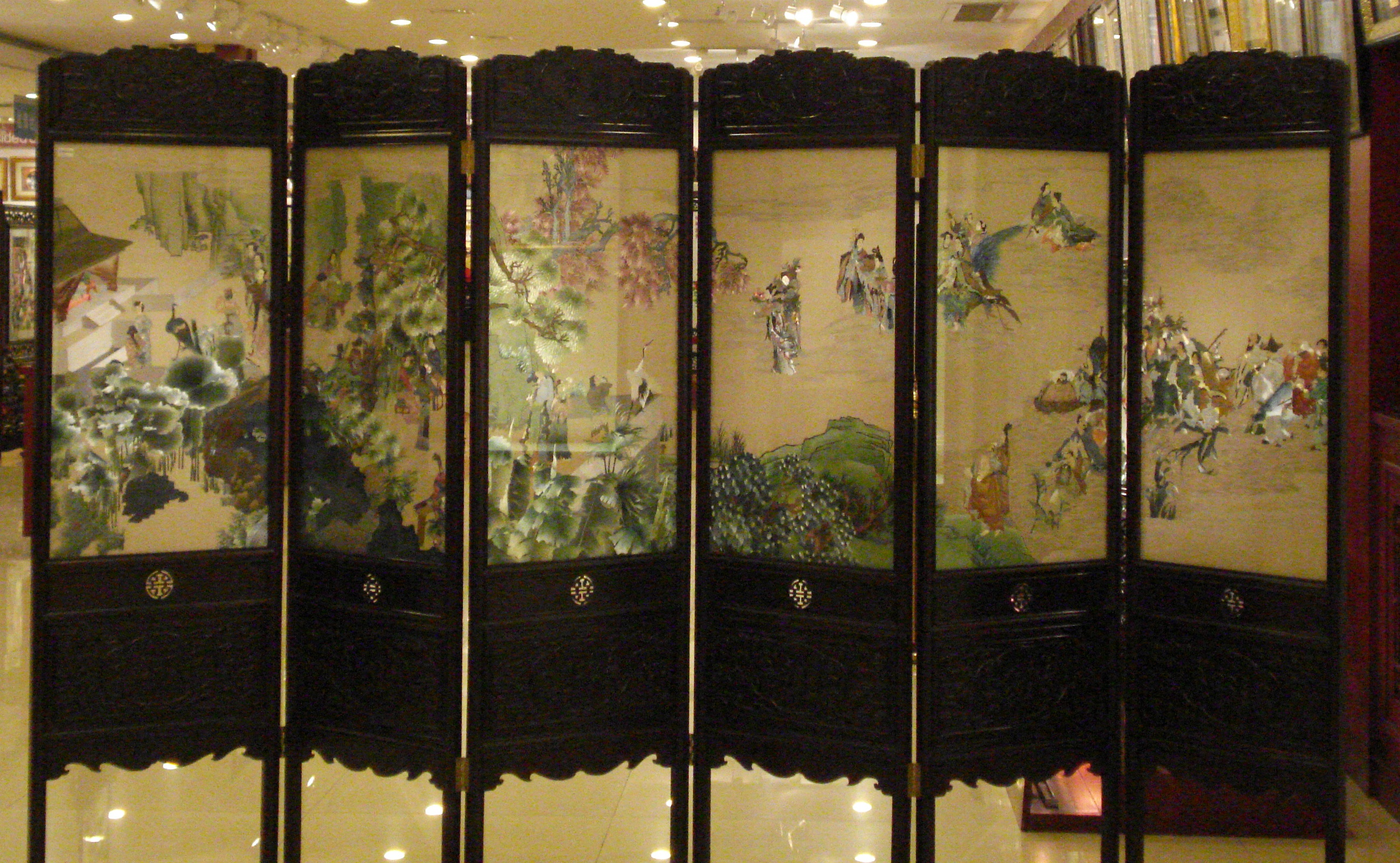
- Su embroidery used as decoration on furniture
- Traditional Chinese: 蘇繡
- Simplified Chinese: 苏绣
- Literal meaning: "Suzhou embroidery", "Su embroidery"
Transcriptions
Standard Mandarin
- Hanyu Pinyin: Sū xiù
- Wade–Giles: Su hsiu

Suzhou embroidery, Su embroidery or Su xiu (simplified Chinese: 苏绣; traditional Chinese: 蘇繡) is the embroidery created around the city of Suzhou, Jiangsu, China. It is one of the oldest embroidery techniques in the world and is the most representative type of art in Chinese embroidery. One of the well-known "four great embroideries of China" along with Cantonese embroidery, Sichuan embroidery and Xiang embroidery, Suzhou embroidery already has a history more than 2,000 years and is an important form of handicraft in the history of Chinese art and folk custom, representative of Chinese traditional folk arts. It is famous for its variety of stitches, beautiful patterns, elegant colors, and consummate craftsmanship.

== History ==
Su Xiu originated in Suzhou, Jiangsu Province. Because of its superior geographical environment, Suzhou is a city which is rich in producing silk. This provides a favorable environment for the development of Su Xiu.

Suzhou embroidery has a history of more than two thousand years. It was recorded as early as the era of Three Kingdoms.

In Three Kingdoms era (220–280 A.D.), Su Xiu was used as a decoration for clothing. It gradually moved into people's lives.

During the Song dynasty (960–1697 A.D.), Su embroidery reached a high level.

During the Ming dynasty (1368–1644 A.D.), Suzhou embroidery became a popular avocation for people living in Suzhou. At that time, almost every family was doing embroidery. Not only that, an imperial office was founded to oversee dyeing, weaving and embroidering for court use. At that time, Su Xiu was not only an object for family use, but also loved by the royals.

During the ensuing Qing dynasty (1644–1912 A.D.), Su Xiu reached its heyday. At that time, Suzhou had more than 100 embroidery workshops and markets. It was widely used to decorate clothing, costumes, quilts, pillow bags, curtains, cushions, shoes, sachets and other items. At that time, it was the most popular art form for royal clothing and wall decoration. Some ladies from affluent families made embroideries as a pastime. In the later part of the Qing dynasty, Su Xiu was further developed as an embroidery technology. Exquisite "Double-sided Embroidery" appeared.

In the early 20th century, between 1912 and 1949, after the Xinhai Revolution, the Su Xiu industry declined.

After the founding of new China (after 1949), the government showed great concern for Su Xiu. China set up the Suzhou embroidery institute and opened embroidery training classes. People made innovations to bring new life to the traditional skills. The embroidery method of Su Xiu developed from 18 kinds to more than 40 kinds.

== Characteristics ==
=== Subjects ===
The traditional subjects of Su Xiu embroidery reflect characters and nature environment include figures, animals, mountains, rivers, flowers and birds. Here are some classical Su embroidery works: "Lady Jiong Dances on a Golden Lotus Platform", a masterpiece made by a well-known Qing dynasty embroiderer called Ling Shu, it depicts imperial concubine Lady Jiong dancing for Emperor Li Yu of the Southern Tang dynasty. It is about the subject of figures. The “Golden Belt Apron” is Zhao Huijun's masterpiece. By using different stitching techniques, it shows us delicate peony flower. It is about the subject of animals. “Two Chickens under a Wisteria Branch", is generally recognized a masterpiece of the early 20th century. It shows two chickens under a wisteria tree.

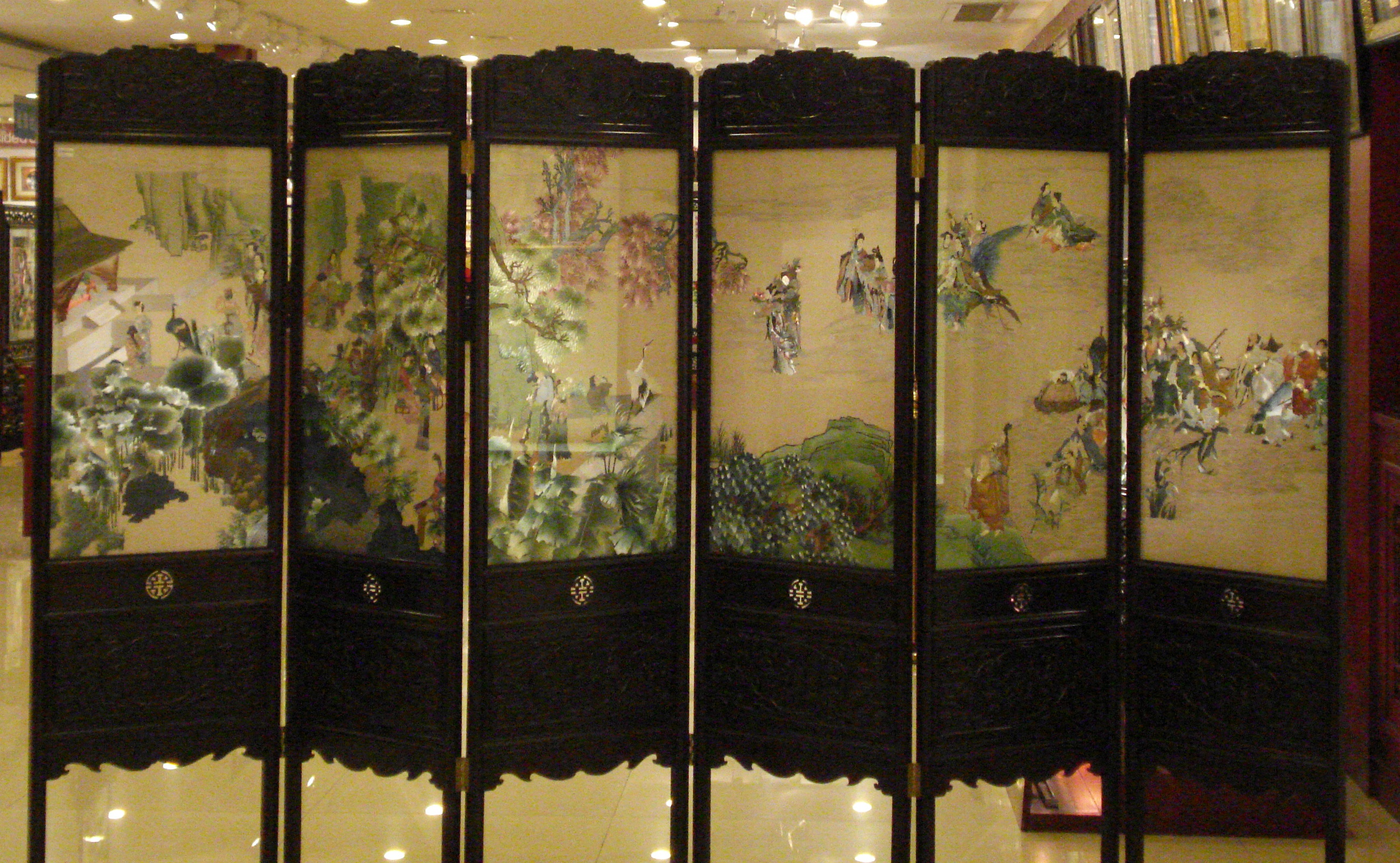
Su Xiu can be used as the decoration of furniture

=== Use ===
Suzhou embroidery is mainly used in costumes and for decorations around the home, adding both decorative and practical value. It could be used to as the decoration for shoes, pillow sides, purses. And can also be the mirror cover. The purse is a kind of pocket with embroidered pattern. In ancient China, it was embroidered by ladies as the tokens of pledging love for their lover. The patterns cover a very wide rage, animals, plants and figures. Ladies always use these patterns to express their good wishes. And was the most emotional expression of love at that time. The mirror cover is used to put woman's mirror in old times. It has many shapes such as circular, square and octagon.

=== Fabrication ===
First of all, the draft of the embroidery design should be prepared. It can be an original design or a copy of another work. It is popular to copy works selected from famous artists, including traditional Chinese paintings, oil paintings, photographs and so on.

Secondly, materials and tools should be prepared. The materials include: draft, silk and filament silk embroidery thread. Tools are: stretch frame, hand board, scissors, embroidery needle and tape measure.

Su embroidery has strict requirements for embroidery needles, and the thickness of the needles will affect the shades and the performance of the work. Embroiderers usually split a hair-thin silk thread into two to sixteen thinner threads. Different thread thicknesses are used for different parts of a subject in embroidery.

Third, start the embroidery. Su Xiu can be divided into two categories according to its appearance: single-sided embroidery and double-sided embroidery. Single-sided embroidery has a front side and a back side of the fabric, and the design is only displayed on the front side. Double-sided embroidery means the finished product looks exactly the same on both sides of the fabric. The method of making this embroidery is very complicated. All thread ends are skillfully concealed between layers of stitch work. The embroidery process is finished without a second time. As a result, no knots or thread ends are visible in a double sided embroidery. According to different stitches, Su Xiu can be divided into random needlework and plain needlework. Random needlework, as the name implies is the needlework which has a very stochastic embroidery method. Embroidered with this kind of needlework usually consist of straight and oblique lines, cross and mixed together, and then go through another layer of mixed colours and density until light, colour and shape are similar.

The final step is to frame the finished piece. Frames usually are made by annatto wood, Millettia wood and rosewood.

It usually takes three to five months to complete a small piece of embroidery, one year for a medium-size piece and two or three years for a large one.

== Traditional patterns ==
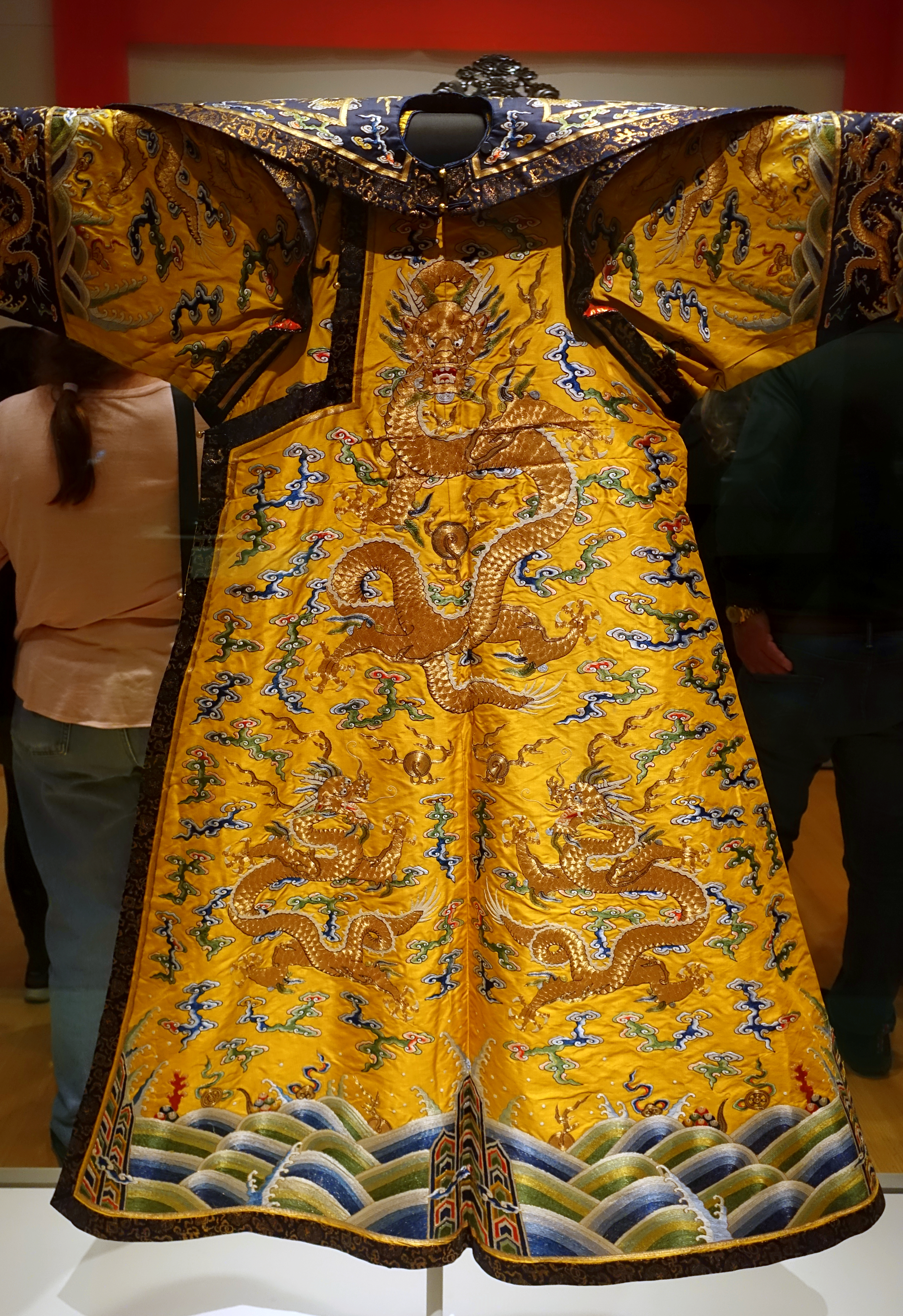
Clothes with dragon of ancient Chinese emperors

Dragon

Dragon

Dragon worship has a long history in China. In ancient times, the dragon was a symbol of power. Only the emperor could wear yellow clothes embroidered with dragons. Now, "The descendants of the dragon" is a symbol of the Chinese nation.

Phoenix

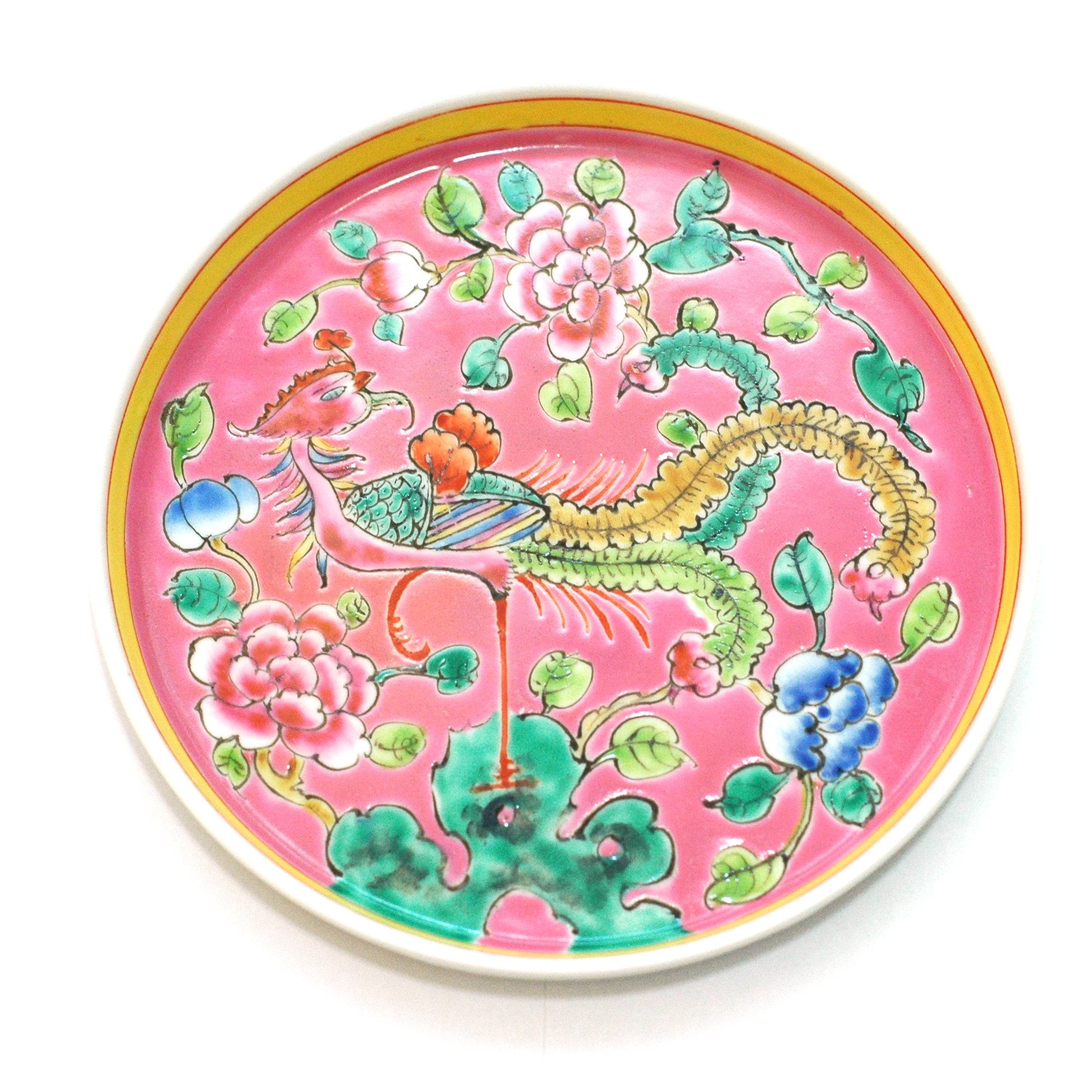
Phoenix

Phoenix is a kind of auspicious bird in myth and legend. It is also a mascot in Chinese traditional culture and gradually becomes the representative of women. In symbolises a happy marriage and good luck in Su Xiu.

Mandarin ducks

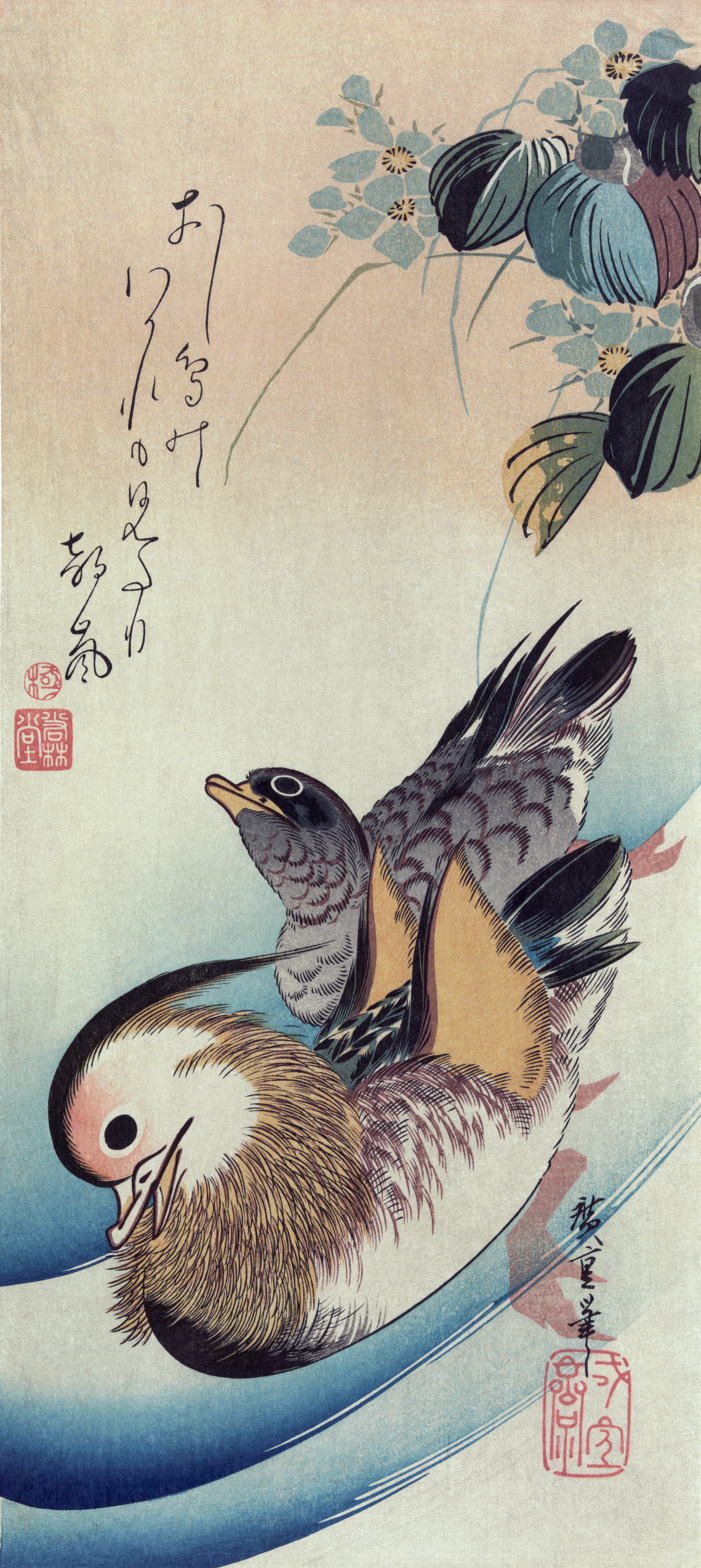
Mandarin ducks

Mandarin ducks are famous ornamental birds in China. Their images are widely used in the embroidery art. It's It symbolizes faithful love and a happy marriage.

Bat

Bats symbolize luck and wealth. The bat is thus used because the words “bat” and “happiness” have the same sound, although there is a slight difference in tone.

Kylin in traditional Chinese designs

Kylin

Kylin (Qilin) is a kind of auspicious animal in Chinese mythology, symbolizing rarity and auspiciousness.

Peony

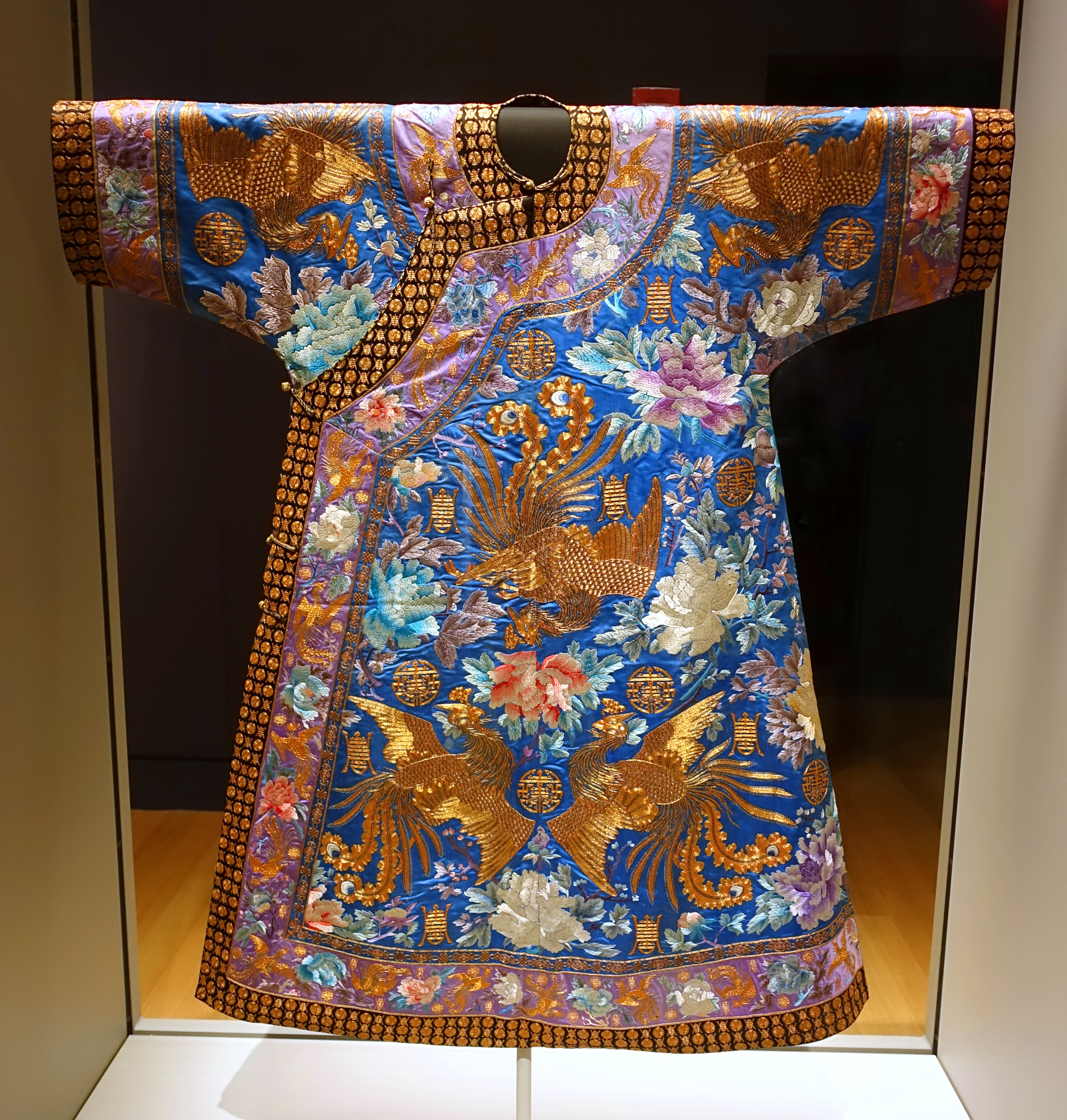
Robe with phoenixes

Peony is the “queen of the flowers”. In traditional Chinese designs, peonies are often used as symbols of great wealth and honor.

Lotus

Lotus belongs to the aquatic root plant of water lily family, which has a high status in Chinese traditional culture and is called "the gentleman in the flower". It's a symbol of integrity and purity. Because it rises undefiled from the black mud. Not only that, lotus is also the main symbol of Buddhism. The embroidery with lotus patterns sometimes shows the sanctity and purity of Buddhism, and inviolability.

Peach, pomegranate and hand fruit

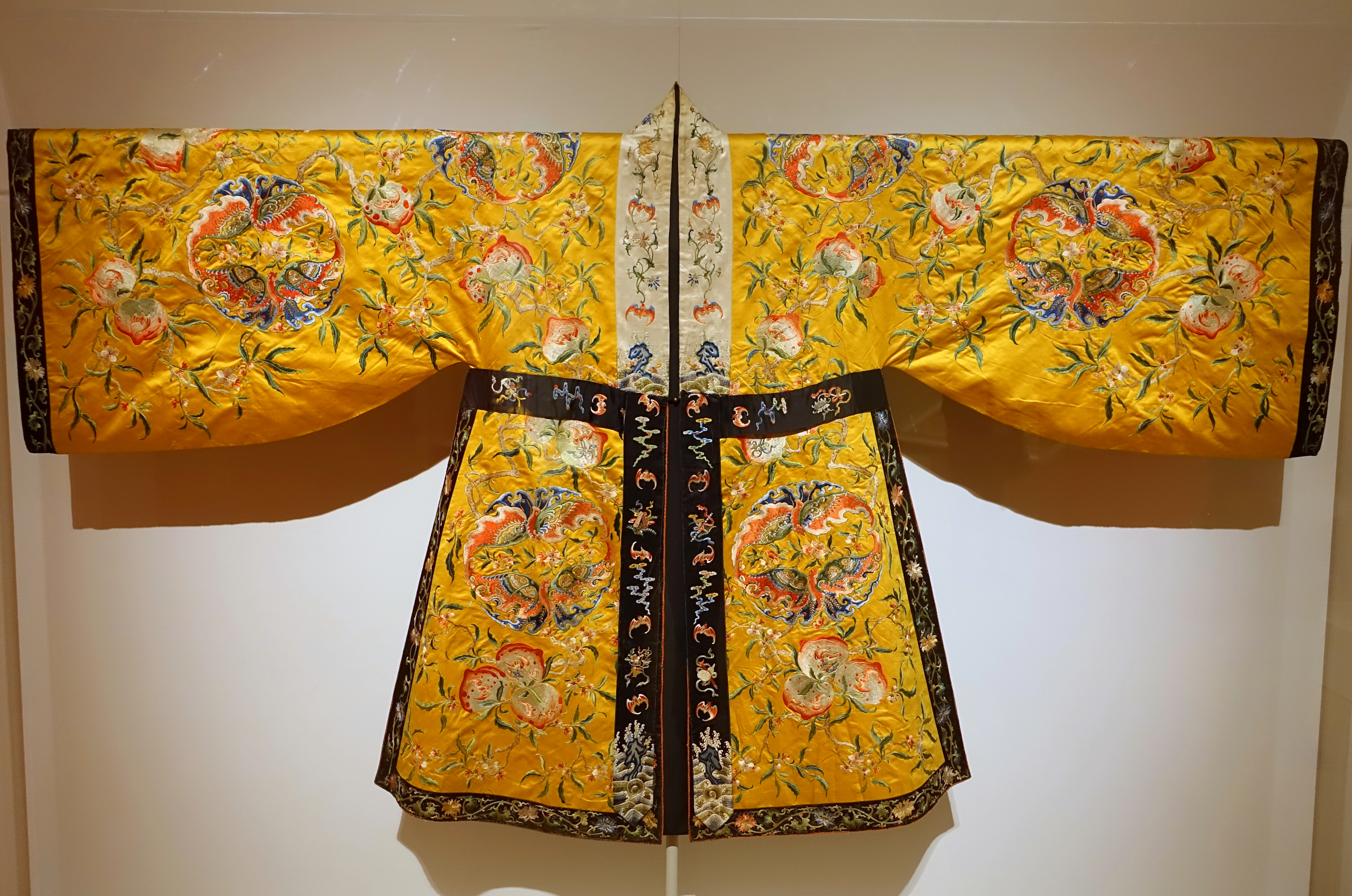
Theatrical robe with peaches, butterflies, bats, and clouds

They symbolize longevity. A free translation of their meaning would be, “May you have many years, many honors and as many male descendants as there are seeds in a pome granate.”

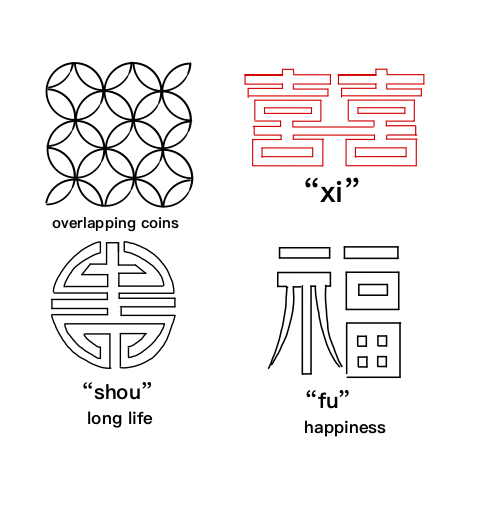
The image of overlapping coins and word image

Overlapping coins

The overlapping coin with a square hole is a symbol of wealth. A favorite background is a series of overlapping circles which forms an all-over design of these coins.

Words

People will embroider words to express the meaning intuitively. Like “shou” means long life, “fu” means happiness, "xi” is used for marriage, meaning beautiful love.

== Innovation ==
=== Technique ===
In the modern craft, Su Xiu has carried on the innovation which combine the old embroidery technology and the modern technology or material.

After the 19th century, people invented the machine of embroidery. Machines stitches could save time and have greater advantages than hand stitches. Although the machine stitches are more convenient, they only play an auxiliary role and improve embroidery development, never replacing handwork. Modern technology is a combination of machine and hand. Together they can complement each other.

For the embroidery in silk scarf, embroidery is combined Su Xiu with Swarovski crystals. The combination of two different cultures makes Su Xiu more acceptable to modern fashion, expanding into a new space. In the Suorang 2012 collection, the design adopts method of combining embroidery with beads.

=== Art form ===
With the change of time, in order to comply with the development of modern. Su Xiu is not only used in the design of clothes, but also in the design of furniture and jewelry.

Like the ring with Su embroidery. The ring with embroidery instead of gems or diamonds, break the viewers’ inherent imagination, thus deepening the visual experience.

=== Theme ===
The original patterns of Su Xiu are mostly animals and plants. The whole embroidery picture can be very impactful, but may not accord with the aesthetic concept of modern people. In order to adapt to modern aesthetics, the embroidery created new patterns such as geometric patterns, or western paintings, which are accepted by more people. These show the aesthetic nature and the decorative elements of designs.

== Value ==
=== Historical value ===
Suzhou embroidery has experienced many dynasties in the course of its 2,000-year historical development, and the works of Su Xiu in each dynasty are strongly influenced by The Times. Due to the origin of Su Xiu is in the Suzhou, with its grid structure of roads and waterways, ancient Suzhou used to be one of the largest cities in China. The folk embroidery products have been rich in color and life atmosphere of the town, which reflects the cultural life and folk customs of the people of Suzhou from one side. We can see the changes of Su Xiu in the works of different periods. Through these works, we can study the life customs, social customs and aesthetic styles of Chinese people in different era.

=== Cultural value ===
As a traditional handicraft, Su Xiu has always been closely combined with Chinese traditional culture and Western culture. It already becomes an important part of Chinese traditional culture. Among them, the traditional Chinese calligraphy and painting have been incisively and vividly expressed in the Su Xiu works, which mostly draw the artistic essence from them. Contemporary Chinese culture and art are also fully expressed in Su Xiu works. Not only that, Su Xiu also combined the Western culture such as the oil painting. Su embroidery shows oil paintings with needle and thread. Makes people feel the integration of Chinese and western cultures.

=== Artistic value ===
The artistic value of Su Xiu is mainly reflected in its exquisite craftsmanship. Artists of Su Xiu embroidered their works with needles and threads instead of pigment. Due to the artistic effect of silk, the calligraphy and painting patterns on the embroidery products appeared more vivid. Whether it is to show landscapes, flowers, birds, animals or figures, exquisite Su embroidery skills can make it looks truly. Because of this, Su Xiu is praised as "the pearl of the east" by people all over the world.

=== Collection value ===
Suzhou embroidery inherits an ancient and traditional craft with strong national characteristics, and its value potential mainly comes from the scarcity and uniqueness of the works' resources. Due to the complexity of Su Xiu technology, each process has different techniques, and a good embroidery product often takes several years or even longer to complete, which also leads to fewer and fewer people willing to learn and master Su embroidery techniques in contemporary fast-paced life.

== Protection ==
In October 1986 (Ming dynasty), Suzhou city set up the Chinese embroidery art museum. Displaying more than 200 embroidery products from The Han dynasty to the present.

On May 20, 2006, Su Xiu was designated an intangible cultural heritage of China. On May 24, 2018, Su Xiu was selected as one of the first batch of China national traditional craft revitalization and protection objects.
