= Satin stitch =

Flat embroidery stitch

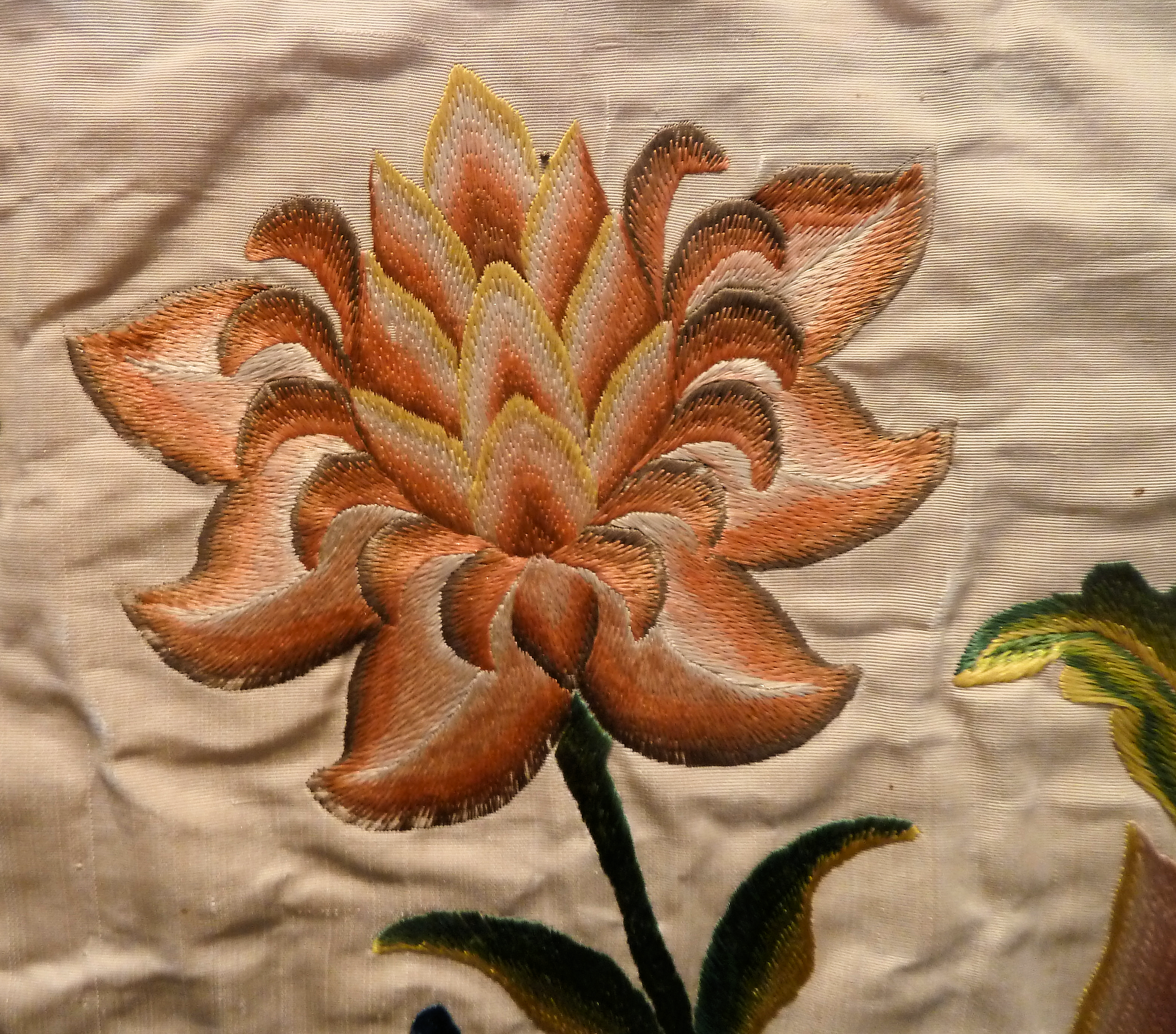
Satin stitch in silk. Detail of an altar frontal, France or Italy, 1730–40, Los Angeles County Museum of Art, M.2009.76.

In sewing and embroidery, a satin stitch or damask stitch is a series of flat stitches that are used to completely cover a section of the background fabric. Narrow rows of satin stitch can be executed on a standard sewing machine using a zigzag stitch or a special satin stitch foot.

In order to maintain a smooth edge, shapes can be outlined with back, split or chain stitch before the entire shape including the outline is covered with satin stitch. In traditional practice, satin stitch is employed to fill an area without the presence of an outline, resulting in smooth shapes and even lines created by the stitching.

Machine-made satin stitch is often used to outline and attach appliques to the ground fabric.

== Geography ==
The satin stitch is a common form of needlework traditions worldwide; it is notable in North Africa, South America, Western Asia, Southeast Asia, the Indian subcontinent, and the Middle East. Satin stitch is also characteristic of Chinese embroidery.

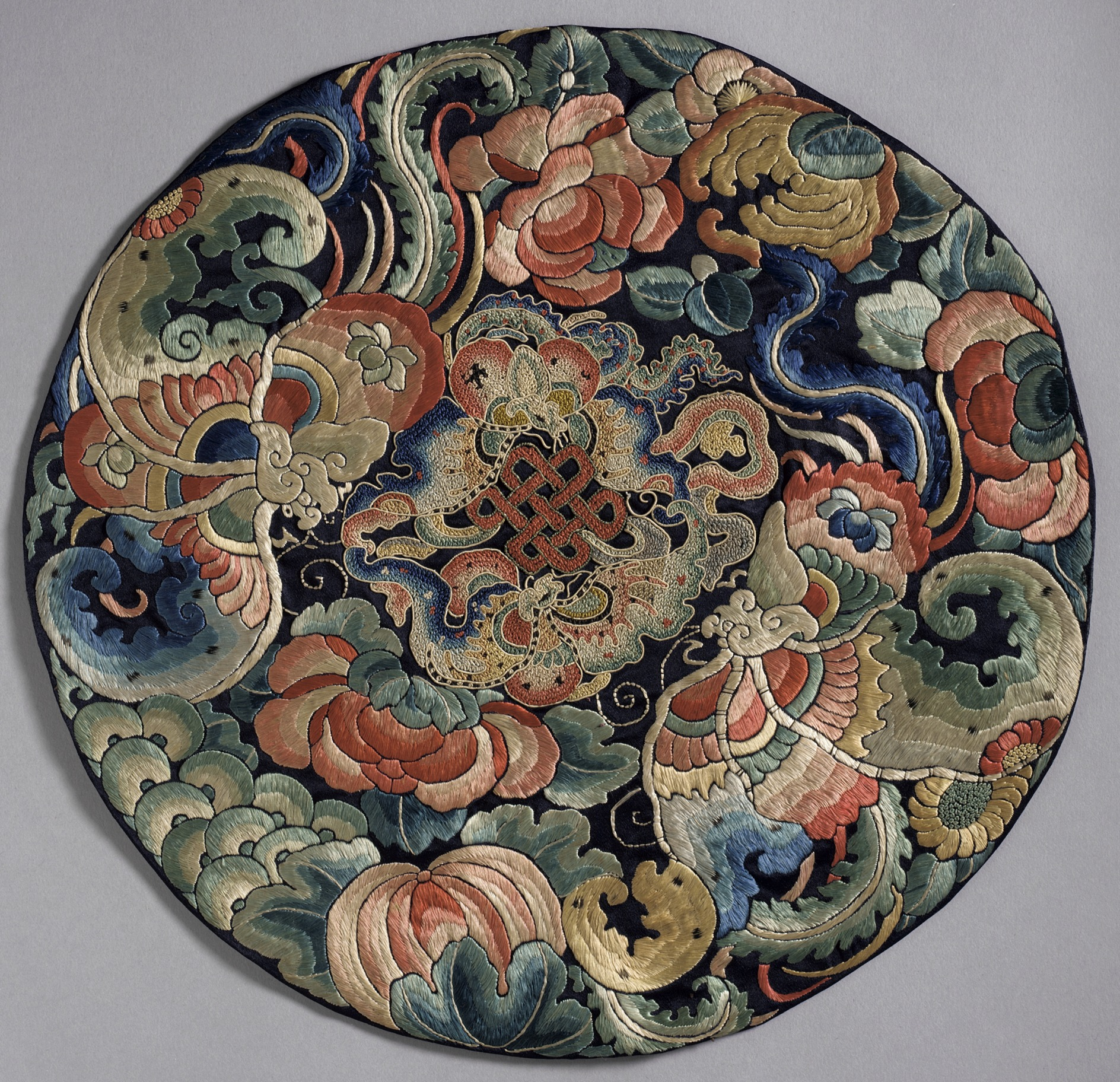
Roundels in Peking knot and satin stitch, Qing dynasty, China

=== China ===
Satin stitch is one of the two main types of Chinese embroidery stitches along with the Pekin knots. It is the most frequently used form of stitches in Chinese embroidery. From the ancient times to the Tang dynasty, the chain stitches were typically used in embroidery. However, other forms of embroidery techniques existed including satin stitches which dates as early as the Han dynasty.

The use of satin stitches became more frequent in the late Tang dynasty to the early Song dynasty. During the Tang dynasty, figural imagery, which was partially influenced by the growth of Buddhist imagery, first appeared; this contributed to the decline of chain stitches as satin stitches could provide better render scenes of Buddhist donor figures. Satin stitches then became the popular embroidery technique later on.

=== Indian subcontinent ===
Satin stitch used in Kashmir is a variation of the Chinese satin stitch which originated from China.

== Variants ==
Variants of the satin stitch include:

- Bourdon stitch - a tightly spaced, decorative stitch typically used for monograms and decorative purposes.
- Brick stitch, in which alternate rows of satin stitches are offset by half the stitch length. Worked in several related colors, brick stitch allows stepped shading. (Brick stitch is also the name of a beadwork technique.)
- Encroaching satin stitch, in which the top of each row of stitches is set between the bottom of the stitches on the previous row.
- Long-and-short stitch, used for fine shading; in the first row of satin stitches, every other stitch is half the length of its neighbors. Subsequent rows in related colors are all of the same length.
- Padded satin stitch, in which shapes are filled with rows of small running stitches which are then covered with satin stitches.

=== Thread ===
Satin stitch is frequently made with embroidery thread, which has less twist than standard sewing thread. This gives a more uniform effect, with the individual threads' filaments merging.

While good sewing threads produce acceptable satin stitch, low quality threads usually do not sit straight, and produce an uneven result. The colour of each thread usually does not matter.

=== Stitch gallery ===
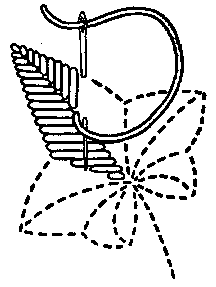
Satin stitch

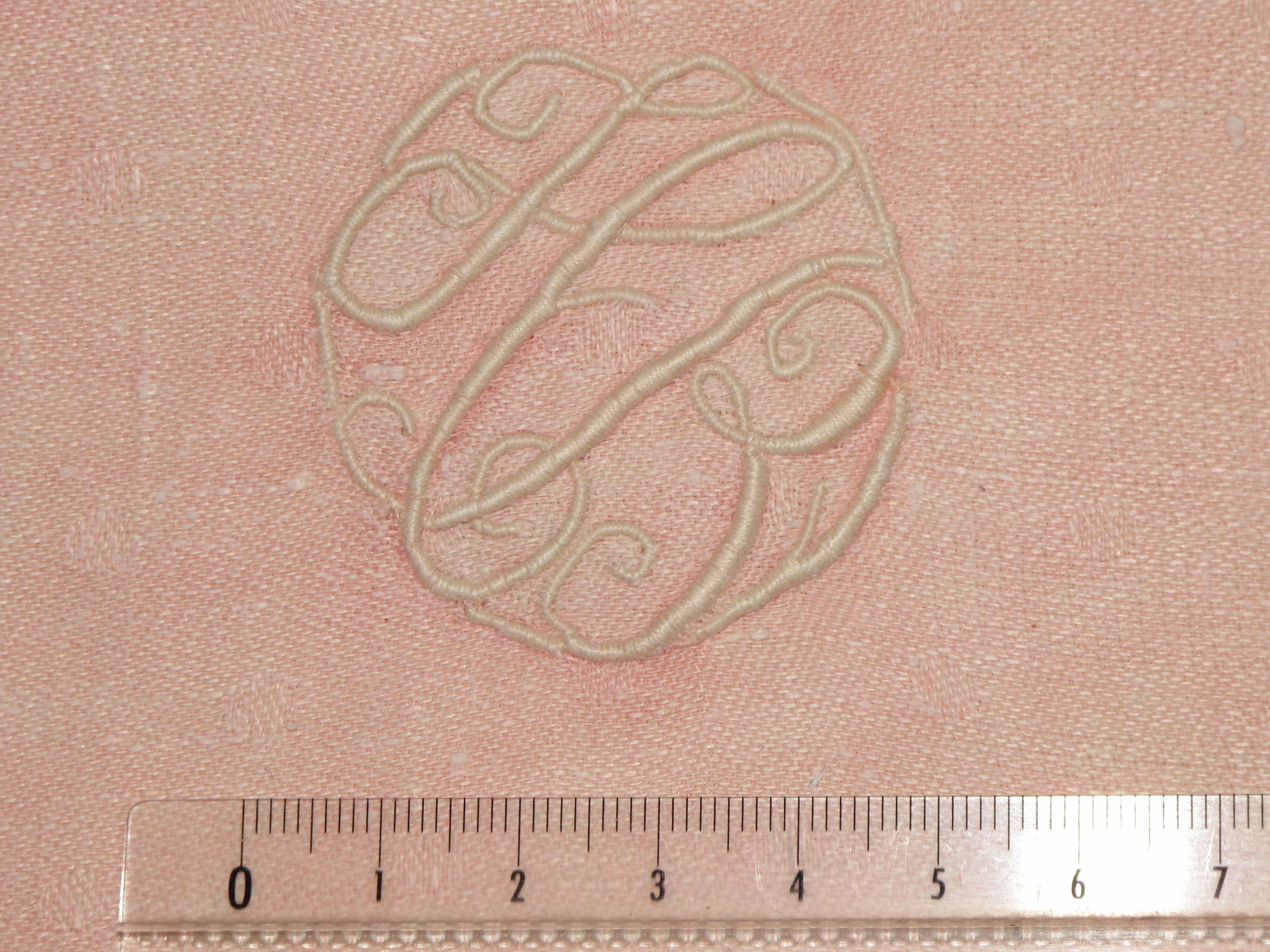
Bourdon stitch

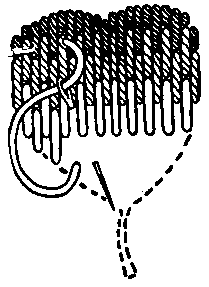
Brick stitch

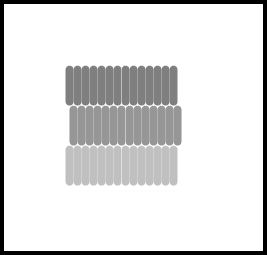
Encroaching satin stitch

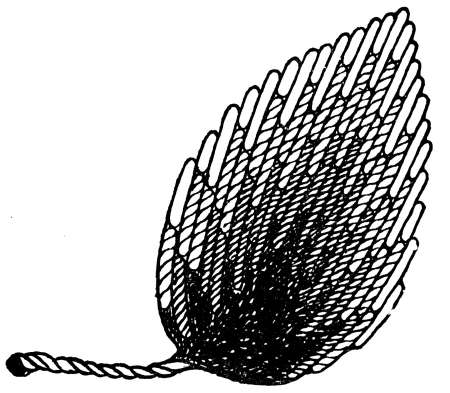
Long-and-short stitch

== See also ==
- Embroidery stitch
- Chinese embroidery
