= Clothing =

Objects worn to cover the body

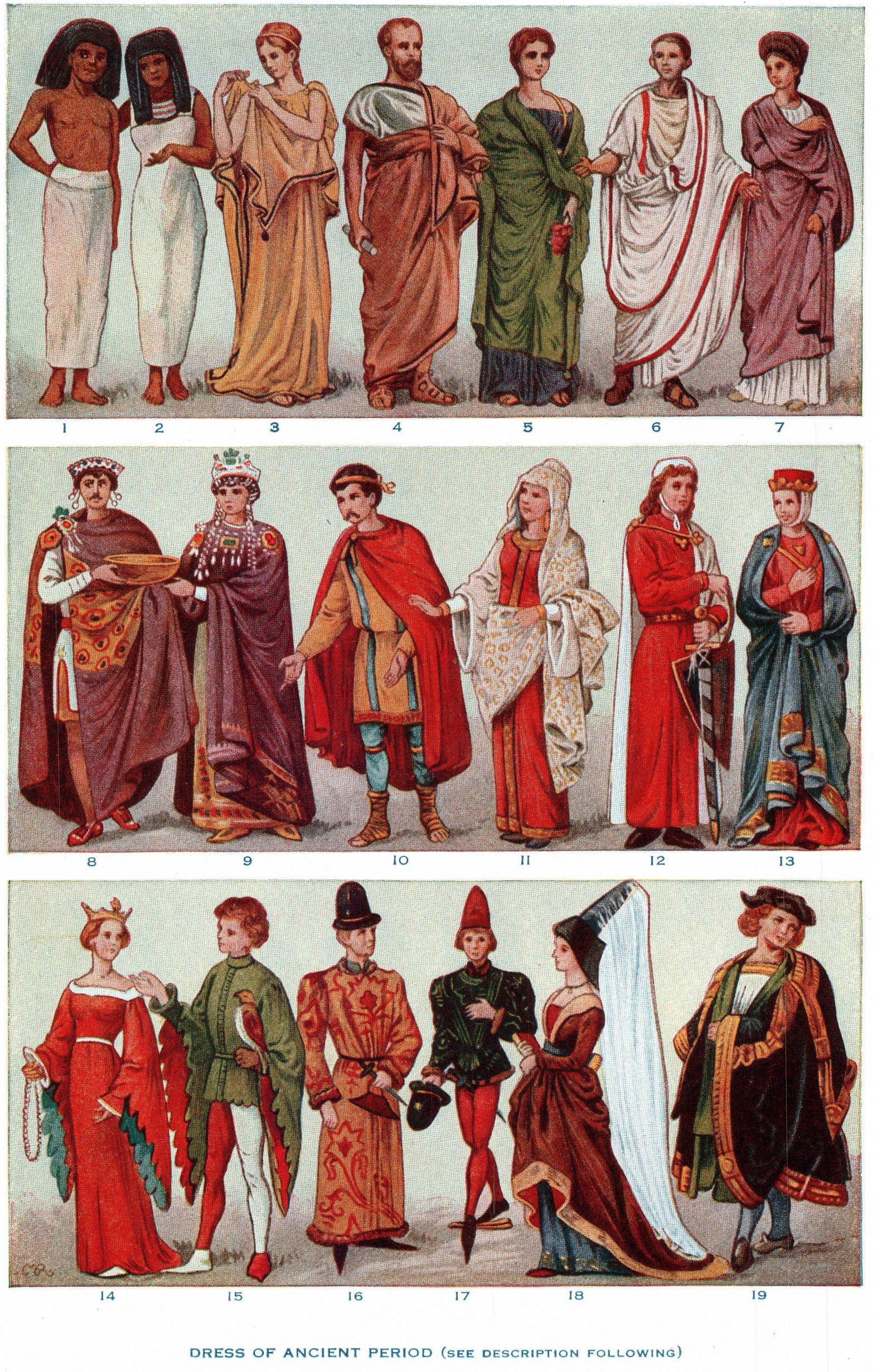
Clothing in history, showing (from top) Egyptians, Ancient Greeks, and Romans; Byzantines and Franks; and thirteenth- through fifteenth-century Europeans

Clothing (also known as clothes, garments, dress, apparel, or attire) consists of items worn on the body. Clothing is typically made from textiles but may also be made from animal skins, furs, and other natural materials and synthetic fibres. Clothing is a feature of every known human society, and its form and use vary according to climate, culture, available materials, technology, social norms, and individual preference.

Clothing serves protective, physiological, social, and cultural functions by providing comfort, thermal regulation, protection against environmental hazards, and specialized protection for particular occupations, sports, and other activities. Clothing also expresses social status, gender, cultural identity, religious affiliation, modesty, and personal style, and plays a central role in fashion.

Humans likely began wearing clothing at least tens of thousands of years ago, and early clothing was made from animal skins and plant fibres before the widespread use of woven textiles.

Over time, advances in textile production, tailoring, and industrial manufacturing transformed clothing production into one of the world's largest industries. The garment and textile industries employ millions of people, play an important role in global trade, and face challenges related to working conditions and sustainability. The clothing life cycle encompasses the care, maintenance, reuse, recycling, and disposal of garments.

== Origin and history ==
=== Early use ===
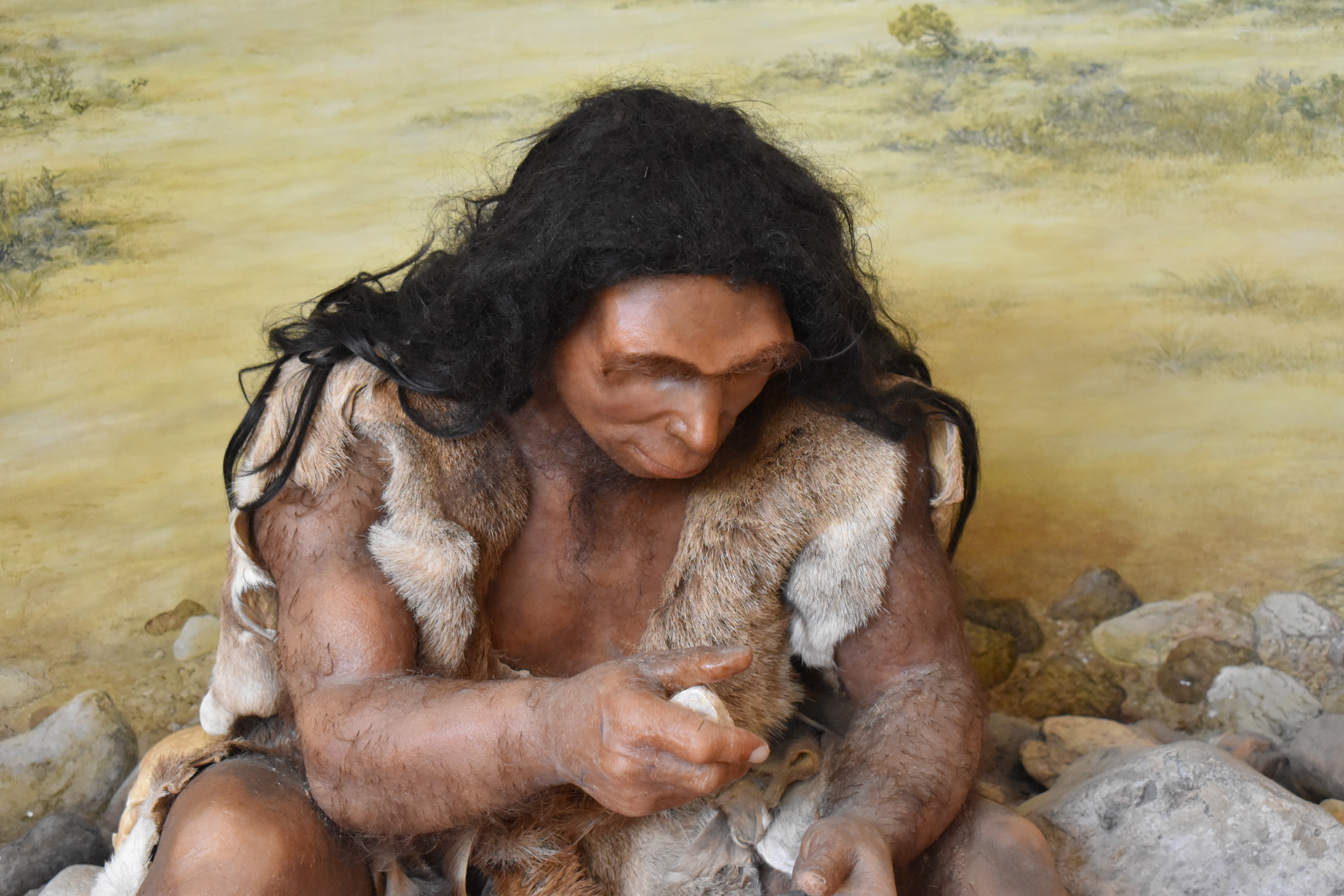
Homo heidelbergensis likely used fur clothing to adapt to the colder climate of Europe.

Estimates of when humans began wearing clothes range from 40,000 to as many as 3 million years ago. A 2003 study suggested humans were wearing clothing at least 100,000 years ago, based on evidence from lice. Human body lice cannot survive outside clothing and die within a few hours without shelter. This strongly implies that the date of the body louse's speciation from its parent, Pediculus humanus, could not have occurred earlier than the earliest human adoption of clothing. This date, at which the body louse (P. humanus corporis) diverged from both its parent species and its sibling subspecies, the head louse (P. humanus capitis), has been estimated to be between 40,000 and 170,000 years before present. However, recent transcriptome analyses cast doubt on whether lice provide a means to date the origin of clothes since they have found that "body and head lice were almost genetically identical. Indeed, the phenotypic flexibility associated with the emergence of body lice is probably a result of regulatory changes, perhaps epigenetic in origin, triggered by environmental signals."

Dating with direct archeological evidence produces dates consistent with those of lice. In September 2021, scientists reported evidence of clothes being made 120,000 years ago based on findings in deposits in Morocco.

The development of clothing is deeply connected to human evolution, with early garments likely consisting of animal skins and natural fibers adapted for protection and social signaling. According to anthropologists and archaeologists, the earliest clothing likely consisted of fur, leather, leaves, or grass that was draped, wrapped, or tied around the body. Knowledge of such clothing remains inferential, as clothing materials deteriorate quickly compared with stone, bone, shell, and metal artifacts. Archeologists have identified very early sewing needles of bone and ivory from about 30,000 BC, found near Kostenki, Russia, in 1988; in 2016, they identified a needle at least 50,000 years old from Denisova Cave in Siberia made by Denisovans. Dyed flax fibers that date back to 34,000 BC and could have been used in clothing have been found in a prehistoric cave in Georgia.

The oldest known piece of woven clothing is the Tarkhan dress, an over 5000 year old linen garment.

=== Making clothing ===
Several distinct human cultures, including those residing in the Arctic Circle, have historically crafted their garments exclusively from treated and adorned animal furs and skins. In contrast, numerous other societies have complemented or substituted leather and skins with textiles woven, knitted, or twined from a diverse array of animal and plant fibers, such as linen, wool, cotton, silk, hemp, and ramie.

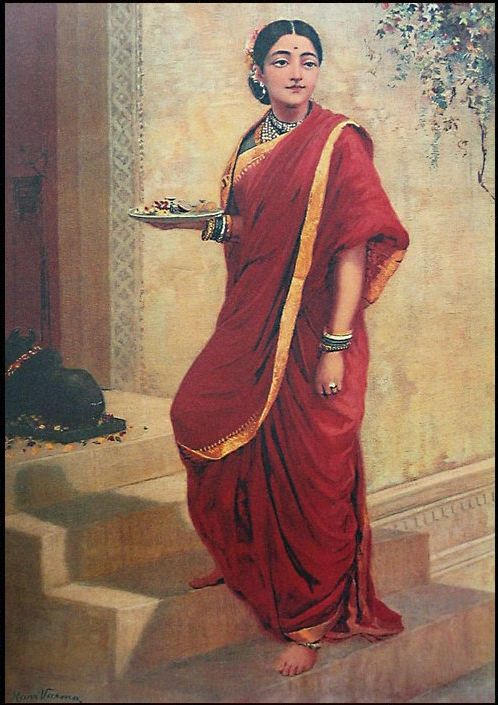
Hindu lady wearing sari, one of the most ancient and popular pieces of clothing in the Indian subcontinent, painting by Raja Ravi Varma

Making fabric by hand is a tedious, labor-intensive process involving fiber preparation, spinning, and weaving. The textile industry was the first to be mechanized—with the powered loom—during the Industrial Revolution.

Different cultures have developed various ways of making clothes from cloth. One approach involves draping the cloth. Many people wore, and still wear, garments consisting of rectangles of cloth wrapped to fit—for example, the dhoti for men and the sari for women in the Indian subcontinent, the Scottish kilt, and the Javanese sarong. The clothes may be tied up (dhoti and sari) or held in place with pins or belts (kilt and sarong). The cloth remains uncut, and people of various sizes can wear the garment.

Another approach involves measuring, cutting, and sewing the cloth by hand or with a sewing machine. Clothing can be cut from a sewing pattern and adjusted by a tailor to the wearer's measurements. An adjustable sewing mannequin or dress form is used to create form-fitting clothing. If the fabric is expensive, the tailor tries to use every bit of the rectangular cloth when constructing the garment; perhaps cutting triangular pieces from one corner of the cloth and adding them elsewhere as gussets. Traditional European patterns for shirts and chemises take this approach. These remnants can also be reused to make patchwork pockets, hats, vests, and skirts.

Modern European fashion treats cloth much less conservatively, typically cutting in ways that leave various oddly-shaped cloth remnants. Industrial sewing operations sell these as waste; domestic sewers may turn them into quilts.

Over thousands of years of making clothing, humans have created an array of styles, many of which have been reconstructed from surviving garments, photographs, paintings, mosaics, and written descriptions. Costume history can inspire current fashion designers, as well as costumiers for plays, films, television, and historical reenactment.

== Clothing as comfort ==
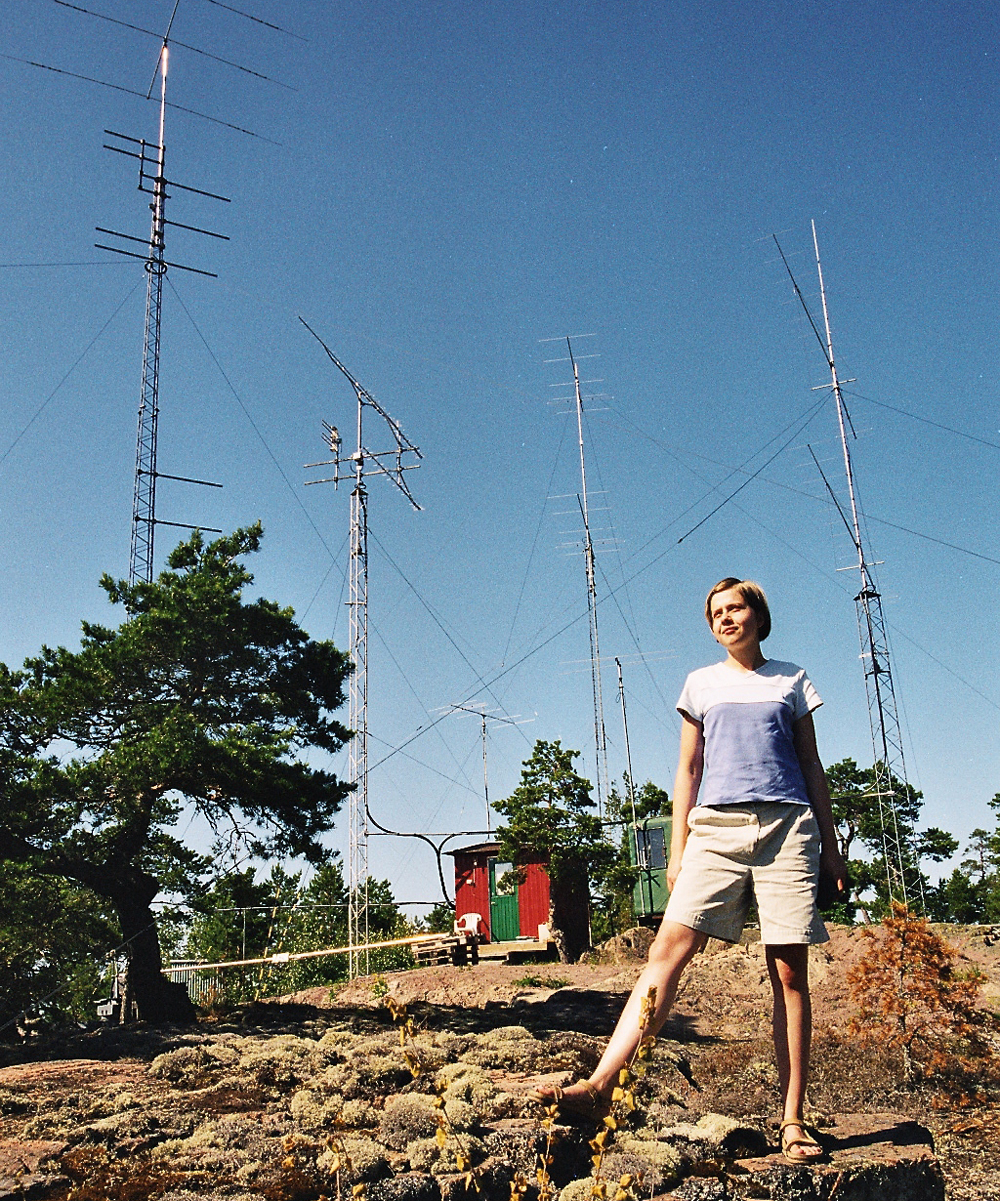
A young woman wearing a T-shirt and shorts during summer in Åland

Comfort is related to various perceptions and to physiological, social, and psychological needs; after food, clothing satisfies these comfort needs. Clothing provides aesthetic, tactile, thermal, moisture, and pressure comfort.

=== Aesthetic comfort ===
Visual perception is influenced by color, fabric construction, style, garment fit, fashion compatibility, and finish of clothing material. Aesthetic comfort is necessary for psychological and social comfort.

=== Thermoregulation and thermophysiological comfort ===
Thermophysiological comfort is the capacity of the clothing material to maintain the balance of moisture and heat between the body and the environment. It is a property of textile materials that creates ease by maintaining moisture and thermal levels in a human's resting and active states. The selection of textile material significantly affects the wearer's comfort. Different textile fibers have unique properties that make them suitable for use in various environments. For example, natural fibers are breathable and absorb moisture, while synthetic fibers are hydrophobic, repel moisture, and do not allow air to pass. Different environments demand a diverse selection of clothing materials. Hence, the appropriate choice is important. The major determinants that influence thermophysiological comfort are permeable construction, heat, and moisture transfer rate.

=== Thermal comfort ===
One of the primary criteria for our physiological needs is thermal comfort. The heat-dissipation effectiveness of clothing gives the wearer a feeling that is neither very hot nor very cold. The optimum temperature for thermal comfort of the skin surface is between 28 and 30 °C (82 and 86 °F). Thermophysiology reacts whenever the temperature falls below or exceeds the neutral point on either side; it is uncomfortable below 28 and above 30 degrees. Clothing maintains a thermal balance; it keeps the skin dry and cool. It helps to keep the body from overheating while avoiding heat from the environment.

=== Moisture comfort ===
Moisture comfort is a property related to avoiding a damp sensation.

=== Tactile comfort ===
Tactile comfort is a resistance to the discomfort related to the friction created by clothing against the body. It is related to the smoothness, roughness, softness, and stiffness of the fabric used in clothing. The degree of tactile discomfort may vary among individuals due to factors such as allergies, tickling, prickling, skin abrasion, coolness, and the fabric's weight, structure, and thickness. There are specific surface finishes (mechanical and chemical) that can enhance tactile comfort. Fleece sweatshirts and velvet clothing, for example. Soft, clingy, stiff, heavy, light, hard, sticky, scratchy, and prickly are all terms used to describe tactile sensations.

=== Pressure comfort ===
Pressure comfort is the comfort resulting from the sensory response of the body’s pressure receptors, located in the skin, to clothing. The sensory response is influenced by the material's structure: snugness, looseness, heaviness, lightness, softness, or stiffness.

== Functions ==
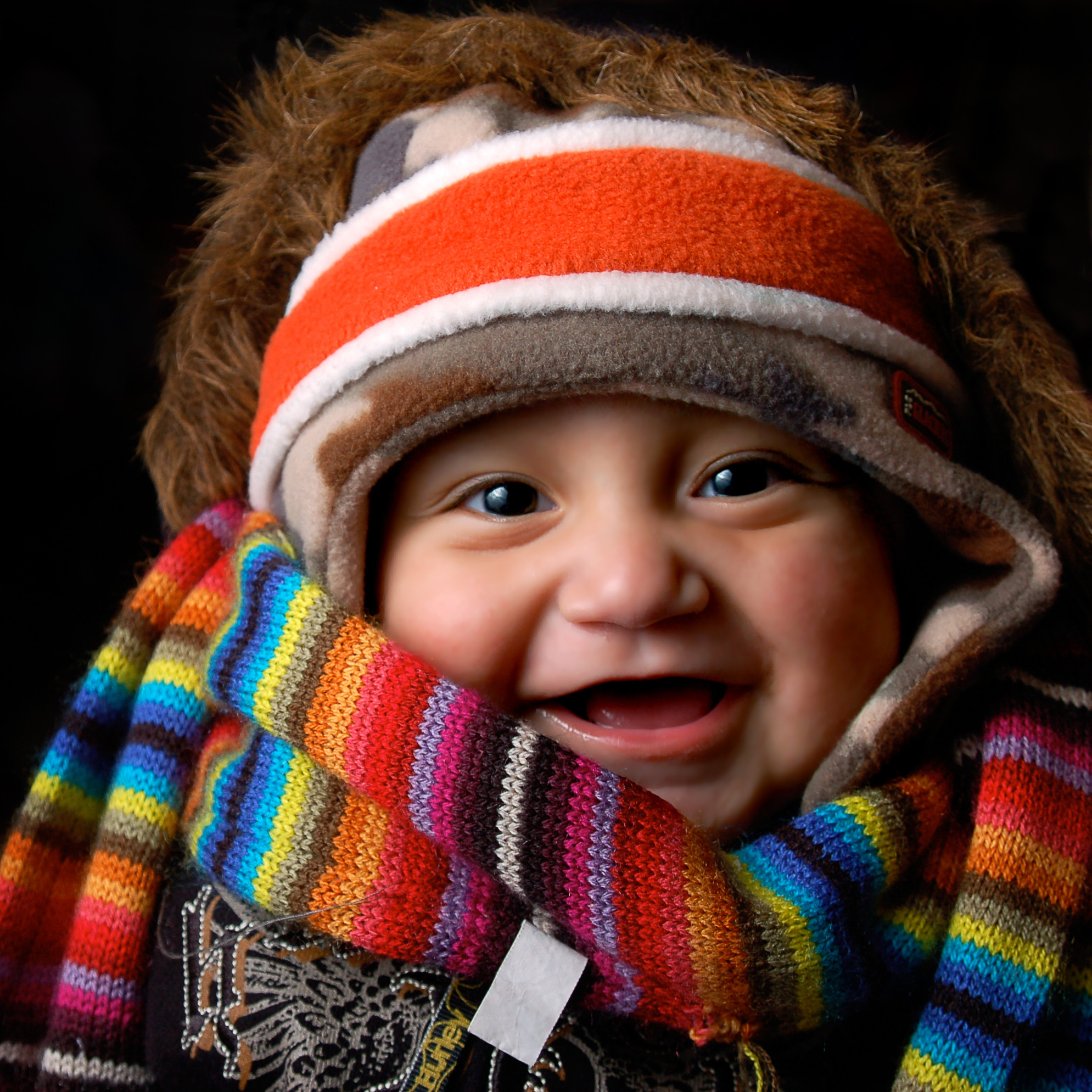
A baby wearing many items of winter clothing: headband, cap, fur-lined coat, scarf, and sweater

The most obvious function of clothing is to protect the wearer from the elements. It helps prevent wind damage and protects against sunburn. In the cold, it offers thermal insulation. Shelter can reduce the functional need for clothing. For example, coats, hats, gloves, and other outer layers are normally removed when entering a warm place. Similarly, clothing has seasonal and regional aspects, so thinner materials and fewer layers are generally worn in warmer regions and seasons than in colder ones. Boots, hats, jackets, ponchos, and coats designed to protect from rain and snow are specialized clothing items.

Clothing has been made from a wide variety of materials, ranging from leather and furs to woven fabrics and elaborate, exotic natural and synthetic fabrics. Not all body coverings are regarded as clothing. Articles carried rather than worn normally are considered accessories rather than clothing (such as Handbags), items worn on a single part of the body and easily removed (scarves), worn purely for adornment (jewelry), or items that do not serve a protective function. For instance, corrective eyeglasses, Arctic goggles, and sunglasses would not be considered an accessory because of their protective functions.

Clothing protects against many things that might injure or irritate the naked human body, including rain, snow, wind, and other weather, as well as the sun. Garments that are too sheer, thin, small, or tight offer less protection. Appropriate clothes can also reduce risk during activities such as work or sport. Some clothing protects against specific hazards, such as insects, toxic chemicals, weather, weapons, and abrasive substances.

Humans have devised clothing solutions to environmental or other hazards, such as space suits, armor, diving suits, swimsuits, beekeeper gear, motorcycle leathers, high-visibility clothing, and other pieces of protective clothing. The distinction between clothing and protective equipment is not always clear-cut, since clothes designed to be fashionable often have protective value, and clothes designed for function often incorporate corporate fashion elements.

The choice of clothes also has social implications. They cover body parts that social norms require to be covered, serve as adornment, and fulfill other social purposes. Someone who lacks the means to procure appropriate clothing due to poverty or affordability, or lack of inclination, sometimes is said to be worn, ragged, or shabby.

Clothing performs a range of social and cultural functions, such as individual, occupational, gender differentiation, and social status. In many societies, norms about clothing reflect standards of modesty, religion, gender, and social status. Clothing may also function as an adornment and an expression of personal taste or style.

== Scholarship ==
=== Function of clothing ===
Serious books on clothing and its functions appeared in the nineteenth century as European colonial powers interacted with new environments, such as tropical regions in Asia. Some scientific research into the multiple functions of clothing appeared in the first half of the twentieth century, with publications such as J.C. Flügel's Psychology of Clothes in 1930, and Newburgh's seminal Physiology of Heat Regulation and The Science of Clothing in 1949. By 1968, the field of Environmental Physiology had advanced and expanded significantly. Still, the science of clothing as it relates to environmental physiology had changed little. There has since been considerable research. The knowledge base has grown significantly, but the main concepts remain unchanged. Indeed, Newburgh's book continues to be cited by contemporary authors, including those attempting to develop thermoregulatory models of clothing development.

=== History of clothing ===
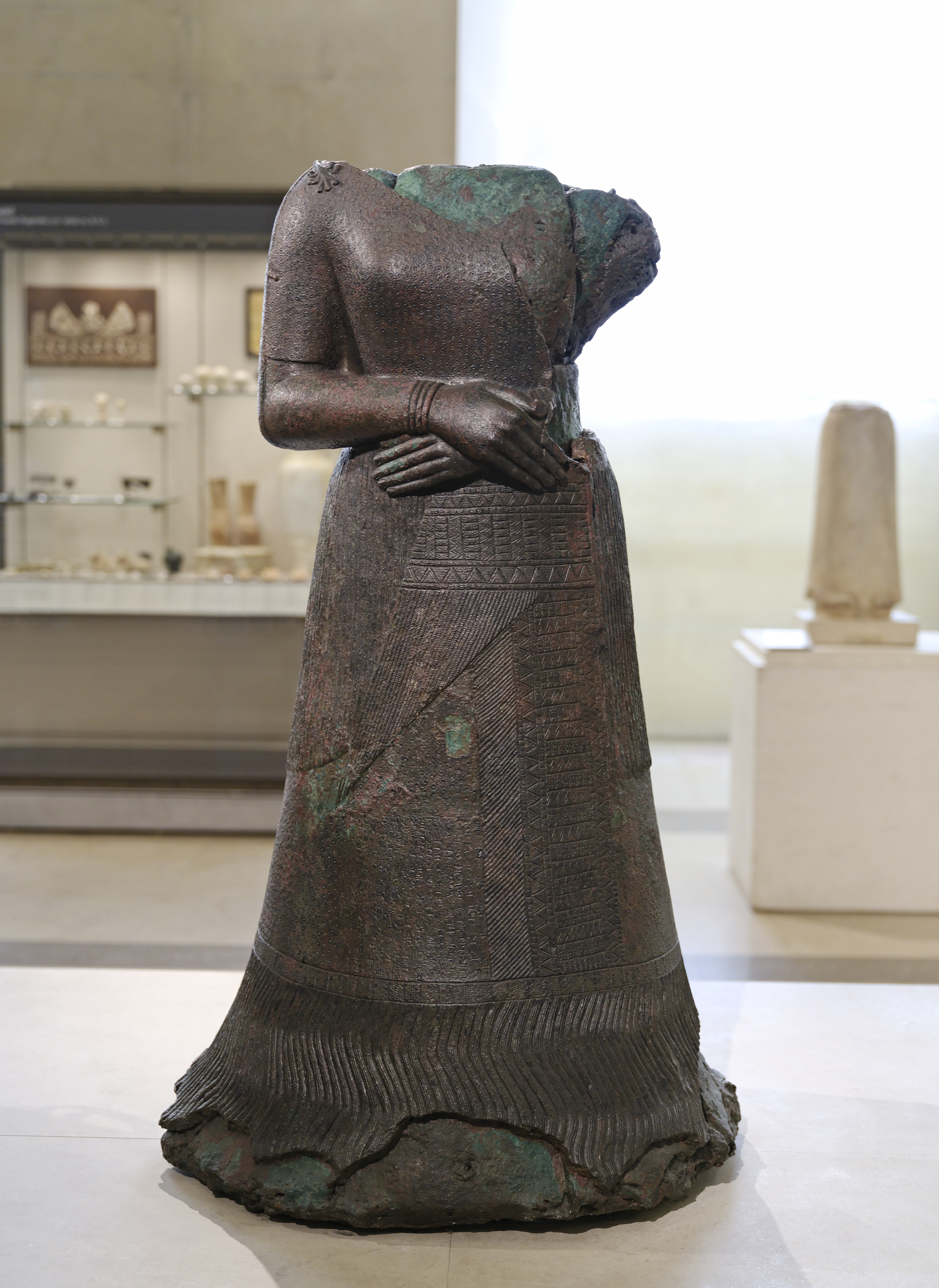
Clothing of the Napir Asu held in the Louvre museum, c. 1300 BC

Clothing reveals much about human history. According to Professor Kiki Smith of Smith College, garments preserved in collections are resources for study similar to books and paintings. Scholars around the world have studied a wide range of clothing topics, including the history of specific items of clothing, clothing styles in different cultural groups, and the business of clothing and fashion. The textile curator Linda Baumgarten writes that "clothing provides a remarkable picture of the daily lives, beliefs, expectations, and hopes of those who lived in the past.

Clothing presents many challenges to historians. Clothing made of textiles or skins is subject to decay, and the erosion of physical integrity may be seen as a loss of cultural information. Costume collections often focus on important pieces of clothing considered unique or otherwise significant, limiting the opportunities scholars have to study everyday clothing.

== Cultural aspects ==
Clothing has long served as a marker of social status, gender, and cultural identity, reflecting broader societal structures and values.

=== Gender differentiation ===
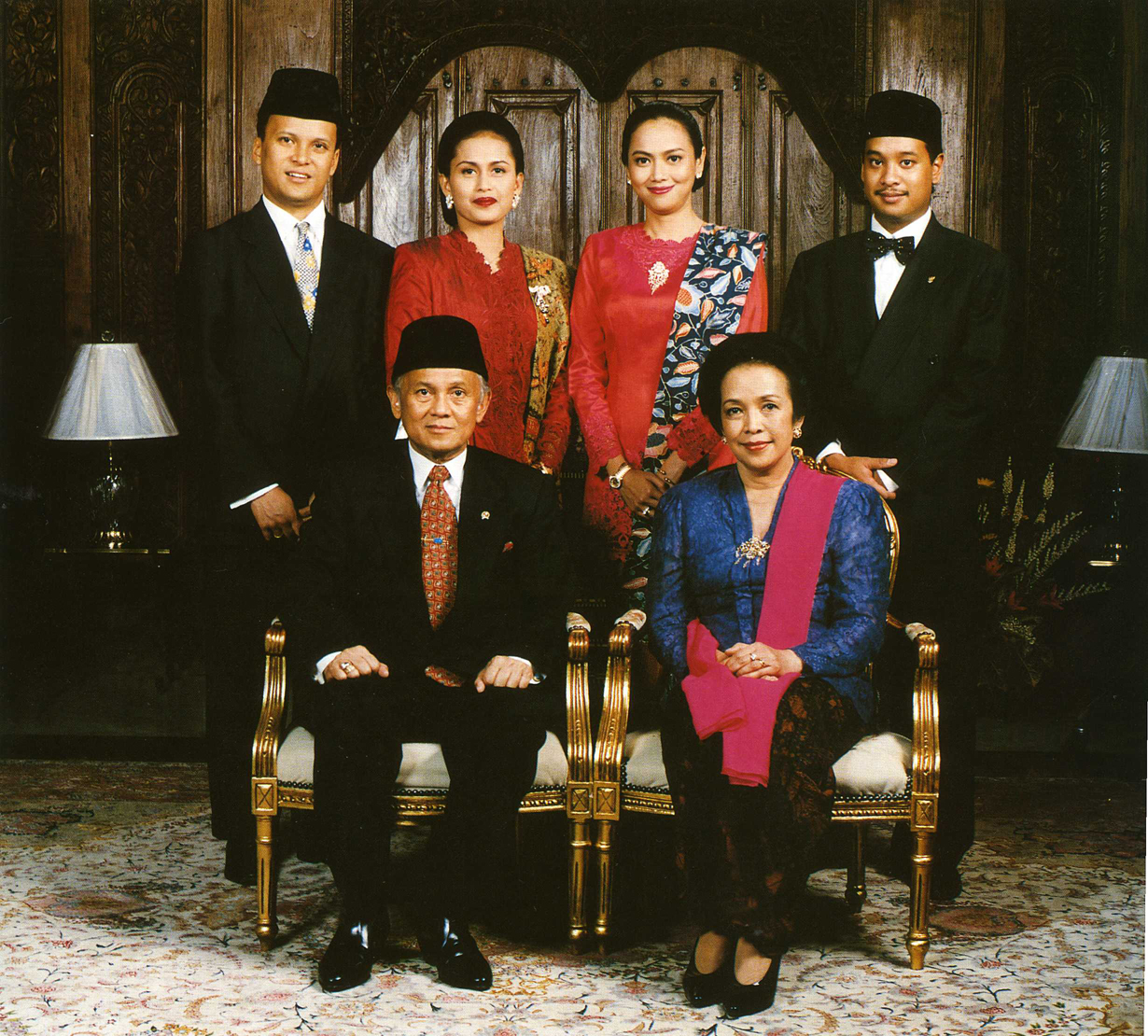
Formal family portrait of former Indonesian's President B.J. Habibie. Women wear kain batik and kebaya with selendang (sash), while men wear jas and dasi (western suit with tie) with peci cap.

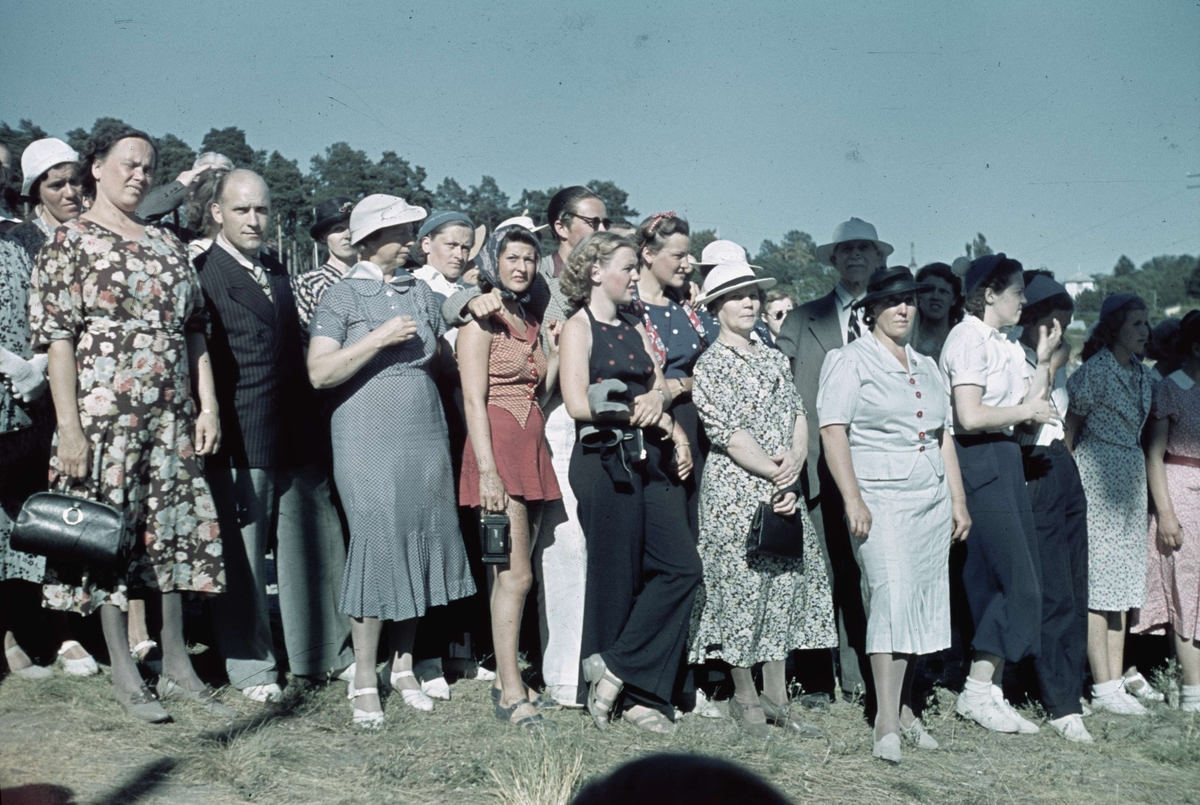
Men and women gathered at a sporting event in Sweden (1938)

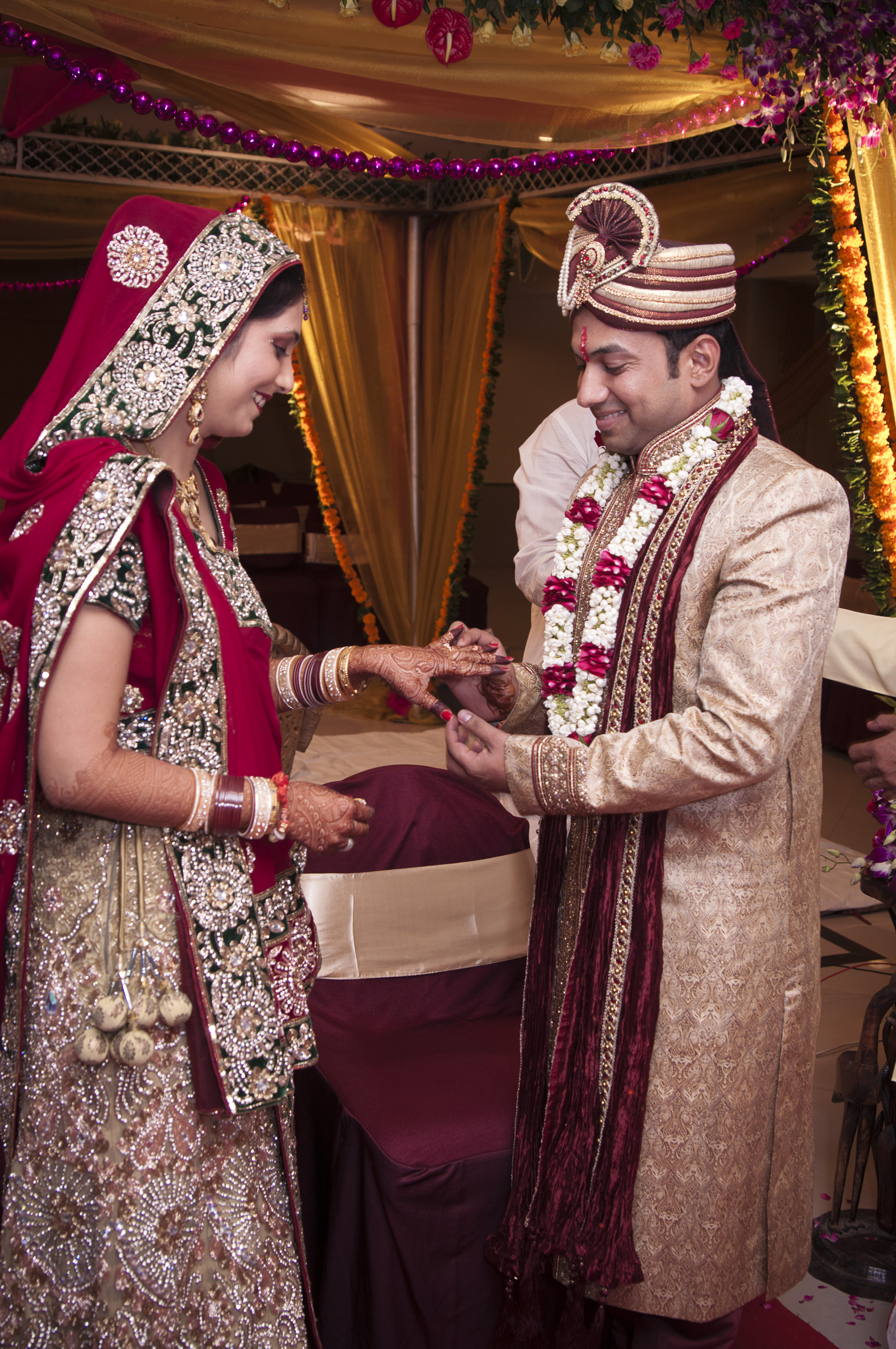
A Hindu North Indian wedding, the groom wearing a sherwani and pagri turban and the bride wearing a sari

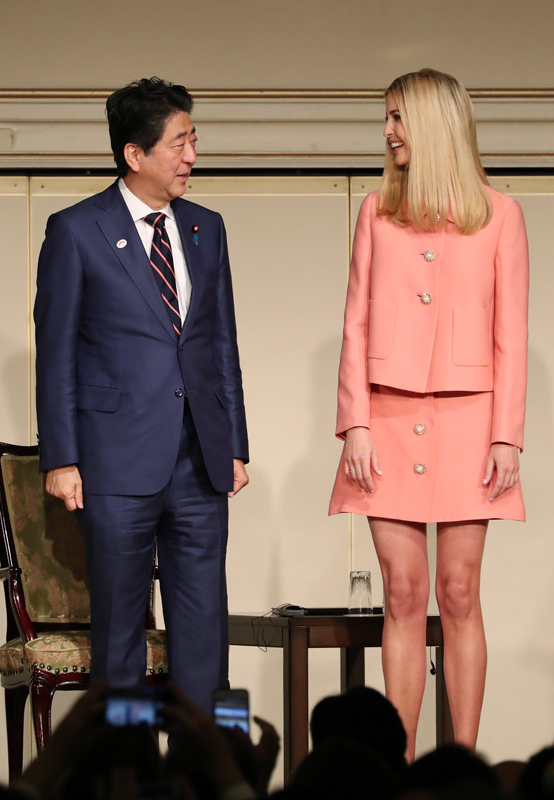
Japanese PM Shinzō Abe and Ivanka Trump (right) wearing Western-style gender-differentiated business suits (2017)

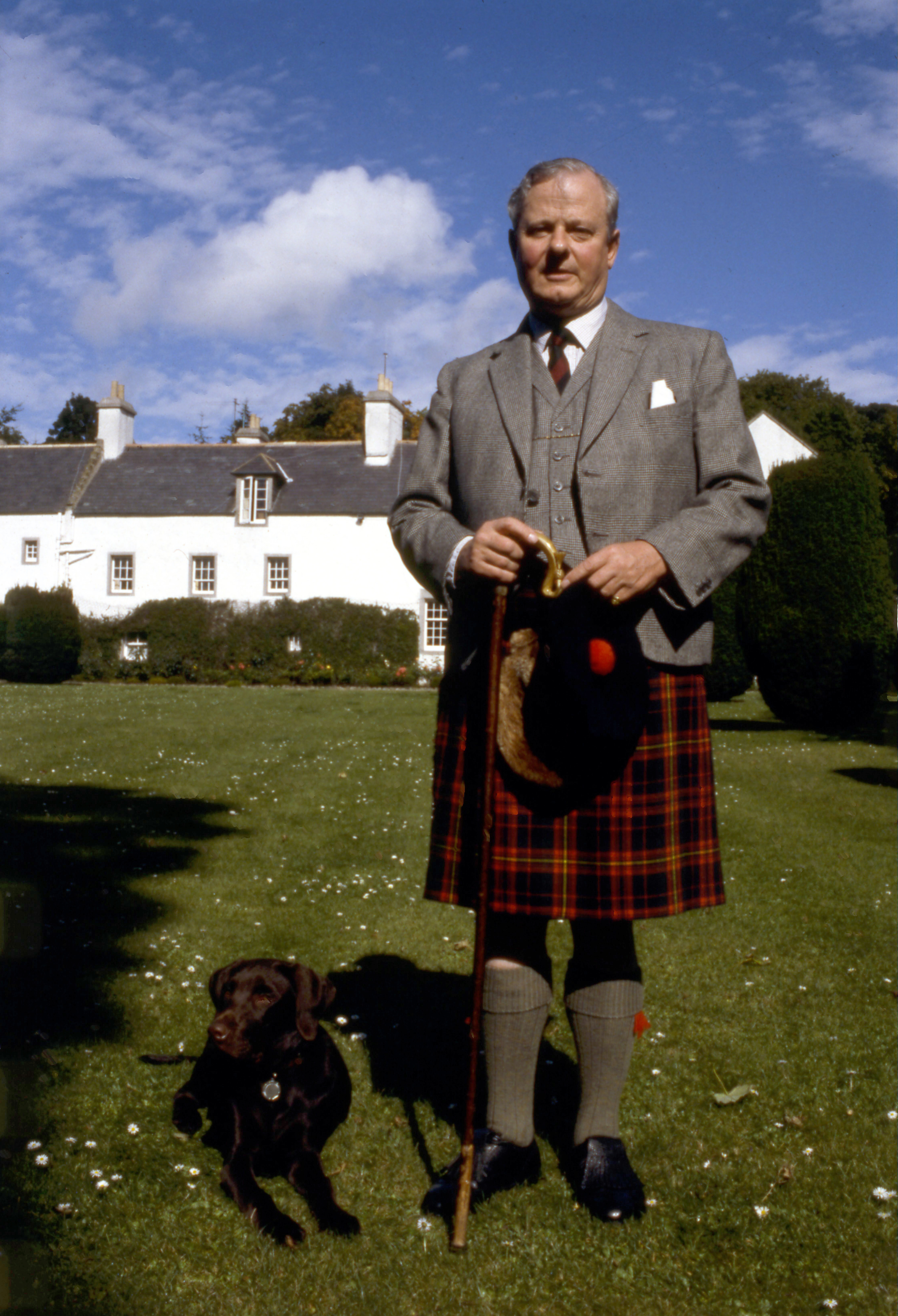
3rd Duke of Fife wearing a traditional Scottish kilt (1984)

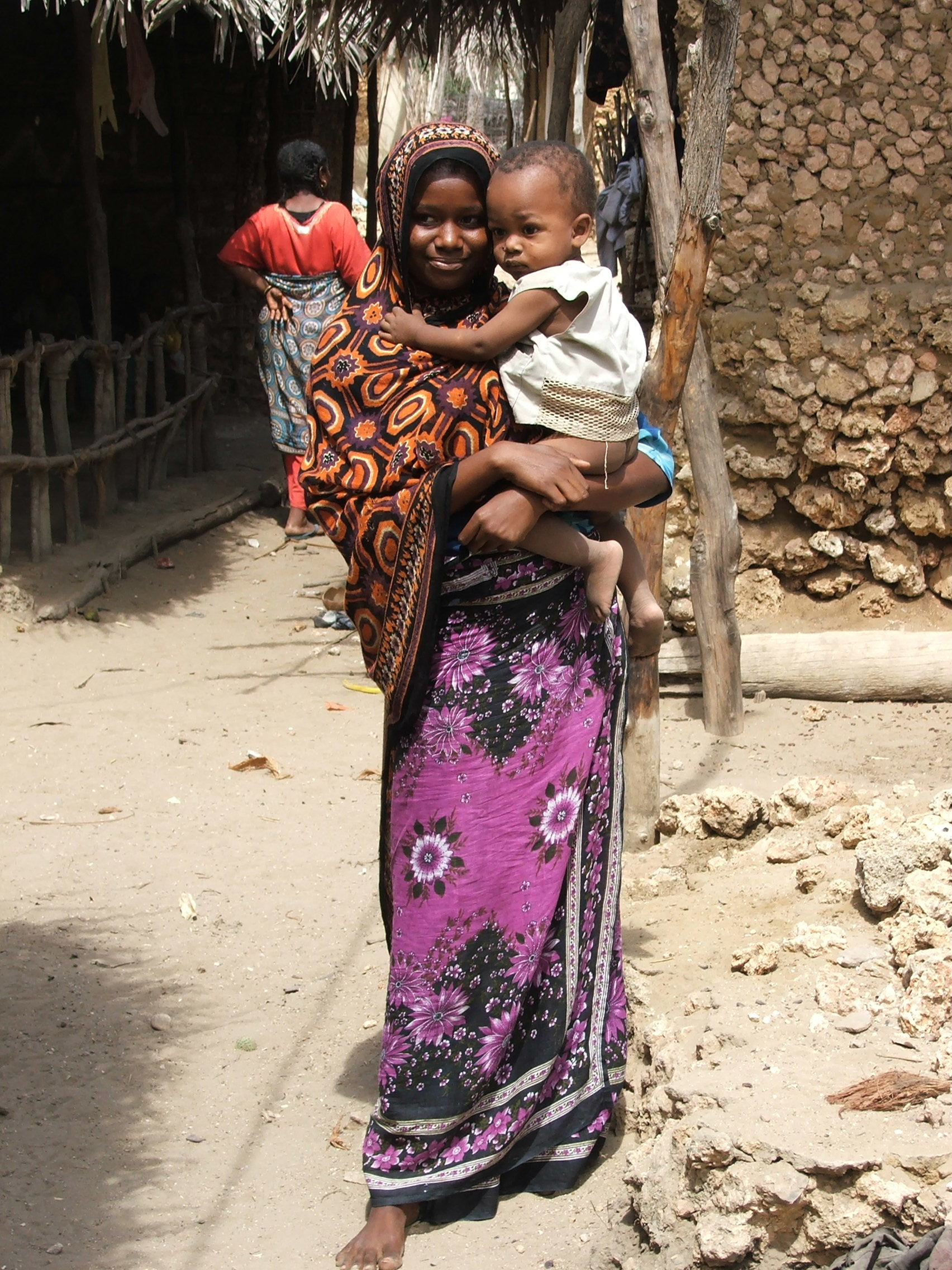
A kanga, worn throughout the African Great Lakes region

In most cultures, gender differentiation of clothing is considered appropriate. The differences are in styles, colors, fabrics, and types.

In contemporary Western societies, skirts, dresses, and high-heeled shoes are usually seen as women's clothing, while neckties are usually seen as men's clothing. Trousers were once seen as exclusively men's clothing, but nowadays are worn by both genders. Men's clothes are often more practical (that is, they can function well under a wide variety of situations), but a wider range of clothing styles is available for women. Typically, men are allowed to bare their chests in a greater variety of public places. It is generally common for a woman to wear clothing perceived as masculine, while the opposite is seen as unusual. The practice of wearing clothing associated with a different gender is called Cross-dressing. Contemporary men may sometimes choose to wear men's skirts such as togas or kilts in particular cultures, especially on ceremonial occasions. In the past, such garments were often worn as everyday clothing by men.

In some cultures, sumptuary laws regulate what men and women are required to wear. Islam requires women to wear certain attire, usually a hijab. The items required vary across Muslim societies; however, women are usually required to cover more of their bodies than men are. Articles of clothing that Muslim women wear under these laws or traditions range from the headscarf to the burqa.

Some contemporary clothing styles designed to be worn by either gender, such as T-shirts, originated as menswear, while others, such as the fedora, were originally styles for women.

=== Social status ===
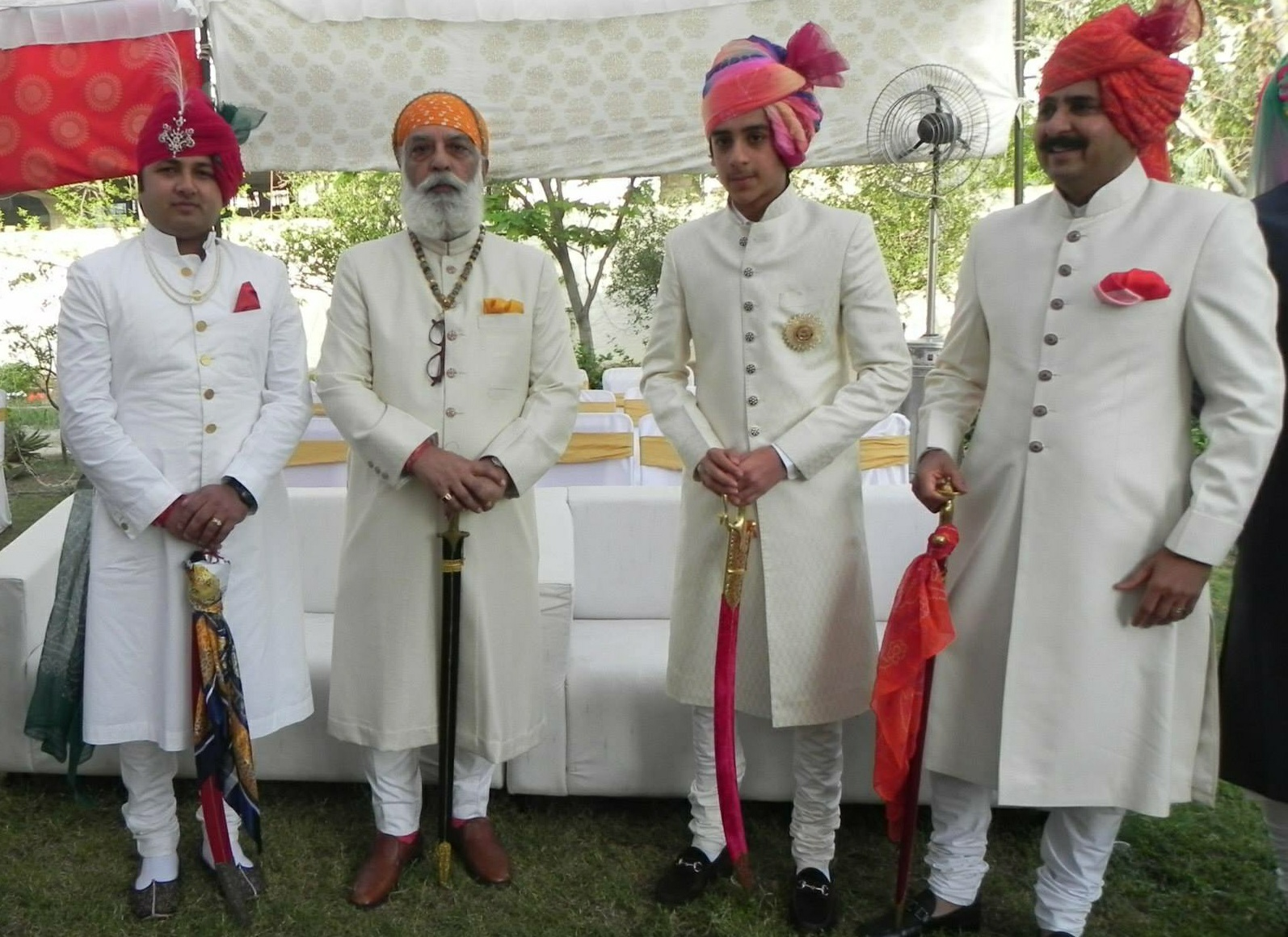
Achkan sherwani and churidar (lower body) worn by Arvind Singh Mewar and his kin during a Hindu wedding in Rajasthan, India, are items traditionally worn by the elites of the Indian subcontinent.

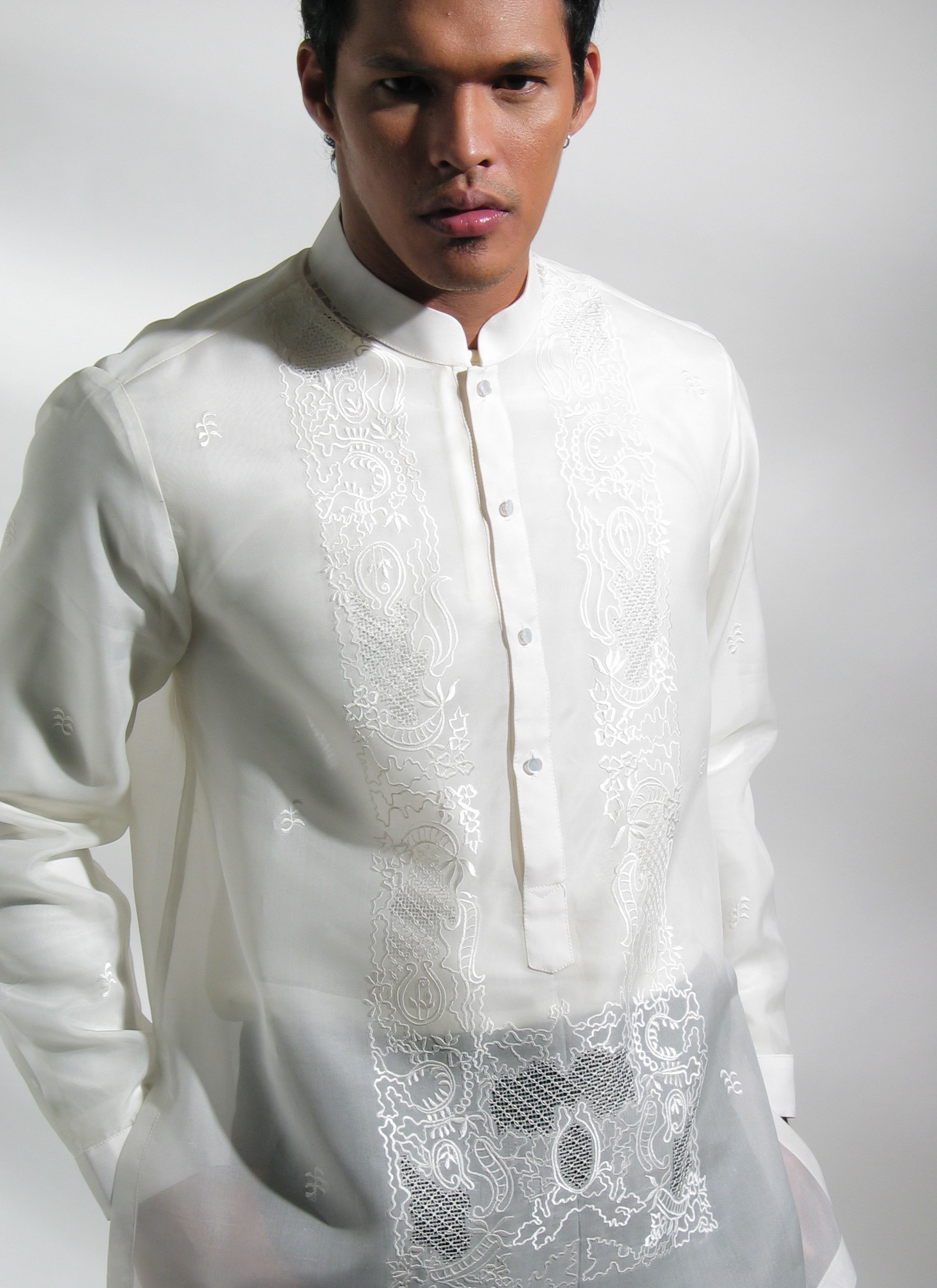
A barong tagalog made for a wedding ceremony

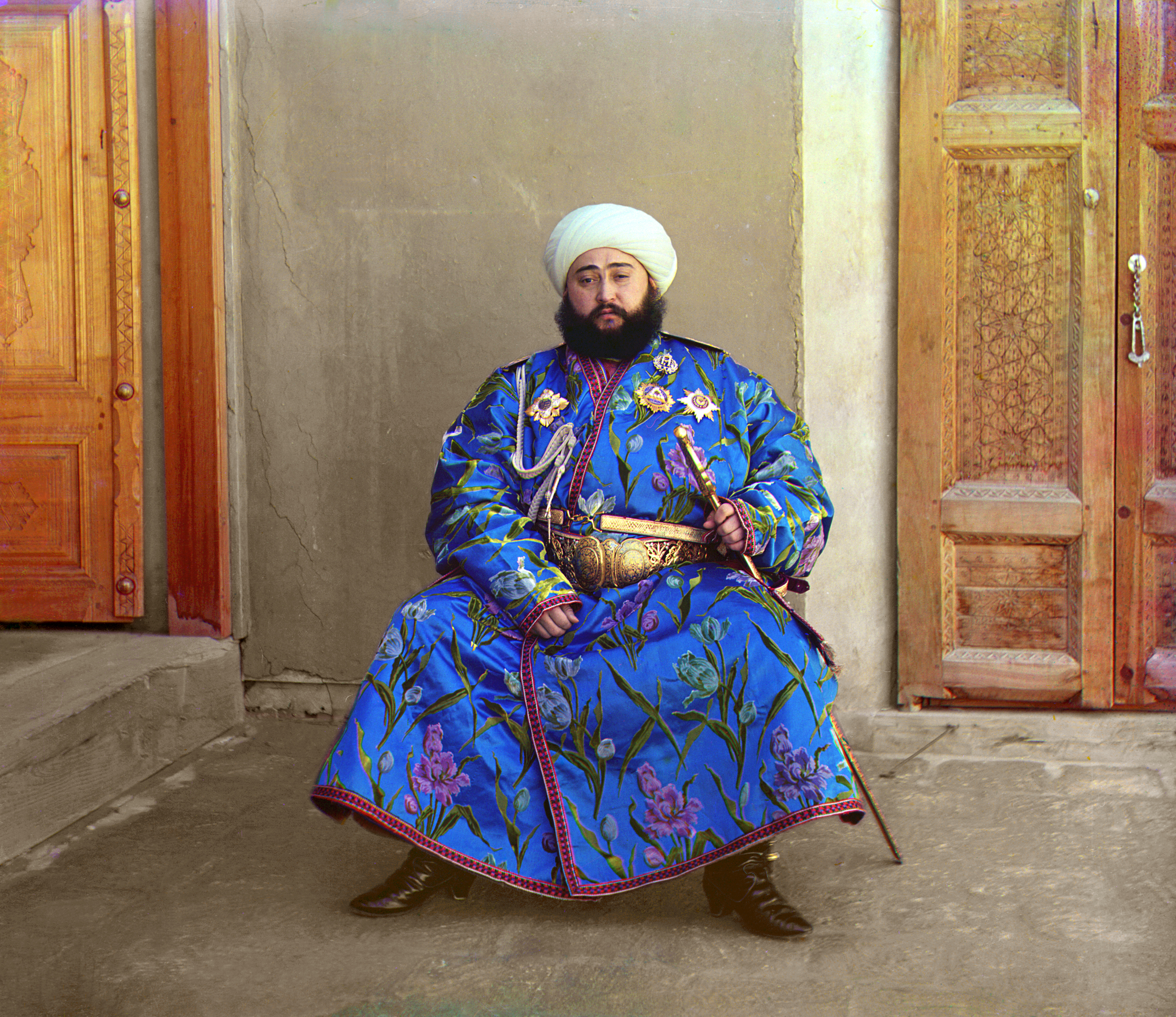
Alim Khan's bemedaled robe conveys a social message about his wealth, status, and power.

During the early modern period, individuals utilized their attire as a significant method of conveying and asserting their social status. Individuals used high-quality fabrics and trendy designs to communicate their wealth and social standing, as well as to signal their knowledge and understanding of current fashion trends to the general public. As a result, clothing played a significant role in making the social hierarchy perceptible to all members of society.

In some societies, clothing may be used to indicate rank or status. In ancient Rome, for example, only senators could wear garments dyed with Tyrian purple. In traditional Hawaiian society, only high-ranking chiefs could wear feather cloaks and palaoa, or carved whale teeth. In China, before the establishment of the republic, only the emperor could wear yellow. History provides many examples of elaborate sumptuary laws that regulated what people could wear. In societies without such laws, which include most modern societies, social status is signaled by the purchase of rare or luxury items that are limited in availability or cost to the wealthy or those of high status. In addition, peer pressure influences clothing choice.

=== Religion ===
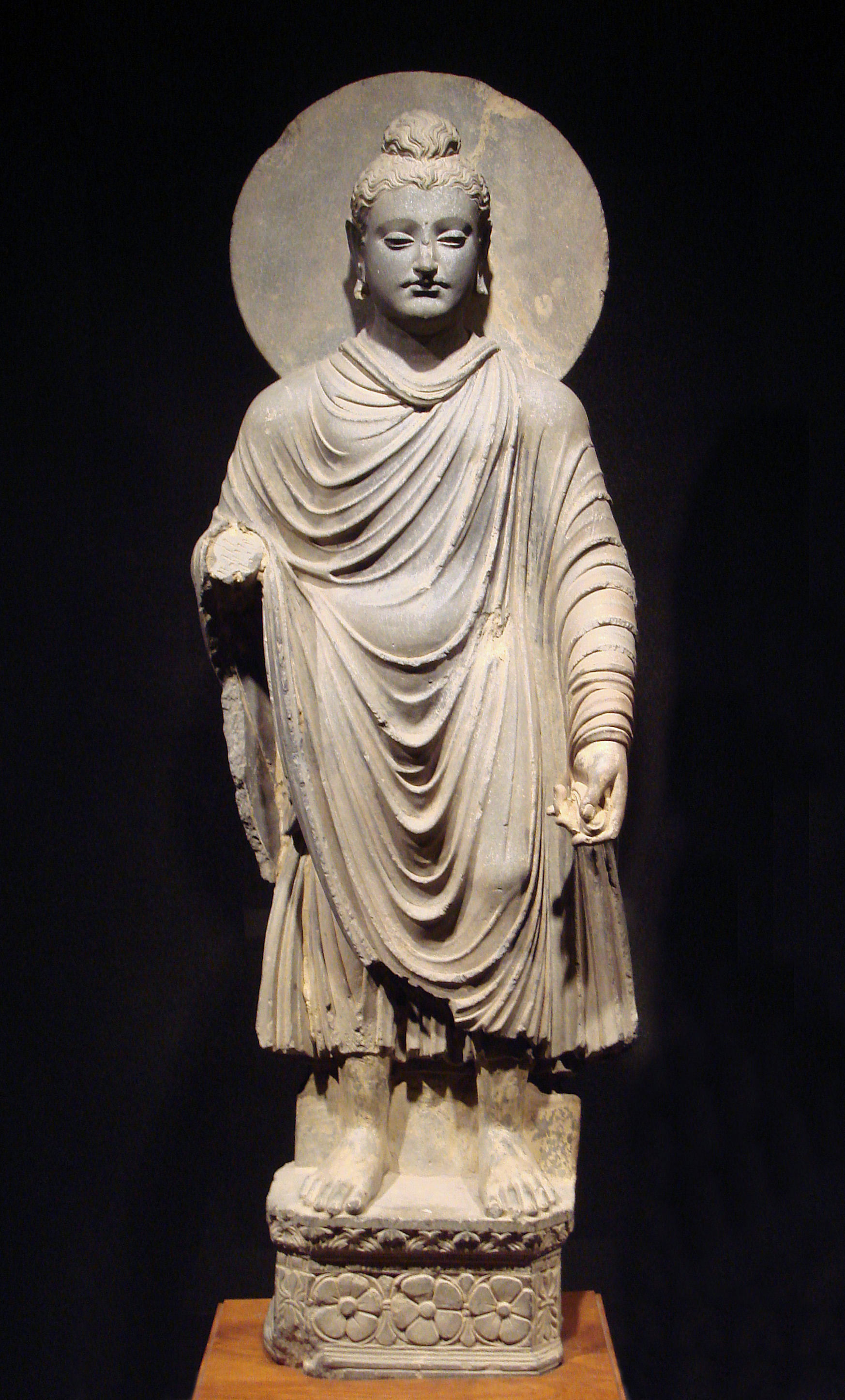
The Buddha wearing kāṣāya robes, originating from ancient India. Fully ordained Buddhist monks and nuns wore these robes.

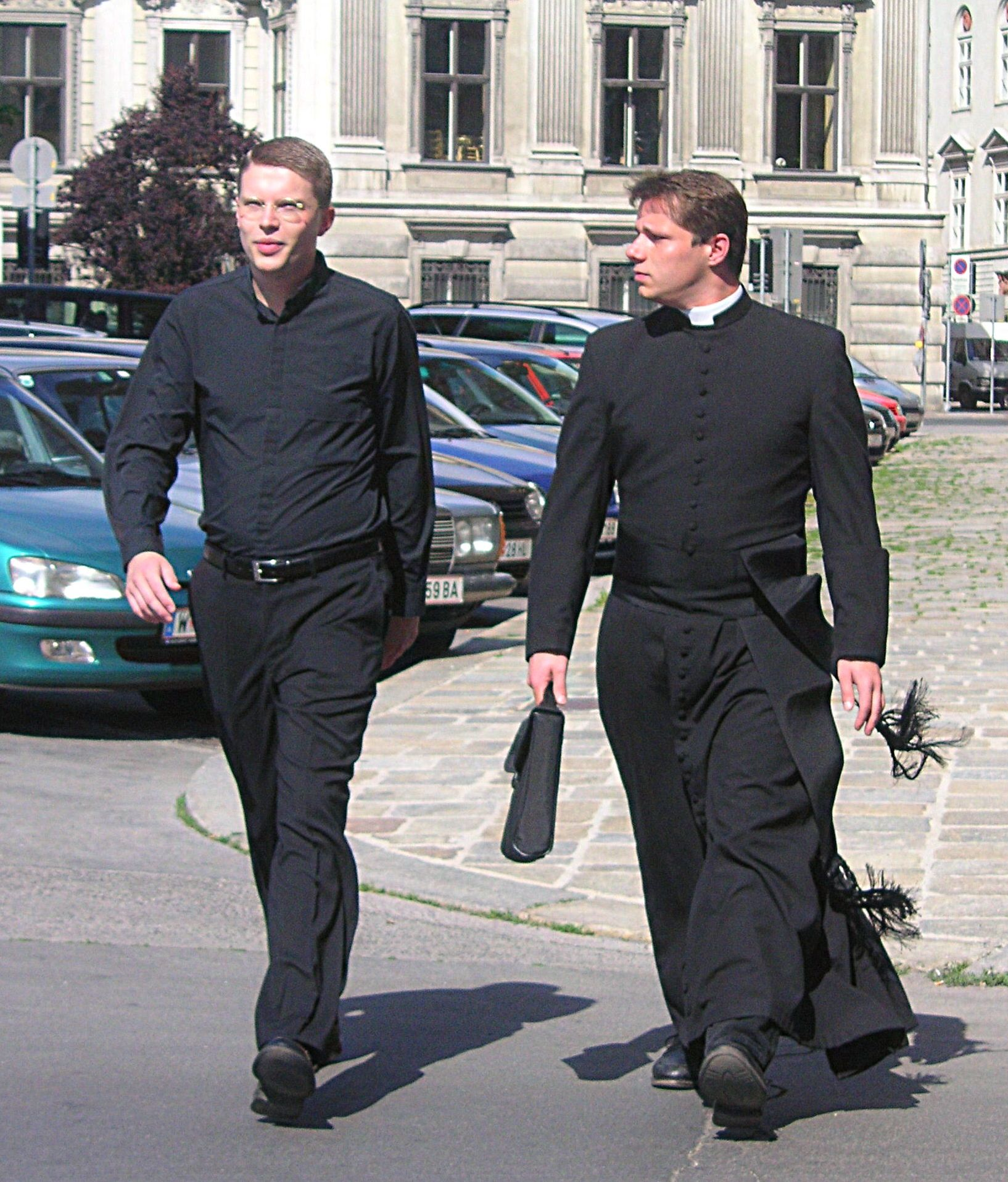
Clerical clothing worn by Catholic priests

Some religious clothing might be considered a special case of occupational clothing. Sometimes it is worn only during religious ceremonies. However, it may be worn every day as a marker for a special religious status. Sikhs wear a turban as it is a part of their religion.

In some religions, such as Hinduism, Sikhism, Buddhism, and Jainism, the cleanliness of religious dresses is of paramount importance and considered to indicate purity. Jewish ritual requires rending (tearing) of one's upper garment as a sign of mourning. The Quran says about husbands and wives, regarding clothing: "...They are clothing/covering (Libaas) for you; and you for them" (chapter 2:187). Christian clergy members wear religious vestments during liturgical services and may wear specific non-liturgical clothing at other times.

Clothing appears in numerous contexts in the Bible: prominent passages include the story of Adam and Eve, who made coverings for themselves out of fig leaves, Joseph's coat of many colors, and the clothing of Judah and Tamar, Mordecai and Esther. Jacob required his family members to change their garments as a mark of purification before they went to Bethel to build an altar. The quality of the clothing worn by Solomon and his ministers was among the features which "so amazed the Queen of Sheba that she could hardly breathe". The priests officiating in the Temple in Jerusalem wore very specific garments; the lack of them made one liable to death.

== Contemporary clothing ==
=== Western dress code ===
The Western dress code has changed over the past 500+ years. The mechanization of the textile industry made a wide variety of cloth widely available at affordable prices. Styles have changed, and the availability of synthetic fabrics has altered the definition of what is "stylish". In the latter half of the twentieth century, blue jeans became very popular and are now worn to events that normally call for formal attire. Activewear has also become a large and growing market.

Jacket by Guy Laroche, from a woman's suit with a black skirt and blouse (1960)

In the Western dress code, jeans are worn by both men and women. There are several styles of jeans, including high-rise, mid-rise, low-rise, bootcut, straight, cropped, skinny, cuffed, boyfriend, and capri.

The licensing of designer names was pioneered by designers such as Pierre Cardin, Yves Saint Laurent, and Guy Laroche in the 1960s and has been a common practice within the fashion industry from about the 1970s. Among the more popular are Marc Jacobs and Gucci, named after Marc Jacobs and Guccio Gucci, respectively.

=== Spread of Western styles ===
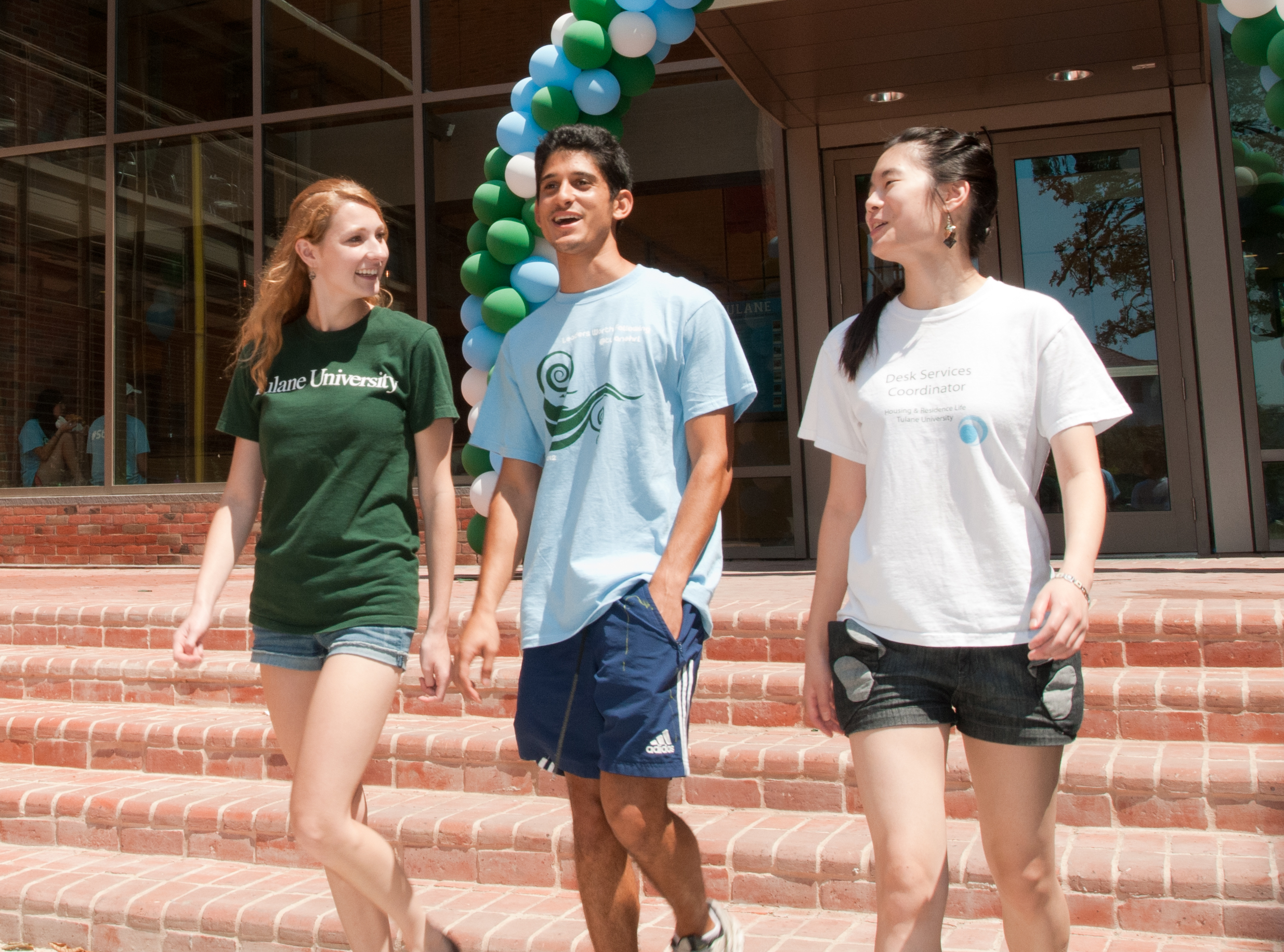
University students in casual clothes in the U.S.

By the early years of the twenty-first century, Western clothing styles had, to some extent, become international styles. This process began hundreds of years earlier, during the period of European colonialism. The process of cultural dissemination has been perpetuated over the centuries, spreading Western culture and styles, most recently through Western media corporations that have penetrated markets worldwide. Fast fashion clothing has also become a global phenomenon. These garments are less expensive, mass-produced Western clothing. Also, donated used clothing from Western countries is delivered to people in poor countries by charity organizations.

=== Ethnic and cultural heritage ===
People may wear ethnic or national dress on special occasions or in certain roles or occupations. For example, most Korean men and women have adopted Western-style dress for daily wear, but still wear traditional hanboks on special occasions, such as weddings and cultural holidays. Also, items of Western dress may be worn or accessorized in distinctive, non-Western ways. A Tongan man may combine a used T-shirt with a Tongan wrapped skirt, or tupenu.

=== Sport and activity ===
For practical, comfort, or safety reasons, most sports and physical activities are practised wearing special clothing. Common sportswear garments include shorts, T-shirts, tennis shirts, leotards, tracksuits, and trainers. Specialized garments include wetsuits (for swimming, diving, or surfing), salopettes (for skiing), and leotards (for gymnastics). Also, spandex is often used as a base layer to wick away sweat. Spandex is preferable for active sports that require form-fitting garments, such as volleyball, wrestling, track and field, dance, gymnastics, and swimming.

=== Fashion ===
Paris set the 1900–1940 fashion trends for Europe and North America. Day dresses had drop waists, sashes or belts around the low waist or hip, and a skirt that hung anywhere from the ankle up to the knee. Daywear had sleeves (long to mid-bicep) and a skirt that was straight, pleated, hemmed, or tiered. Jewelry was not conspicuous. Hair was often bobbed, giving a boyish look.

In the early twenty-first century, a diverse range of styles exists in fashion, varying by geography, exposure to modern media, and economic conditions, ranging from expensive haute couture to traditional garb to thrift store grunge. Fashion shows are events where designers showcase new and often extravagant designs.

== Political issues ==
=== Working conditions in the garments industry ===
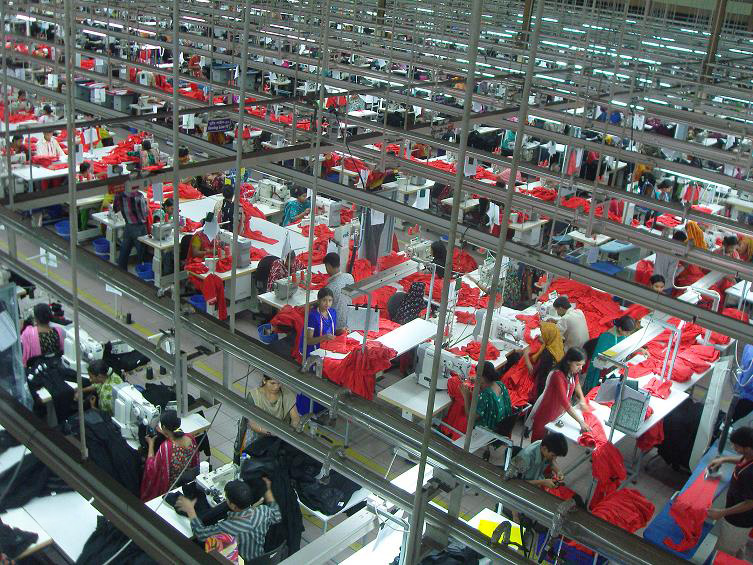
Garments factory in Bangladesh

Although mechanization transformed most aspects of the human clothing industry, by the mid-twentieth century, garment workers continued to labor under challenging conditions that demanded repetitive manual labor. Often, mass-produced clothing is made in what some consider sweatshops, typified by long work hours, lack of benefits, and lack of worker representation. While most examples of such conditions are found in developing countries, clothes made in industrialized nations may also be manufactured under similar conditions.

Coalitions of NGOs, designers (including Katharine Hamnett, American Apparel, Veja, Quiksilver, eVocal, and Edun), and campaign groups such as the Clean Clothes Campaign (CCC) and the Institute for Global Labour and Human Rights, as well as textile and clothing trade unions, have sought to improve these conditions by sponsoring awareness-raising events, which draw the attention of the media and the general public to the plight of the workers.

Outsourcing production to low-wage countries such as Bangladesh, China, India, Indonesia, Pakistan, and Sri Lanka became possible when the Multi Fibre Agreement (MFA) was abolished. The MFA, which placed quotas on textile imports, was deemed a protectionist measure. Although many countries recognize treaties such as the International Labour Organization, which attempt to set standards for worker safety and rights, many countries have made exceptions to certain parts of the treaties or failed to enforce them thoroughly. India, for example, has not ratified sections 87 and 92 of the treaty.

The production of textiles has served as a consistent industry for developing nations, providing work and wages to millions of people, whether or not it is construed as exploitative.

=== Fur ===
The use of animal fur in clothing dates to prehistoric times. Currently, although fur is still used by indigenous people in Arctic regions and at higher elevations for its warmth and protection, in developed countries it is associated with expensive designer clothing. Once uncontroversial, it has recently been the focus of campaigns because campaigners consider it cruel and unnecessary. PETA and other animal and animal liberation groups have called attention to fur farming and other practices they consider cruel.

Real fur in fashion is contentious, with Copenhagen (2022) and London (2018) fashion weeks banning real fur in their runway shows following protests and government attention to the issue. Fashion houses such as Gucci and Chanel have banned the use of fur in their garments. Versace and Furla also stopped using fur in their collections in early 2018. In 2020, the outdoor brand Canada Goose announced it would discontinue the use of new coyote fur on parka trims following protests.

Governing bodies have enacted legislation banning the sale of new real-fur garments. In 2021, Israel was the first government to ban the sale of real fur garments, except for those worn as part of a religious practice. In 2019, the US state of California banned fur trapping, with a total ban on the sale of all new fur garments except those made of sheep, cow, and rabbit fur going into effect on 1 January 2023.

== Life cycle ==
=== Clothing maintenance ===
Clothing suffers assault both from within and without. The human body sheds skin cells and oils and excretes sweat, urine, and feces, which may soil clothing. From the outside, sun damage, moisture, abrasion, and dirt assault garments. Fleas and lice can hide in seams. If not cleaned and refurbished, clothing becomes worn. It loses its aesthetics and functionality (as when buttons fall off, seams come undone, fabrics thin or tear, and zippers fail).

Often, people wear an item of clothing until it falls apart. Some materials present problems. Cleaning leather is difficult, and bark cloth (tapa) cannot be washed without dissolving it. Owners may patch tears and rips, and brush off surface dirt, but materials such as these inevitably age.

Most clothing consists of cloth, however, and most cloth can be laundered and mended (patching, darning, but compare felt).

=== Laundry, ironing, storage ===
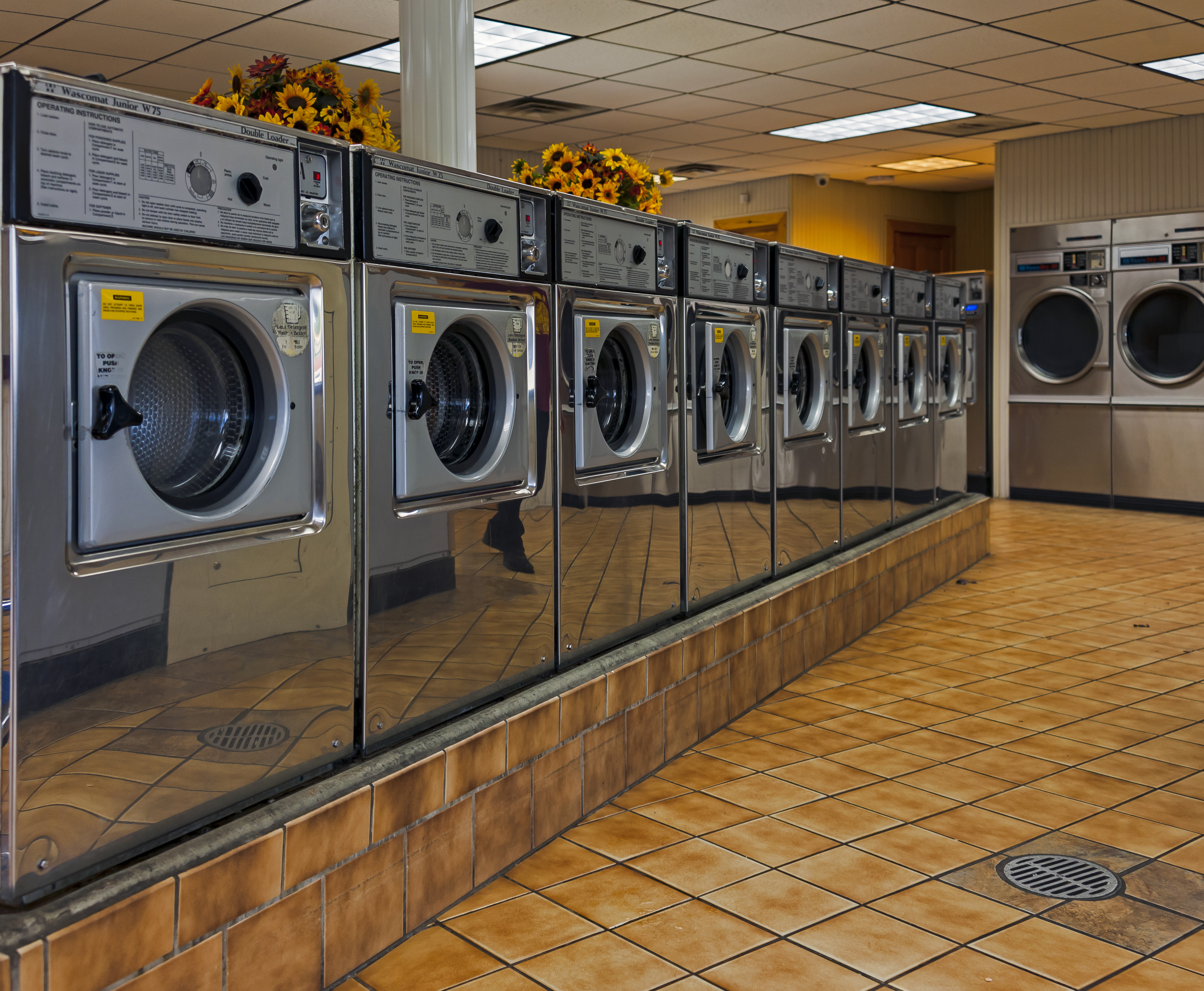
Laundromat in Walden, New York, United States

Humans have developed many specialized methods for laundering clothing, ranging from early methods of pounding clothes against rocks in running streams, to the latest in electronic washing machines and dry cleaning (dissolving dirt in solvents other than water). Hot water washing (boiling), chemical cleaning, and ironing are all traditional methods of sterilizing fabrics for hygiene purposes.

Many kinds of clothing are designed to be ironed before they are worn to remove wrinkles. Most modern formal and semi-formal clothing is in this category (for example, dress shirts and suits). Ironed clothes are believed to look clean, fresh, and neat. Much contemporary casual clothing is made of knit materials that do not readily wrinkle and do not require ironing. Some clothing is permanent press, having been treated with a coating (such as polytetrafluoroethylene) that suppresses wrinkles and creates a smooth appearance without ironing. Excess lint or debris may end up on the clothing between launderings. In such cases, a lint remover may be useful.

Once clothes have been laundered and possibly ironed, they are usually hung on clothes hangers or folded, in order to keep them fresh until they are worn. Clothes are folded to allow them to be stored compactly, to prevent creasing, to preserve creases, or to present them more pleasingly, for instance, when they are put on sale in stores.

Certain types of insects and larvae feed on clothing and textiles, such as the black carpet beetle and clothing moths. To deter such pests, clothes may be stored in cedar-lined closets or chests, or placed in drawers or containers with materials having pest repellent properties, such as lavender or mothballs. Airtight containers (such as sealed, heavy-duty plastic bags) may also deter insect pests from damaging clothing materials.

=== Non-iron ===
A resin used to make non-wrinkle shirts releases formaldehyde, which can cause contact dermatitis in some people; no disclosure requirements exist, and in 2008, the U.S. Government Accountability Office tested clothing for formaldehyde and found that the highest levels generally occurred in non-wrinkle shirts and pants. In 1999, a study of the effect of washing on the formaldehyde levels found that after six months of routine washing, 7 of 27 shirts still had levels in excess of 75 ppm (the safe limit for direct skin exposure).

=== Mending ===
When the raw material – cloth – was worth more than labor, it made sense to expend labor in saving it. In past times, mending was an art. A meticulous tailor or seamstress could mend rips with thread raveled from hems and seam edges so skillfully that the tear was practically invisible. Today, clothing is considered a consumable item. Mass-manufactured clothing is less expensive than the labor required to repair it. Many people buy a new piece of clothing rather than spend time mending. The thrifty still replace zippers and buttons and sew up ripped hems, however. Other mending techniques include darning and invisible mending or upcycling through visible mending inspired by Japanese Sashiko.

=== Recycling ===
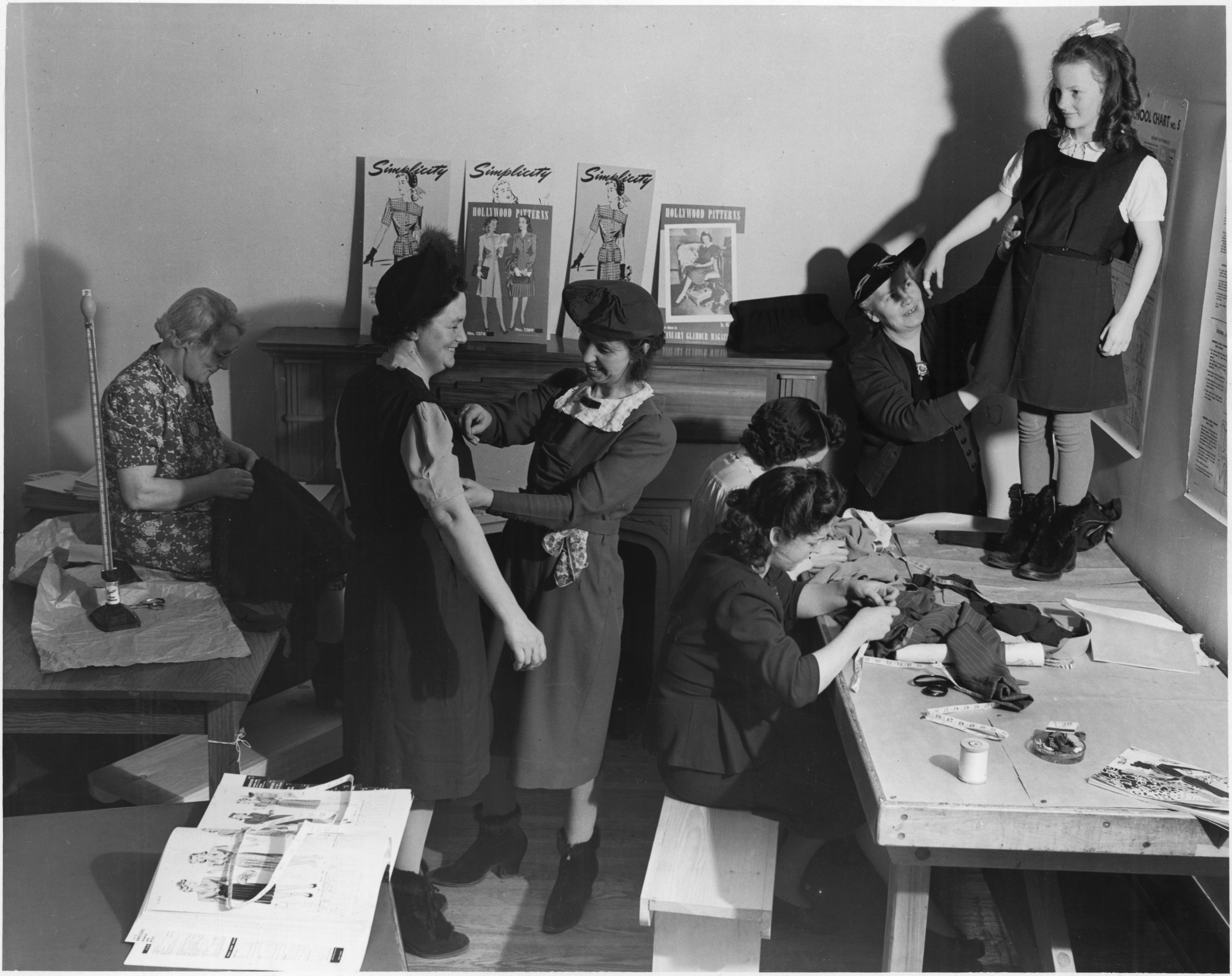
Clothing salvage centre at the General Engineering Company (Canada) munitions factory during the Second World War

It is estimated that 80-150 billion garments are produced annually. Used, unwearable clothing can be repurposed for quilts, rags, rugs, bandages, and many other household uses. Neutral colored or undyed cellulose fibers can be recycled into paper. In Western societies, used clothing is often thrown out or donated to charity (such as through a clothing bin). It is also sold to consignment shops, dress agencies, flea markets, and in online auctions. Also, used clothing is often collected on an industrial scale for sorting and shipment to poorer countries for reuse. Globally, used clothing is worth $4 billion, with the U.S. the leading exporter at $575 million.

Synthetics, which come primarily from petrochemicals, are not renewable or biodegradable.

Excess clothing inventory is sometimes destroyed to preserve brand value.

== Global trade ==
EU member states imported €166 billion of clothes in 2018; 51% came from outside the EU (€84 billion). EU member states exported €116 billion of clothes in 2018, including 77% to other EU member states.

According to the World Trade Organization (WTO) report, the value of global clothing exports in 2022 reached US$790.1 billion, up 10.6% from 2021. China is the world's largest clothing exporter, with exports valued at US$178.4 billion, accounting for 22.6% of the global market share. Next are Bangladesh (US$40.8 billion), Vietnam (US$39.8 billion), India (US$36.1 billion), and Turkey (US$29.7 billion).

In Vietnam, clothing exports continue to be one of the leading export sectors, contributing significantly to the export turnover and economic growth of the country. According to the General Department of Customs of Vietnam, the value of Vietnam's clothing exports in 2022 reached US$39.8 billion, up 14.2% from 2021. Of which, clothing exports to the United States reached US$18.8 billion, accounting for 47.3% of the market share; exports to the EU reached US$9.8 billion, accounting for 24.6% of the market share.

== See also ==
- Children's clothing
- Clothing fetish
- Clothing laws by country
- Cotton recycling
- Global trade of secondhand clothing
- Higg Index
- List of individual dresses
- Nudity
- Organic cotton
- Reconstructed clothing
- Right to clothing
- Sustainable fashion
- Textile recycling
- Vintage clothing
- Zero-waste fashion
