= Clothing bin =

Type of container used for donating clothing

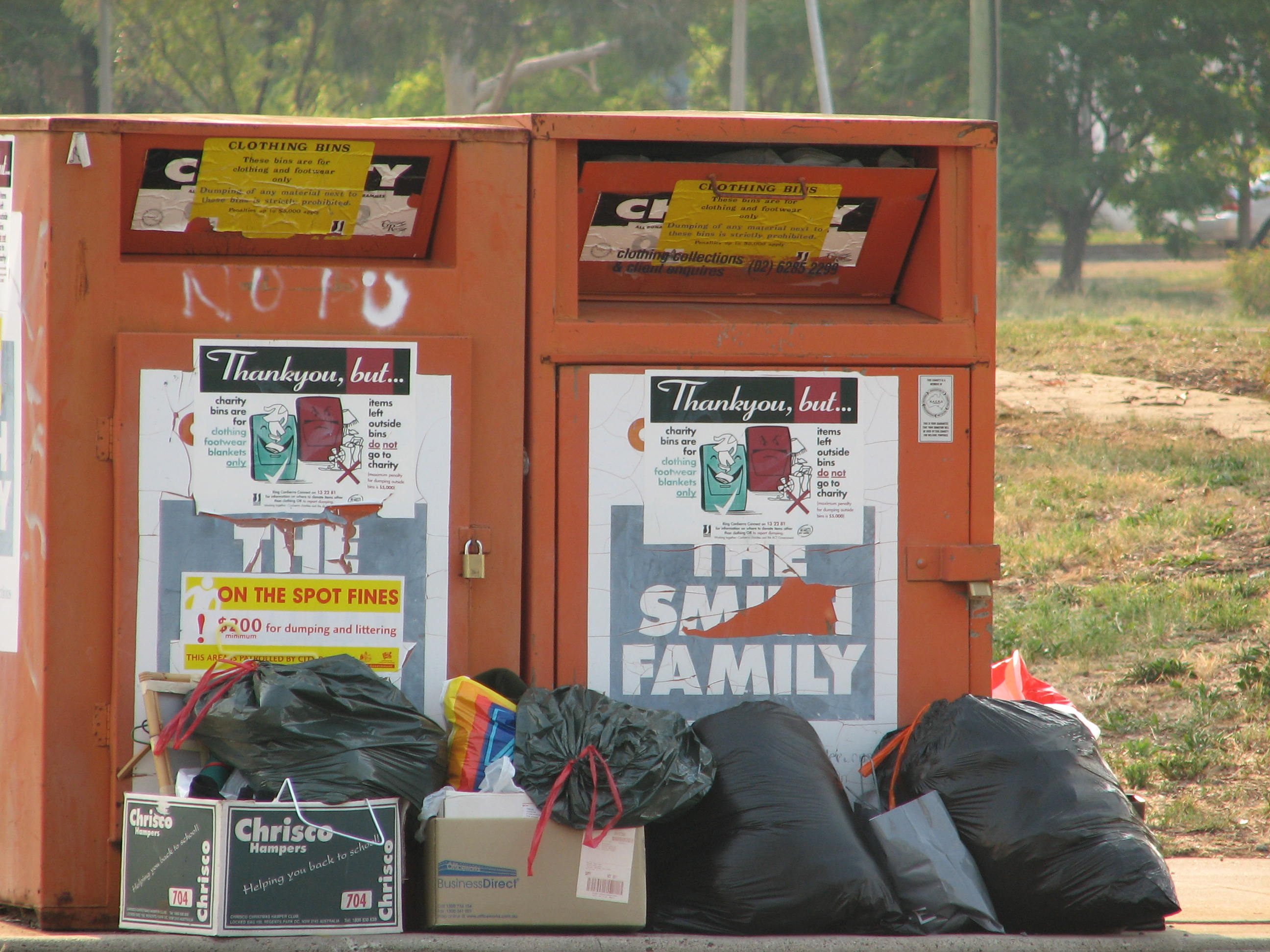
Smith Family clothing bins at the Duffy shopping centre in Canberra, Australia.

A clothing bin is a container in which clothing is placed to be donated to charity organizations (e.g., the Salvation Army or The Smith Family) or for recycling in other ways. They can be provided by local authorities or the charities themselves but sometimes only bear the name of a charity through a licensing or revenue sharing agreement. The majority of clothing bins in Chicago, for instance, are for-profit. In 2015, a collection company in Yonkers was fined $700,000 for not disclosing the for-profit nature of their bin.

In South Korea, the nonprofit organization OTCAN was founded in 2009 partly in response to a view that the country's street-side clothing bins were largely commercial rather than charitable; it instead collects donated clothing directly from households for redistribution.

Bins are often vandalized or filled with unsuitable materials (including rubbish). These are costly for the organizations concerned to dispose of, and this misuse has at times led to bins being withdrawn. On-the-spot fines are often threatened through signs on the bins. In 2022, authorities in Sydney, Australia reported that they had so far collected $70,750 in fines from a single bin in Bondi Beach. A woman in Stourport, United Kingdom was fined £400 for leaving bags outside a bin which did not have a warning sign but had her fine changed to a caution after she appealed.

Homeless people have been known to climb into donation bins for shelter or to retrieve items but the most common bin design makes this dangerous. Often such bins have a anti-stealing mechanism which prevents users from retrieving items from the bin through the opening intended for depositing. Instead a locked service door is used for retrieving the items by the respective organization. Eight such deaths were recorded in Canada between 2015 and 2019 and "easily a dozen" occurred in the United States over the preceding decade.

== See also ==
- Hamper
