= OTCAN =

South Korean nonprofit organization

- 옷캔
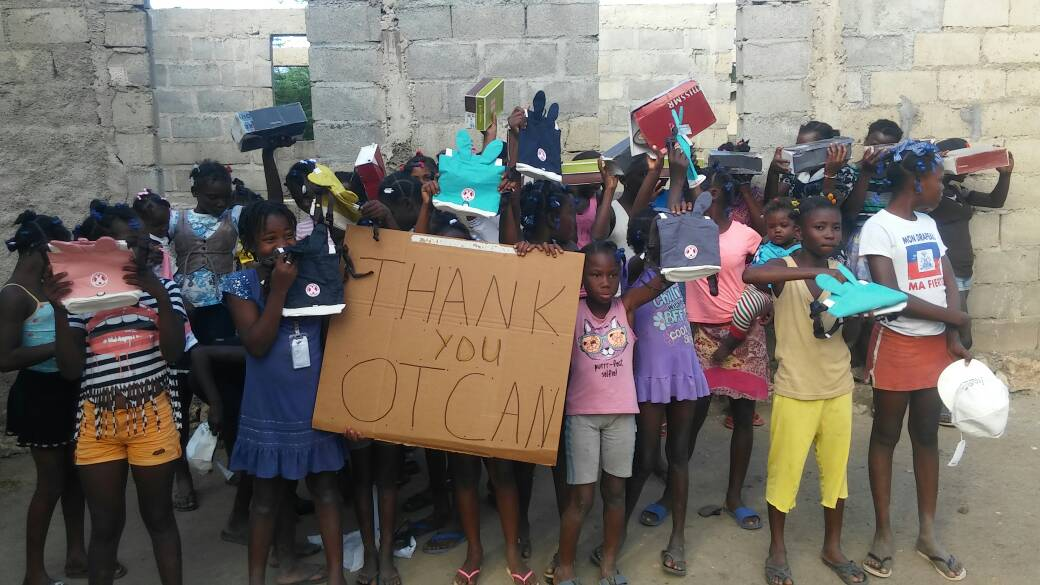
- Children in Haiti with clothing donated through OTCAN, 2018
- Formation: 2009
- Founder: Cho Yun-chan
- Type: Nonprofit
- Headquarters: Jung-gu, Daejeon, South Korea
- Website: otcan.org

OTCAN (Korean: 옷캔) is a South Korean nonprofit organization based in Daejeon that collects used clothing and footwear donated by households and companies and redistributes them in South Korea and abroad. It was founded in 2009 by Cho Yun-chan, and its name joins the Korean word for clothes (옷, ot) with the English word "can".

== History ==
Cho Yun-chan, a Daejeon-based web designer, became interested in clothing donation after volunteering in Ghana in the mid-2000s. There, he saw secondhand Korean clothing being resold at prices many local families could not afford. He came to regard South Korea's street-side clothing bins as a largely commercial operation rather than a charitable one, and started an online awareness campaign before founding OTCAN in 2009 as a nonprofit clothing-redistribution group. It was registered as a nonprofit organization under South Korea's Ministry of Environment.

A 2011 Yonhap feature said OTCAN was collecting about one ton of used clothing a week from households nationwide. The group sold the clothing through overseas secondhand markets and used the annual proceeds of about 40 million won for children's programs in Africa and Asia. Kyunghyang Shinmun later put its collection volume at about 20 tons in 2009 and roughly 180 tons in 2012.

== Activities ==
OTCAN uses a mail-in donation system rather than street-side bins. Donors apply online and send boxed clothing by courier. After sorting donations in Daejeon, the organization either distributes usable clothing, footwear and household textiles in South Korea or sells them in overseas secondhand markets. Proceeds from overseas sales are used for children's welfare and education programs in recipient countries. A 2017 Hankyung article reported that, according to OTCAN, about 275,000 people had taken part in its clothing donations between 2009 and 2016, and that the organization received about 270 tons of clothing in 2016 alone; the goods were sent to countries including Ethiopia and Djibouti. By 2021 it had made about 250 shipments to recipients in eleven countries, and a 2024 profile reported that its annual intake had grown to more than 300 tons.

OTCAN also distributes goods within South Korea; in January 2024 it donated about 400 cold-weather items, worth about 4 million won, to the Daejeon Social Service Agency for distribution to six community-based elderly-care service organizations. It has handled corporate product donations as well, including a 2023 donation of footwear from the retailer ABC-Mart valued at about 200 million won, which was distributed to recipients in 24 countries.

In 2018, OTCAN introduced a volunteer certification program to increase participation by teenagers; participants select, sort, and pack clothing for donation before sending it to the organization. Those who meet the program's requirements can have their volunteer hours recognized through South Korea's 1365 Volunteer Portal. In 2020, employees and insurance agents of Tongyang Life Insurance collected clothing for OTCAN as a remote volunteering activity, after the COVID-19 pandemic had made in-person volunteering difficult.

== See also ==
- Textile recycling
- Clothing swap
