= Visible mending =

Repairing in a deliberately visible way

Visible mending is a form of repair work, usually on textile items, that is deliberately left visible (compare to invisible mending). The dual goals of this practice are to adorn the item, and to attract attention to the fact it has been mended in some way. The latter is often a statement of critique on the consumerist idea of replacing broken items with new ones without trying to bring them back to full functionality. In other words, the repair is supposed to be a new and distinct feature of the item.

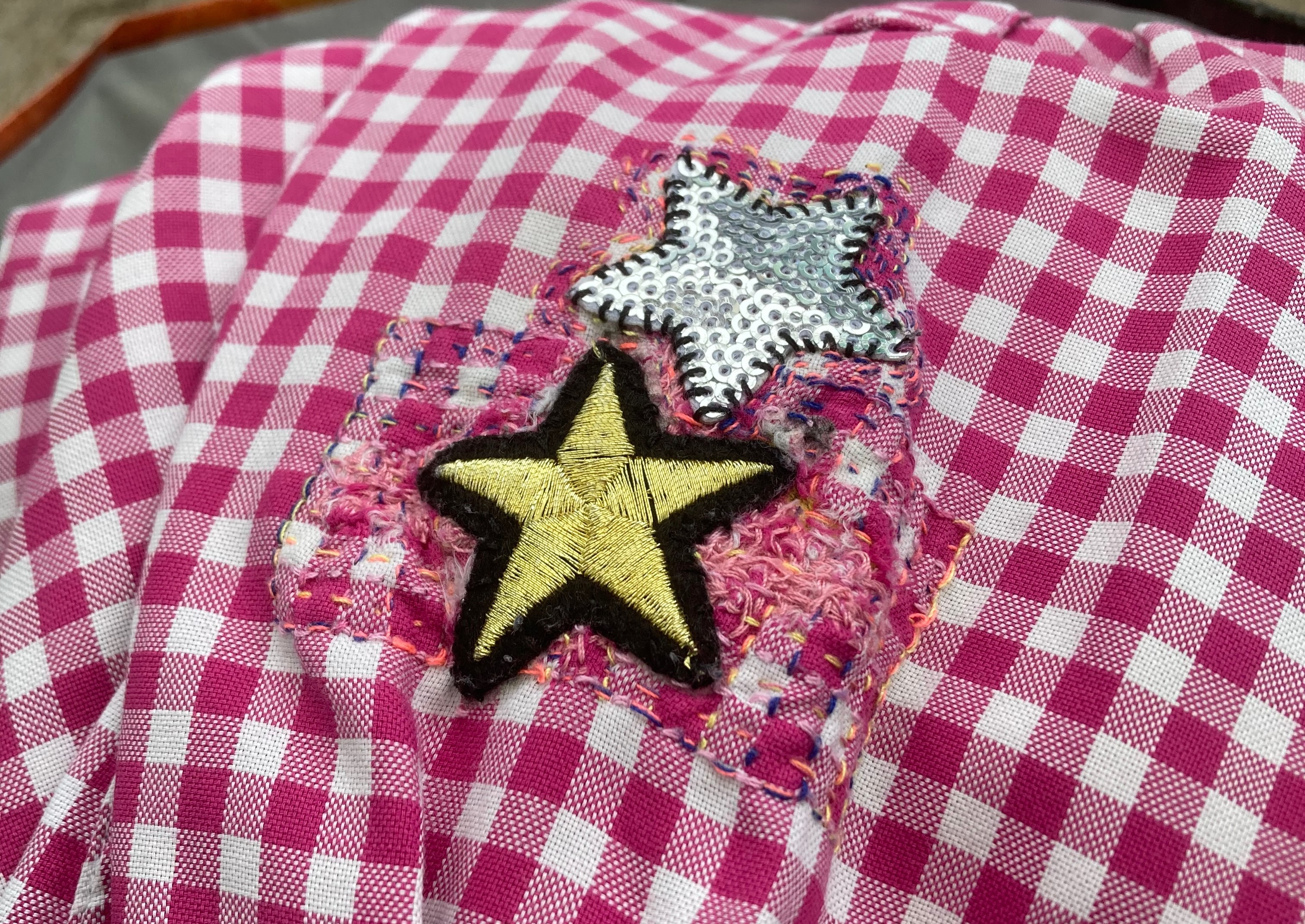
Visibly mended textile item; visible are sashiko embroidery, a sequinned iron-on patch and additional fabric.

== Methods and materials ==
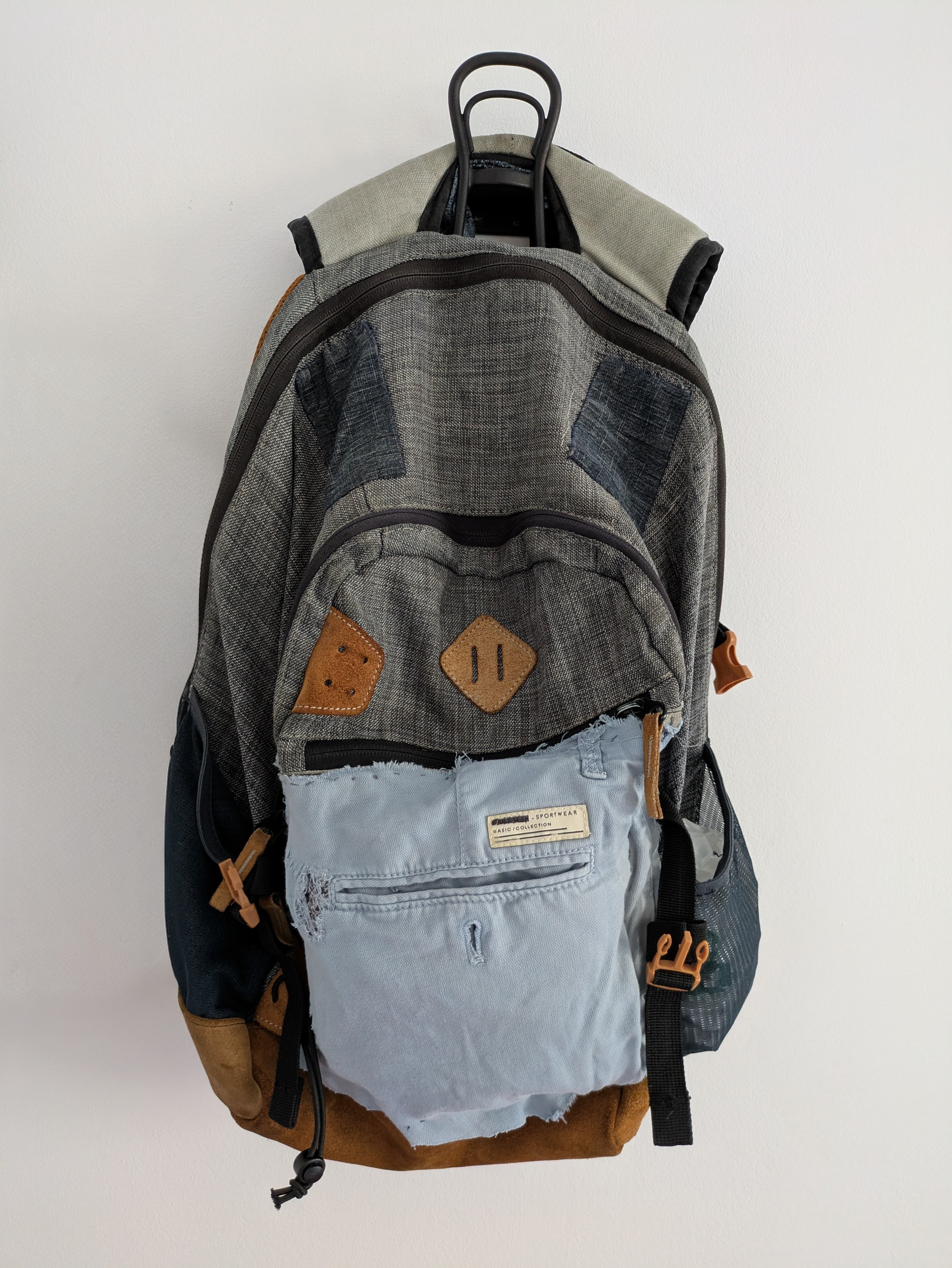
Backpack visibly mended with multiple materials

Visible mending is a practice of repairing the item in a non-traditional way, which means that less importance is placed on simplicity and speed of the repair work and more on the decorative aspect. Popular methods of visible mending are:

- embroidery
- patching with contrasting fabrics or textile waste, such as clothing tags or ribbon scraps
- patching using two kind of textiles, for example lace and woven fabric put one on top of the other
- using iron-on patches
- knitting
- weaving
- crochet
- beaded embroidery
- dyeing
- darning
- cross-stitching

Those methods are frequently used simultaneously, for example a patch might be stitched on a tear using embroidery and adding sequins on top of it.

The patching materials are usually stitched onto the mended area using a hand sewing needle or a sewing machine. Embroidery hoops are often used to keep the mended fabric area appropriately tense and allow the mender to more easily stitch on the repairing materials without causing wrinkling or puckering. Other widely used item is a darning egg; a device that allows to stretch the mended area (typically the heel of a sock) onto a circular shape and prevent shape deformity

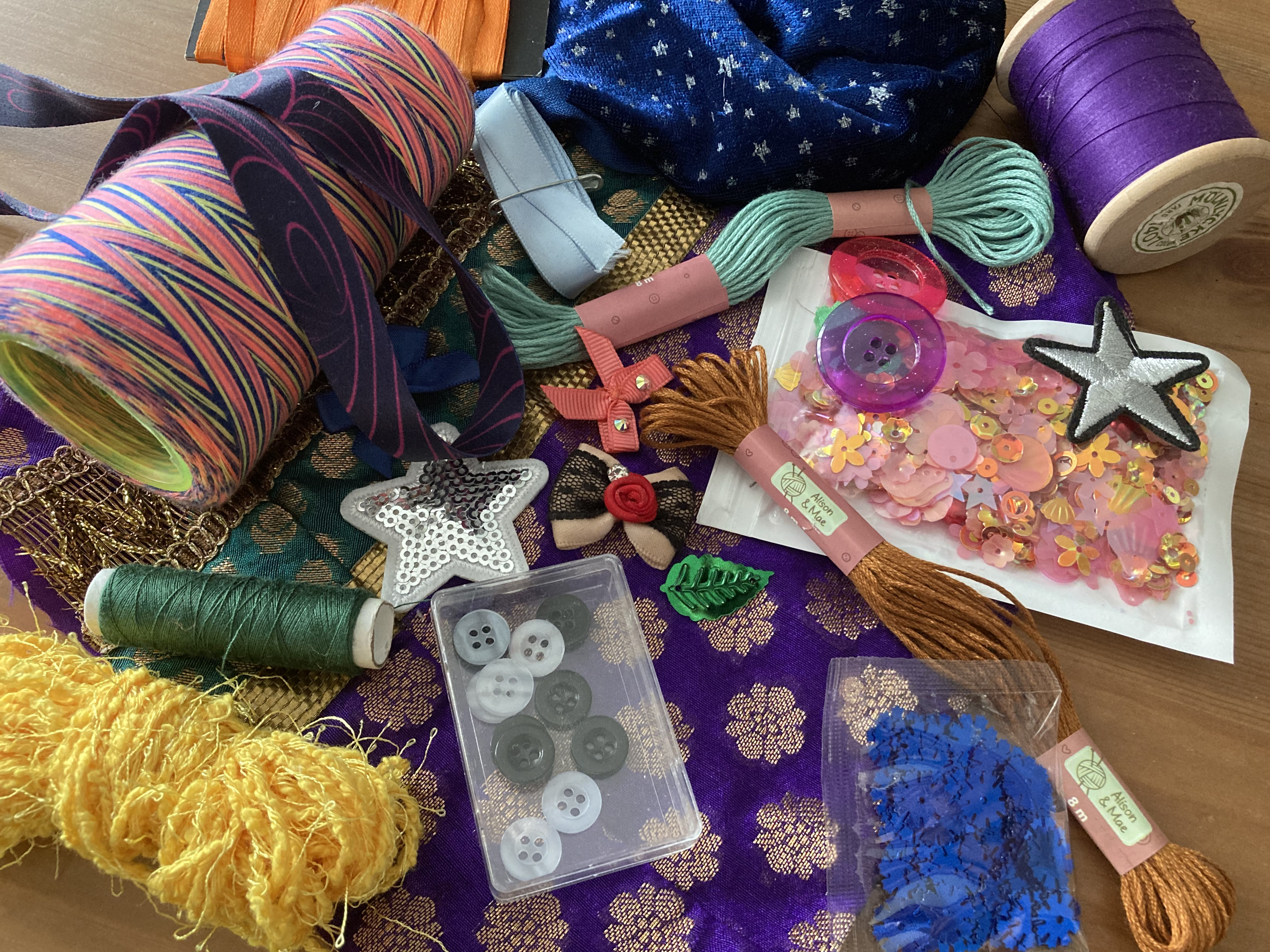
Selection of haberdashery items used for visible mending: buttons, sequins, beads, embroidery floss, ribbons, fabric scraps, ready-made patches and bows, sewing thread, fantasy yarn.

Kinds of materials used to visibly mend include:

- assorted fabric waste (textile scraps, clothing tags, ribbon scraps, torn-off pockets etc.)
- thread, embroidery floss, yarn
- darning wool
- ready-made patches, sew-on or iron-on
- beads, sequins, buttons
- textile repair tape
- interfacing

As the practice has been garnering the attention of crafting communities, many tutorials are available online; some stores have experienced rise of the haberdashery items sales due to the growing popularity of the visible mending. Per the press office of the John Lewis department store, which attributes the sales trends to the popularity of the practice:

the department store chain said it had sold out of darning needles and that sales of darning wool had doubled year-on-year [2022 to 2023], while sales of repair products such as patches and repair tape were up 61 percent.

== Social and historical aspects ==
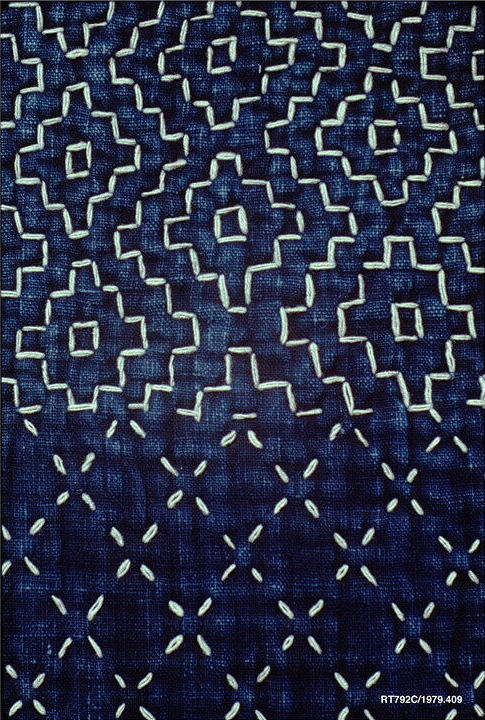
Sashiko stitching

=== History and varieties ===
Many argue that the current revival of what is contemporarily called visible mending is a cultural rediscovery of practices which date back centuries. For example, kantha is a Bengali tradition in which well-worn garments are patched in layers by sewing those on with a running stitch, while Biharian practice of kheta is a form of geometrical repair-quilting. Boro, a seam reinforcing technique began to be used in Japan in the Edo period by women from poor, rural communities, who tried to extend the life of clothing and bed linen. Thanks to this, clothes became not only more durable, but also warmer. More widely known sashiko is a more decorative form of boro, and is characterized by geometric patterns. These elements include fish scales, diamonds, mountains, bamboo, leaves, arrows, pampas grass, and shippo-tsunagi (a pattern consisting of interlocking geometric shapes symbolizing the "seven treasures"). However, sashiko was used not only for mending, but also just for beautifying the textile item.

Decorative darning was widely used in the western cultures since early 18th century; many darning samplers survived, displaying a variety of stitches which were supposed to repair the garment by decorating it; all of the samplers feature contrasting thread on usually white or beige fabric. According to some historians, most darning samplers were made by girls in their early teens as a way to advertise her domestic skills. Contemporary newspaper advertisements called for maids who had experience in darning and garment mending in general, as lack of these abilities would mean the necessity of sending the garments out for repair.

The 1943 pamphlet Make Do and Mend, issued by the British Ministry of Information, was an aide for the housewives who had to deal with the rationing of textiles due to the war effort, and described various methods of repairing and maintenance of the clothing. The booklet contained several tips for using visible mending to save the existing garments from being demoted to rags, such as: "A woman's woolly jumper, or silk blouse or a frock that has a lot of small holes [...] can be repaired decoratively by embroidering small flowers or other designs". An entire part of the pamphlet is exclusively devoted to decorative patching:

When you can't get a patch to match the cloth, make your mend as decorative as possible. Apply the patch on the right side of the cloth with some fancy stitching, such as feather-stitch, herring-bone or buttonhole, and let the patch be a sharp colour-contrast to the original material. Give it a fancy shape; for instance, you can hide a worn elbow with a diamond or heart-shaped patch, and add a pocket of the same material on the bodice or the skirt, to make it look intentional.

In People's Republic of Poland (and, arguedly, other countries in the Soviet sphere of influence) many booklets with similar advice were published as a way to help citizens prolong their clothing's lives amongst the struggles of the reality of coupon rationing. A journalist from a popular magazine Moda i Życie Praktyczne (Fashion and Practical Life) stated that "the alterations [of the clothing] were so beautiful in the harmonious combinations of colours, seams, sew-ons, fasteners and lacing that one suspects that fashionistas are ready to make new dresses look like they were altered." In Przekrój, a popular Polish lifestyle magazine, two imaginary friends—Lucynka and Paulinka—were regularly having discussions about how one should visibly mend clothes so that they look fashionable and chic.

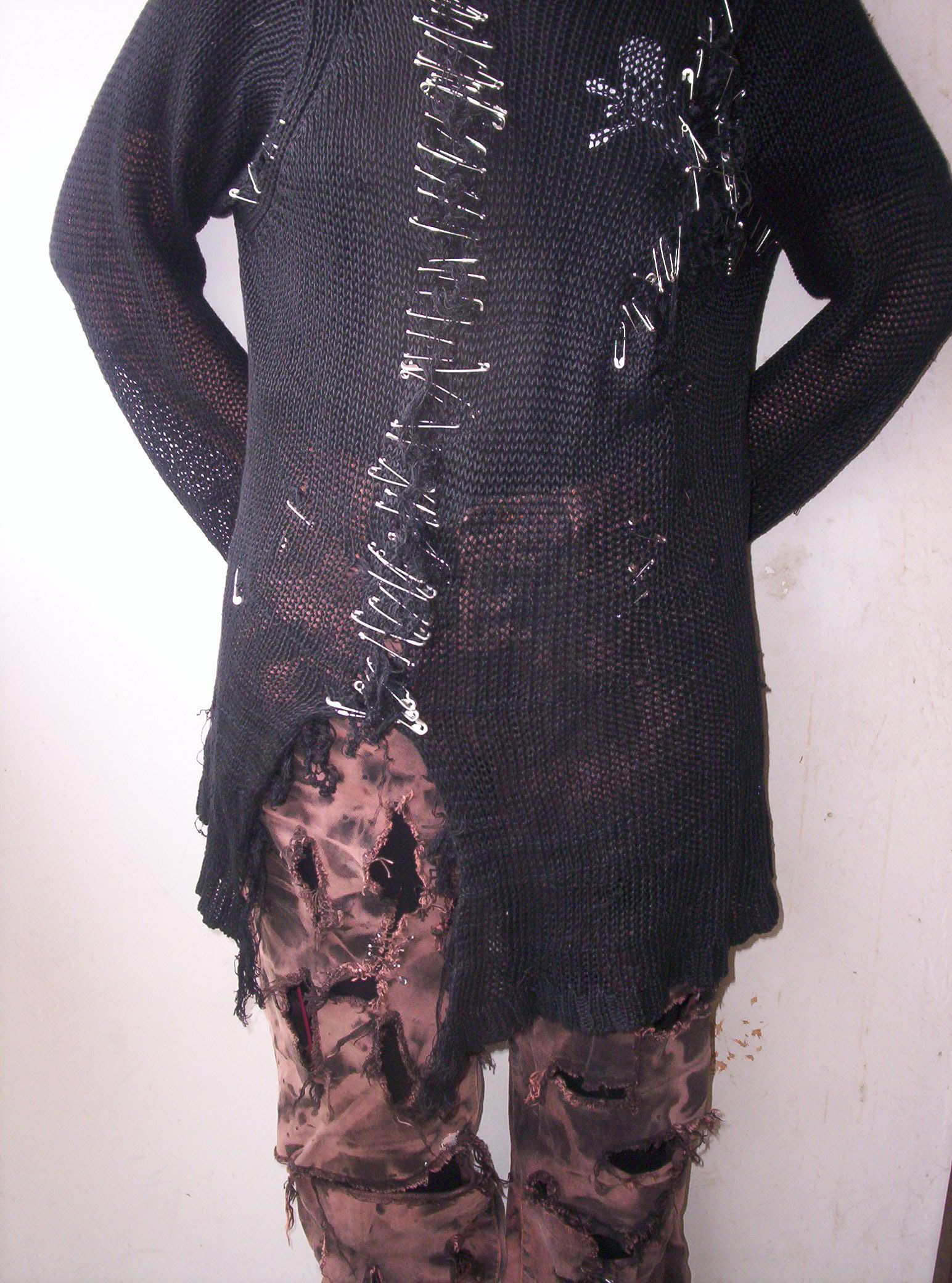
A deliberately torn jumper held together using a plethora of safety pins.

Some argue that visible mending (understood as making whatever effort to close a rip in a clothing item) experienced a modern revival in the 1970's, as Vivienne Westwood shone a spotlight onto the practice by decorating her punk designs with patches tacked on or pinned on with safety pins, or even just using safety pins to hold together tears in the fabric. In the realms of punk and grunge culture, intentionally ripped clothing became a rebellious fashion statement, symbolizing a vocal protest against societal norms and the limited opportunities available to young individuals. The garments were often put back together using various methods to further bring attention to the fact that the item of clothing has been damaged somehow, and the flaw is not hidden, but openly displayed. Westwood herself pleaded with the community: "Buy less. Choose well. Make it last."

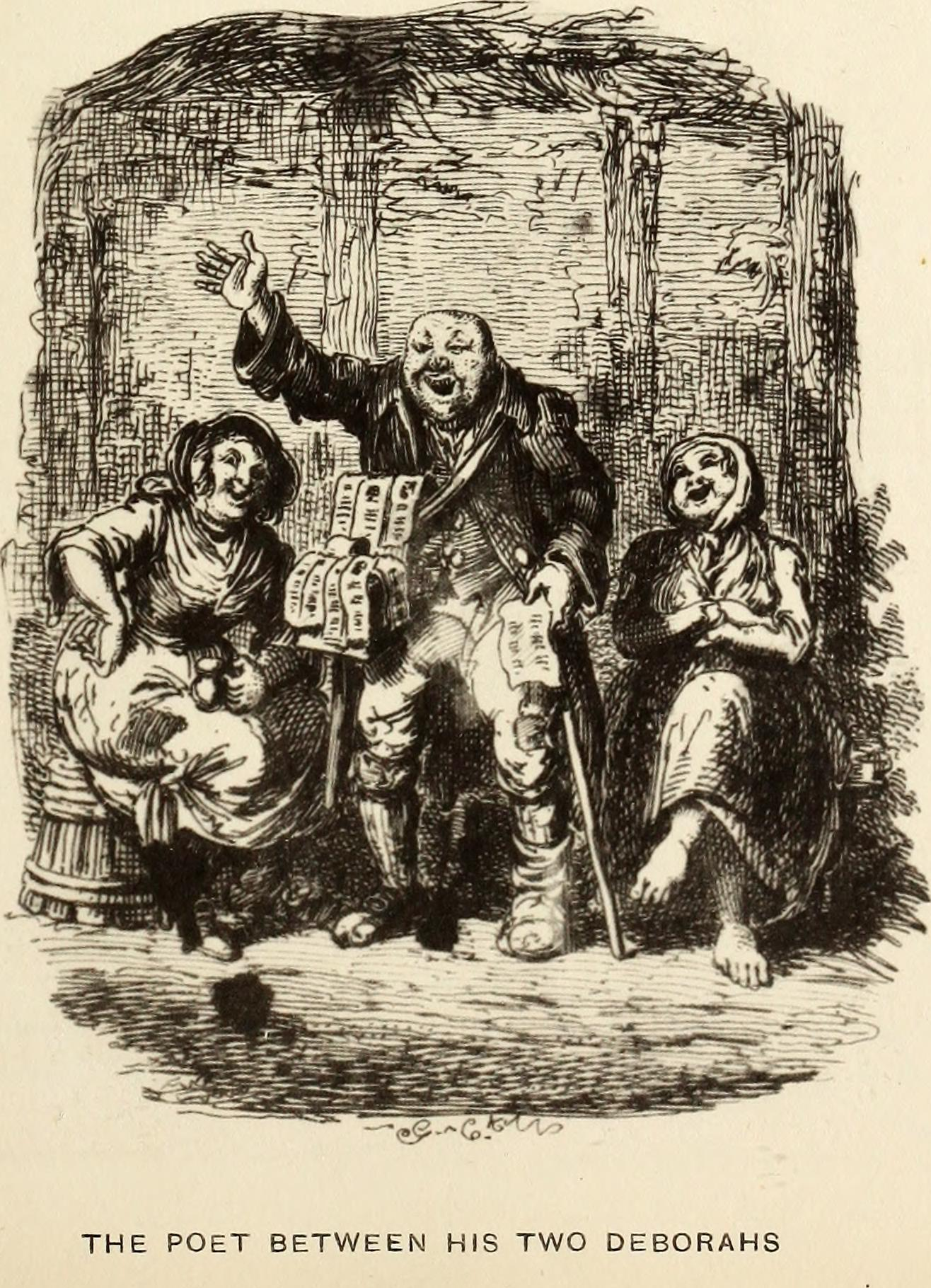
A cartoon depicting vagrants; poor individuals begging for money, wearing tattered, patched-up clothing

=== Poverty cosplay and reasons for resurgence ===
The growing culture of mending on social media spurts discussions about how a task that has been the daily occurrence within less privileged groups is becoming a trend widely popularized by more affluent communities, in the vein of so-called poverty cosplay. The critique often cites the stereotypical imagery of a poverty-stricken individual, clothed in patched garments, being repurposed for a fashion trend. While mending clothes was and is a necessity for some groups, especially those of lower socioeconomic status, the visible mending communicates being privileged enough to take time to mend by adorning a garment, and thus is an extravagance when compared to utility-focused mending. Kate Fletcher used a descriptor of "delight in the durational aesthetics of repair" to delineate this phenomenon. In contemporary times, the act of purchasing newly-made clothes with intentional rips, stains, and frayed seams has become a common practice among younger generations of fashion consumers since the mid-1990s. This shift in perspective reflects a changing perception of what is fashionable, thus the original statement against the status quo has been commercialized—but, as some argue, so has been the practice of mending the items, given the facet that special “mending kits” are being sold worldwide, often consisting of regular household items, such as scissors, thread, and prepackaged fabric scraps.

Conversely, some sociologists argue that visible mending is a method of highlighting the fact that "rather than celebrating the creativity and the craft of maintaining, we have always focused on the shame and poverty and need" and restoring the respect that poverty-stricken individuals were stripped of due to social stigma. Given that textile work has been perceived as a female pursuit throughout the history, bringing attention to the act of mending can also be perceive as a feminist statement.

Some attribute the resurfacing of visible mending and coining the wholesale term to the COVID-19 pandemic and lockdowns. Those made people seek entertainment within their own living spaces and try activities that were associated with non-consumerist, bohemian culture, such as bread baking.

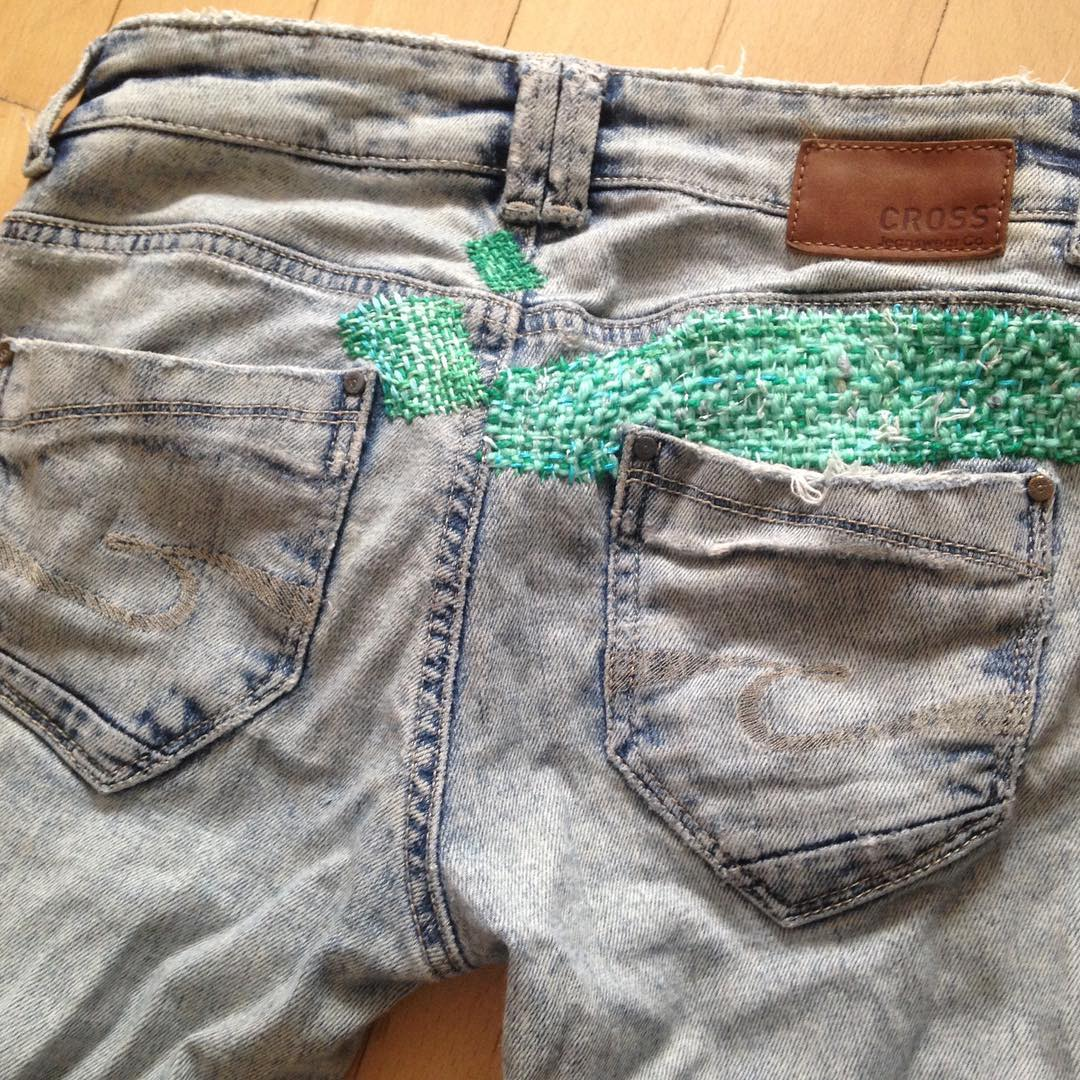
Pair of jeans visibly mended by weaving and darning using mint green embroidery thread.

=== Practice as a critique and act of defiance ===
The skill of mending clothes has diminished in recent decades, largely due to the prevalence of fast fashion and its emphasis on easy and affordable clothing replacements rather than repairing old garments. As a result, many individuals lack the basic sewing skills required for simple repairs such as button replacement or sock darning and the decision to mend an item is a deliberate, optional action taken by an individual, rather than a fact of life. The convenience and affordability of purchasing new clothes have overshadowed the formerly appreciated value and importance of preserving and maintaining existing items through mending. Some practitioners describe the stigma of mending items:

There are plenty of reasons why people mend, though the stigma around repair is alive and well. Recently I mended a favourite shirt for my partner, a teacher, who was later asked by a student, “Sir, can't you afford a new shirt?” What was once a luxury item, a new piece of clothing, has become throwaway for some, and expensive and rare yarns such as cashmere are now ubiquitous.

This shift in mindset away from disposability carries a strong anti-capitalist sentiment and is seen as a form of performative resistance or normalisation of reducing the consumption of textiles by outwardly communicating that one mends them. This is sometime called craftivism. Some clothing brands, however, adopted visible mending as a form of novelty marketing (for example as pop-up upcycling events), communicating dedication to sustainability, whilst promoting their own merchandise, thus garnering critique from anti-fast fashion activists.

== Visible mending of non-textile items ==
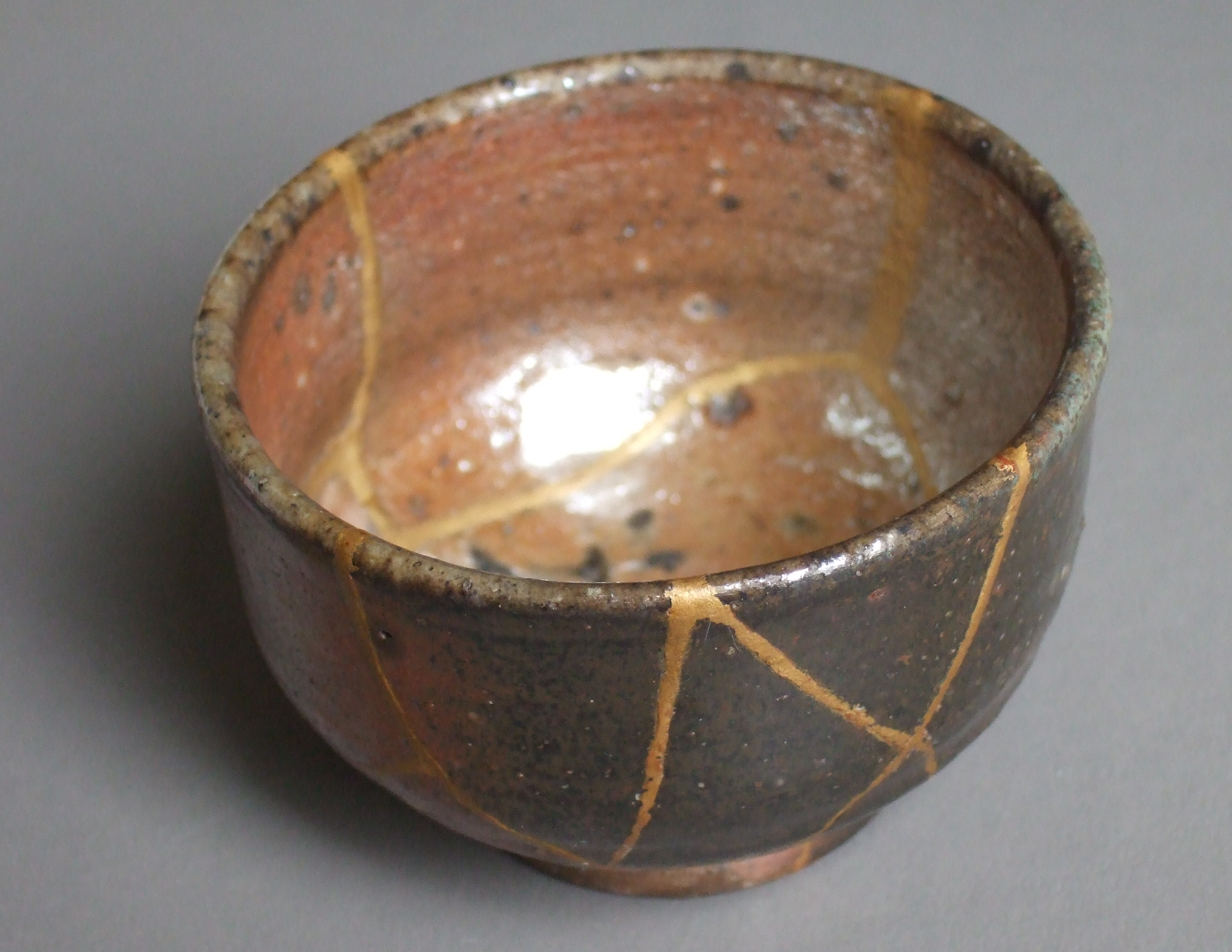
Cup visibly mended using kintsukuroi

Kintsukuroi is a similar practice originating in Japan; it involves the restoration of broken pottery by meticulously repairing the fractured areas using lacquer blended with powdered gold, silver, or platinum. This technique not only mends the broken pieces, but also accentuates the mended areas with precious metals, creating a unique and visually interesting effect. The practice of using Lego bricks to patch crumbling walls or other structures is also a form of visible mending.

== See also ==
- Invisible mending
- Textile arts
- Craftivism
