= Invisible mending =

Weaving method for repairing fabric

Invisible mending is a fabric repair technique that re-weaves yarn into the fabric of a garment or item of upholstery to seamlessly patch a hole. The technique reconstructs both the warp and weft of the fabric by collecting warp and weft yarns from the hem or a piece of fabric of the same kind, before using a long needle to reweave the yarns to match the original weave exactly. The finished repair is undetectable on the right side of the fabric, though on the reverse of the fabric, long, hanging yarns will be visible around the area that has been rewoven. The technique is done without tacking the new yarns into place, as this may deform the fabric.

In contrast to visible mending, invisible mending is intended to conceal damage to fabric. Invisible mending is harder to learn and teach than visible mending, however. Based on its utility as a metaphor for psychotherapy, invisible mending is the topic of select poems.

== History ==
The industrialization of the 1800s and 1900s led to an exacting 'science' of mending that favored invisible mending over visible, as the latter became increasingly seen as amateur and feminine—i.e., in contrast to "men of science." Advertisements for invisible mending can be found in American, Australian, and Canadian newspapers from 1912 to 1960. Invisible mending has been practiced for over 55 years by Japanese craftsman Takao Matsumoto through the art of kaketsugi—"invisible mending" in Japanese.

Up until the 1970s, invisible mending was common practice, despite being labour-intensive and time consuming; however, with the advent of cheaper ready-to-wear clothing, post-1960, it became increasingly more economic to replace the garment entirely rather than repair it. Most menders were women, until the craft started to disappear; though uncommon in the present day, invisible mending has now become a fine craft associated with tapestry weaving. Invisible mending is still provided by some quality dry cleaners.
