= Lohrberg (Frankfurt am Main) =

Hill in Germany

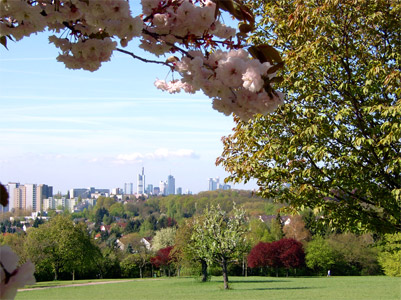
- View of Seckbach with Atzelberg, Im Staffel and Huthpark, and the Frankfurt skyline in the background

Highest point
- Elevation: 185 m (607 ft)

Geography
- Location: Frankfurt am Main, Hesse, Germany
- Parent range: Berger Rücken
- Topo map: LAGIS Hessen

The Lohrberg (often simply called Lohr) is a hill about 185 m (607 ft) high in the city of Frankfurt, Hesse, Germany. It is considered Frankfurt's Hausberg (local mountain) and is home to the only remaining vineyard within the city limits. The Lohrberg belongs to the Seckbach quarter and is part of the Berger Rücken ridge, which stretches in a shallow U-shape from Berkersheim to beyond Bergen towards Maintal. Near the Berger Warte lies Frankfurt's highest point at 212.4m above sea level.

== History ==
The name derives from the medieval field name Lohr. Its etymology is uncertain: it may mean "pastureland" or be related to Old High German lar ("bare" or "empty"). Both interpretations suggest that the hill was originally treeless and used for agriculture.

A section of the medieval Hohe Straße, part of the Via Regia, runs across the Lohrberg. This important trade and pilgrimage route connected the Rhine with Silesia and ultimately Spain with Russia.

Seckbach’s name derives from Seckibah ("sicker water"), referring to springs on the Lohrberg that feed into the Seckbacher Ried. Viticulture on the hill has been documented since 882, and may have Roman origins: nearby excavations revealed a villa, sanctuary, roads, and remains of a Jupiter Column, now in the Historical Museum Frankfurt.

After secularisation in 1803, ownership of the vineyards passed from the Carmelite monastery to the City of Frankfurt. Since 1903 the vineyards have been cultivated as the Lohrberger Hang by the municipal winery.

After Seckbach’s incorporation into Frankfurt in 1900, garden director Carl Heicke initiated plans for public parks. Between 1910–1913 the Huthpark was created; from 1919 work began on the Lohrpark and the first allotment gardens.

The Lohrhaus, a two-storey half-timbered house from 1763, became part of the restaurant Lohrberg-Schänke, opened in 1933. In the 1920s and 1930s further facilities such as a children’s recreation garden and war memorial were built.

During World War II, the Lohrberg was bombed, and lawns were used for vegetable cultivation. After 1945, new sports and leisure facilities followed, including the Friedrich-Ludwig-Jahn memorial (1953) and the annual Lohrbergfest.

In the 1990s soil movement was confirmed (about 1 cm per year), consistent with earlier landslides. Since 2005 the Main-Äppel-Haus Lohrberg has served as an environmental education centre.

=== Archaeology ===
In the late 19th century, excavations by the Senckenberg Society uncovered fossil remains at the foot of the Lohrberg, originally classified as Hippopotamus seckbachensis, later reidentified as Anthracotherium seckbachense.

== Characterisation ==
The Lohrberg and Lohrpark are part of the Frankfurt Green Belt, serving as an important cold- and fresh-air zone. The park contains lawns, playgrounds, the Lohrberg-Schänke, memorials, and extensive walking paths with panoramic views of Frankfurt, the Spessart, and Odenwald ranges.

== Springs ==
Several springs rise on the Lohrberg due to rainwater seeping into marl and clay strata. These feed the Mühlbach, which once powered the Seckbach mill and today contributes to the Seckbacher Ried nature reserve. Many springs are stations on the Quellenwanderweg trail.

== Vineyard ==
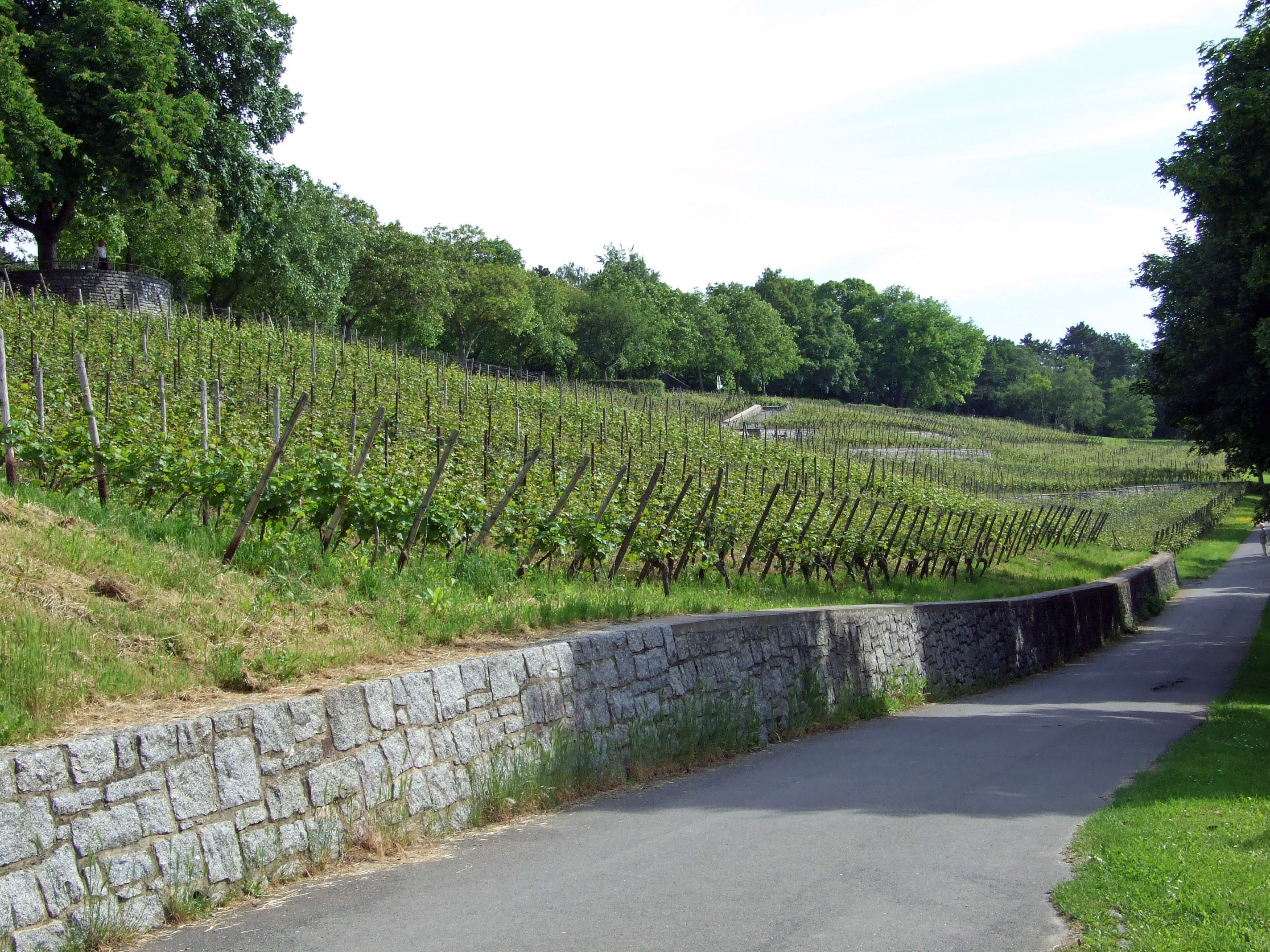
Vineyard Lohrberger Hang (Riesling, Rheingau)

The Lohrberger Hang is the easternmost site of the Rheingau wine region. Covering 1.3 hectares (3.2 acres), it produces about 10,000 bottles of Riesling annually, managed by the municipal winery. The wines often reach Spätlese and Auslese quality levels and are regularly awarded at the Hessian state wine awards.

== Memorials ==
Two monuments stand in the park:

- the war memorial (1930; expanded in 1993 to include WWII victims)
- the Jahn memorial (1953), commemorating the gymnastics pioneer who spoke nearby in 1848.

== Gardens ==
The first permanent allotment colony in Frankfurt was established on the Lohrberg in 1919; today more than 3 ha are used for gardening.

== Trails ==
The Lohrberg is part of the 118 km Vulkan-Steig (Vater-Bender-Weg), as well as the Quellenwanderweg.

== Gastronomy ==
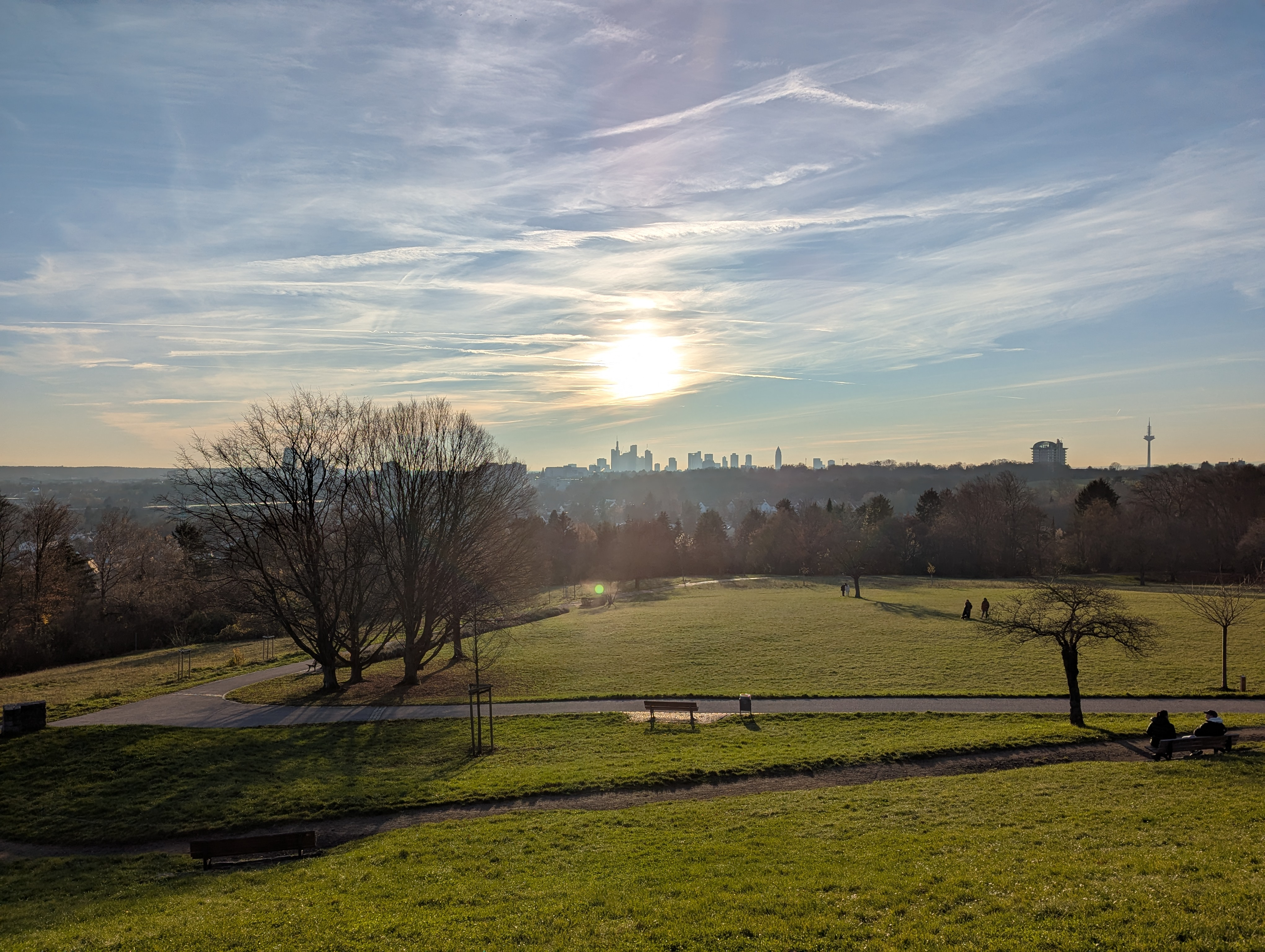
View from Lohrberg on the Frankfurt Skyline

The Lohrberg-Schänke, opened in 1933, is a popular excursion restaurant incorporating the Lohrhaus. The Main-Äppel-Haus Lohrberg offers an Äppel-Bistro with local food and drinks.

== Lohrbergfest ==
Since 1951 the Lohrberg has hosted the annual Lohrbergfest, a youth athletics festival organised by the Turnverein Seckbach 1875. Events include sprints, long jump, shot put, and relays, attracting hundreds of participants from Frankfurt and Bad Vilbel.

== Planning ==
The city plans to link Lohrpark with Huthpark via a new "Wiesenpark", forming a continuous green corridor in Seckbach.

== Transport ==
The Lohrberg can be reached by car via the Friedberger Landstraße or Wilhelmshöher Straße. Bus lines 30, 43 and the weekend line 83 (Lohrbergbus) provide public transport connections.
