= Seckbach (Frankfurt am Main) =

- Quarter of Frankfurt am Main
- Coat of arms

- Location of Seckbach (red) and the Ortsbezirk Ost (light red) within Frankfurt am Main
- Interactive map of Seckbach
- Location within Germany Location within Hesse
- Coordinates: 50°08′41″N 08°43′37″E
- Country: Germany
- State: Hesse
- Admin. region: Darmstadt
- District: Urban district
- City: Frankfurt am Main

Area
  - Total: 8.041 km^{2} (3.105 sq mi)

Population (2020-12-31)
  - Total: 10,473
  - Density: 1,302/km^{2} (3,373/sq mi)
- Time zone: UTC+01:00 (CET)
  - Summer (DST): UTC+02:00 (CEST)
- Postal codes: 60386, 60388, 60389
- Dialling codes: 069
- Vehicle registration: F
- Website: https://frankfurt.de/frankfurt-entdecken-und-erleben/stadtportrait/stadtteile/seckbach

Seckbach has been a quarter of Frankfurt am Main since 1 July 1900.

== Geography ==
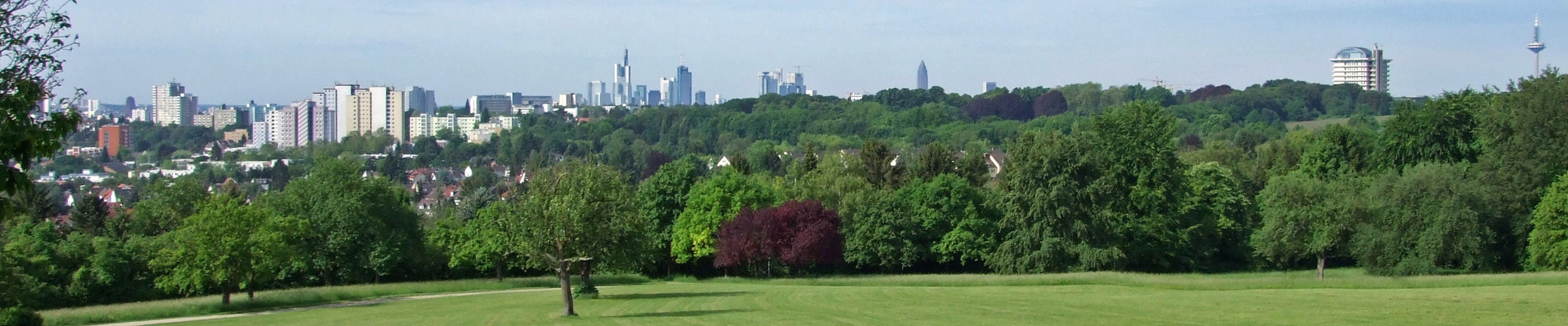
Panoramic view from Lohrberg over Frankfurt

=== Location ===
The center of Seckbach lies about 5 km northeast of Frankfurt's Innenstadt, on both sides of a former arm of the Main, along an old road at the slope of the Lohrberg. The Lohrberg is part of the geological formation known as the Berger Rücken. It marks the easternmost edge of the Rheingau wine region and contains its smallest vineyard, the Lohrberger Hang.

At the eastern edge, near the Berger Warte and the Leopoldsäule, lies the highest point in Frankfurt at 212 m (696 ft) above sea level.

=== Boundaries ===
In the west the boundary runs along the A 661, in the south along the Riedgraben stream north of Am Erlenbruch street, including large parts of the Borsigallee. The industrial zone borders on those of Bergen-Enkheim, Riederwald and Fechenheim. The easternmost point lies east of the Vilbeler Landstraße, above Florianweg (Bergen).

The northern boundary includes the old Zollhaus (1775), the site of the former Heiligenstock transmitter (1926–1945), the southern part of the Parkfriedhof Heiligenstock, and reaches nearly to the Berger Warte and Leopoldsäule.

=== Settlement ===
Seckbach has preserved parts of its original village structure, especially in the historic core and remaining farmland. The old village features one of the best-preserved ensembles of half-timbered houses in Frankfurt. From there, settlement expanded southwest towards the city.

Today the quarter consists of residential areas with parks and a large industrial zone in the southeast, in the lowlands.

=== Economy ===
Viticulture once dominated but has mostly given way to orchards. Seckbach contains the largest continuous area of orchard meadows in Hesse, which are of ecological significance.

== History ==
=== Prehistory and Roman era ===
The district contains prehistoric sites. From Roman times, remains of a Jupiter giant column were found, now kept in the Historical Museum Frankfurt.

=== Middle Ages ===
The earliest record of Seckbach as Seckibah dates to 882. Around the same time it appears in the Lorscher Codex as Seckebac. On 14 February 947, King Otto I granted his steward Wetti a royal Hufe in Seckbach. In 1178, the village of Kirchberg between Seckbach and Bergen is mentioned; its church was initially also the parish church of Seckbach.

Seckbach belonged to the Amt Bornheimerberg. In 1320 King Louis IV pledged the Bornheimerberg, including Seckbach, to Ulrich II of Hanau. Despite Frankfurt's attempts to resist, Seckbach became part of Hanau-Münzenberg in 1481.

=== Name forms ===
- Seckebac (830–850)
- Seckibah (882)
- Seggibah (947)
- Siccenbach (977)
- Sekebach (11th/12th century)
- Seckebach (1247)

=== Early modern period ===
In the German Peasants' War, villagers demanded rights from Count Philip II. During the Reformation, most residents remained Lutheran despite Hanau's adoption of Calvinism. In 1710, the Lutheran Marienkirche was consecrated.

=== Under Hesse-Kassel ===
After the extinction of Hanau-Münzenberg in 1642, Seckbach passed to Hesse-Kassel. In 1759 the Battle of Bergen was partly fought on Seckbach land. In 1790 Landgrave Wilhelm IX hosted Emperor Leopold II near Seckbach, commemorated by the Leopoldsäule.

=== 19th century ===
In 1821 Seckbach joined the united Protestant church (Hanauer Union). In 1866 Hesse-Kassel was annexed by Prussia. Seckbach became part of the Province of Hesse-Nassau, later of the district of Frankfurt. On 1 July 1900 it was incorporated into Frankfurt.

=== 20th century ===
During World War II air raids killed 33 residents and destroyed the Marienkirche. Postwar rebuilding included new housing, schools, the Maria Rosenkranz Catholic church, and the Berufsgenossenschaftliche Unfallklinik. In 1981 economics minister Heinz-Herbert Karry was assassinated at his home in Seckbach.

== Population development ==
- 1632: 87 households
- 1753: 141 families (630 persons)
- 1812: 1139 inhabitants
- 1885: 2466 inhabitants
- 1950: 5268 inhabitants
- 2019: 10,605 inhabitants

== Religion ==
- Evangelical Marienkirche
- Catholic Maria Rosenkranz Church
- Synagogue in the Henry and Emma Budge Home
- Two mosques

== Parks and nature ==
- Lohrberg – famous viewpoint and vineyard
- Huthpark – first public park after incorporation
- Quellenwanderweg – hiking trail
- Seckbacher Ried – nature reserve since 1937
- Sausee – natural monument, former oxbow lake

== Transport ==
Seckbach is served by U-Bahn lines U4 and U7, and several bus lines. A tram connected Seckbach to Frankfurt from 1905 until 1970.

== Economy ==
The industrial zone hosts companies such as Equinix and Hormosan Pharma. Historically, firms like Carl Zeiss and J. S. Fries Sohn were located here. The Lohrberger Hang vineyard produces Riesling, marketed as Frankfurter Lohrberger Hang.

== Notable people ==
- Max Quarck (1860–1930), politician
- Meta Quarck-Hammerschlag (1864–1954), social reformer
- Heinz-Herbert Karry (1920–1981), politician
- Heidemarie Wieczorek-Zeul (* 1942), politician
- Reinhard Kaiser (1950–2025), writer
