= List of Jupiter trojans (Trojan camp) (100001–200000) =

This is a partial list of Jupiter's L_{5} trojans (60° behind Jupiter) with numbers 100001–200000. If available, an object's mean diameter is taken from the NEOWISE data release, which the Small-Body Database has also adopted. Mean diameters are rounded to two significant figures if smaller than 100 kilometers. Estimates are in italics and calculated from a magnitude-to-diameter conversion, using an assumed albedo of 0.057.

== 100001–200000 ==
This list contains 298 objects sorted in numerical order.

Designation	Discovery			Orbital description					Diam.	Remarks	Refs
Designation	Date	Observer	Site	a (AU)	e	i (°)	q (AU)	Q (AU)	Diam.	Remarks	Refs
(105654) 2000 SX_{26}	23 September 2000	LINEAR	Socorro	5.244	0.138	4.8	4.520	5.968	14 km	–	catalog · MPC · JPL
(105685) 2000 SC_{51}	23 September 2000	LINEAR	Socorro	5.286	0.056	15.5	4.992	5.581	19 km	–	catalog · MPC · JPL
(105694) 2000 SV_{62}	24 September 2000	LINEAR	Socorro	5.226	0.108	24.1	4.661	5.791	23 km	–	catalog · MPC · JPL
(105720) 2000 SR_{79}	24 September 2000	LINEAR	Socorro	5.290	0.056	9.8	4.994	5.585	17 km	–	catalog · MPC · JPL
(105746) 2000 SP_{92}	23 September 2000	LINEAR	Socorro	5.242	0.075	19.9	4.850	5.634	14 km	–	catalog · MPC · JPL
(105803) 2000 SH_{132}	22 September 2000	LINEAR	Socorro	5.271	0.077	28.0	4.866	5.677	16 km	–	catalog · MPC · JPL
(105808) 2000 SZ_{135}	23 September 2000	LINEAR	Socorro	5.238	0.017	34.5	5.151	5.325	24 km	–	catalog · MPC · JPL
(105896) 2000 SG_{187}	21 September 2000	NEAT	Haleakala	5.257	0.128	10.7	4.582	5.931	14 km	–	catalog · MPC · JPL
(105901) 2000 SG_{192}	24 September 2000	LINEAR	Socorro	5.260	0.027	15.5	5.120	5.400	16 km	–	catalog · MPC · JPL
(105904) 2000 SB_{197}	24 September 2000	LINEAR	Socorro	5.220	0.025	8.3	5.091	5.350	13 km	–	catalog · MPC · JPL
(106001) 2000 SR_{283}	23 September 2000	LINEAR	Socorro	5.257	0.019	9.3	5.158	5.356	17 km	–	catalog · MPC · JPL
(106060) 2000 SS_{316}	30 September 2000	LINEAR	Socorro	5.192	0.031	17.4	5.031	5.353	17 km	–	catalog · MPC · JPL
(106091) 2000 SZ_{361}	23 September 2000	LONEOS	Anderson Mesa	5.179	0.053	8.5	4.906	5.452	15 km	–	catalog · MPC · JPL
(106143) 2000 TU_{44}	1 October 2000	LINEAR	Socorro	5.153	0.067	14.1	4.810	5.497	19 km	–	catalog · MPC · JPL
(106160) 2000 TG_{61}	2 October 2000	LONEOS	Anderson Mesa	5.314	0.047	15.1	5.065	5.562	13 km	–	catalog · MPC · JPL
(109266) 2001 QL_{110}	19 August 2001	P. Kušnirák	Ondrejov	5.197	0.162	23.3	4.354	6.040	11 km	–	catalog · MPC · JPL
(109549) 2001 QM_{257}	25 August 2001	LINEAR	Socorro	5.184	0.079	22.3	4.774	5.594	20 km	–	catalog · MPC · JPL
(110359) 2001 SA_{318}	19 September 2001	LINEAR	Socorro	5.256	0.087	3.4	4.800	5.711	14 km	–	catalog · MPC · JPL
(110380) 2001 SO_{343}	22 September 2001	NEAT	Palomar	5.206	0.087	22.7	4.753	5.660	16 km	–	catalog · MPC · JPL
(110563) 2001 TQ_{109}	14 October 2001	LINEAR	Socorro	5.143	0.078	3.0	4.742	5.544	14 km	–	catalog · MPC · JPL
(110829) 2001 UT_{54}	20 October 2001	LINEAR	Socorro	5.247	0.021	4.8	5.139	5.355	11 km	–	catalog · MPC · JPL
(110832) 2001 UA_{58}	17 October 2001	LINEAR	Socorro	5.198	0.028	1.4	5.054	5.342	14 km	–	catalog · MPC · JPL
(110859) 2001 UW_{79}	20 October 2001	LINEAR	Socorro	5.181	0.074	3.2	4.798	5.563	13 km	–	catalog · MPC · JPL
(111113) 2001 VK_{85}	12 November 2001	LINEAR	Socorro	5.263	0.050	7.7	5.000	5.526	15 km	–	catalog · MPC · JPL
(111198) 2001 WX_{20}	18 November 2001	LINEAR	Socorro	5.181	0.070	1.1	4.821	5.541	12 km	–	catalog · MPC · JPL
(111231) 2001 WM_{60}	19 November 2001	LINEAR	Socorro	5.277	0.061	1.6	4.955	5.600	13 km	–	catalog · MPC · JPL
(114141) 2002 VX_{60}	4 November 2002	NEAT	Haleakala	5.144	0.073	19.7	4.771	5.518	21 km	–	catalog · MPC · JPL
(114208) 2002 VH_{107}	12 November 2002	LINEAR	Socorro	5.154	0.053	26.7	4.882	5.426	20 km	–	catalog · MPC · JPL
(114345) 2002 XN_{72}	11 December 2002	LINEAR	Socorro	5.308	0.066	16.7	4.959	5.656	22 km	–	catalog · MPC · JPL
(116134) 2003 WZ_{142}	23 November 2003	LINEAR	Socorro	5.154	0.057	7.7	4.859	5.449	15 km	–	catalog · MPC · JPL
(116238) 2003 YJ_{12}	17 December 2003	LINEAR	Socorro	5.232	0.057	9.1	4.931	5.532	17 km	–	catalog · MPC · JPL
(116439) 2003 YN_{162}	17 December 2003	LINEAR	Socorro	5.169	0.099	14.6	4.658	5.681	13 km	–	catalog · MPC · JPL
(116567) 2004 BV_{84}	27 January 2004	LINEAR	Socorro	5.322	0.046	5.2	5.074	5.569	11 km	–	catalog · MPC · JPL
(117385) 2004 YN_{20}	18 December 2004	MLS	Mount Lemmon	5.284	0.044	13.3	5.053	5.515	22 km	–	catalog · MPC · JPL
(117389) 2004 YD_{23}	18 December 2004	MLS	Mount Lemmon	5.170	0.075	25.2	4.781	5.558	19 km	–	catalog · MPC · JPL
(117395) 2004 YL_{35}	21 December 2004	CSS	Catalina	5.139	0.036	12.4	4.953	5.325	17 km	–	catalog · MPC · JPL
(117404) 2005 AC_{9}	7 January 2005	LINEAR	Socorro	5.121	0.029	22.8	4.972	5.270	23 km	–	catalog · MPC · JPL
(117423) 2005 AP_{18}	7 January 2005	LINEAR	Socorro	5.253	0.098	9.1	4.741	5.766	17 km	–	catalog · MPC · JPL
(117446) 2005 AV_{45}	11 January 2005	LINEAR	Socorro	5.200	0.083	6.1	4.767	5.632	15 km	–	catalog · MPC · JPL
(117447) 2005 AX_{46}	11 January 2005	LINEAR	Socorro	5.252	0.057	29.5	4.951	5.552	31 km	–	catalog · MPC · JPL
(118815) 2000 SM_{108}	24 September 2000	LINEAR	Socorro	5.255	0.177	2.0	4.323	6.188	18 km	–	catalog · MPC · JPL
(119528) 2001 US_{179}	26 October 2001	NEAT	Haleakala	5.179	0.104	15.7	4.641	5.716	22 km	–	catalog · MPC · JPL
(120453) 1988 RE_{12}	14 September 1988	S. J. Bus	Cerro Tololo	5.187	0.140	15.3	4.462	5.911	12 km	–	catalog · MPC · JPL
(120454) 1988 SJ_{2}	16 September 1988	S. J. Bus	Cerro Tololo	5.211	0.055	15.3	4.925	5.497	17 km	–	catalog · MPC · JPL
(122391) 2000 QZ_{75}	24 August 2000	LINEAR	Socorro	5.199	0.112	14.6	4.617	5.781	17 km	–	catalog · MPC · JPL
(122460) 2000 QB_{146}	31 August 2000	LINEAR	Socorro	5.218	0.079	17.9	4.803	5.632	21 km	–	catalog · MPC · JPL
(122581) 2000 RJ_{24}	1 September 2000	LINEAR	Socorro	5.169	0.073	10.6	4.790	5.547	17 km	–	catalog · MPC · JPL
(122592) 2000 RE_{29}	1 September 2000	LINEAR	Socorro	5.165	0.052	28.5	4.897	5.434	21 km	–	catalog · MPC · JPL
(122733) 2000 SK_{47}	23 September 2000	LINEAR	Socorro	5.112	0.041	22.0	4.900	5.324	15 km	–	catalog · MPC · JPL
(122860) 2000 ST_{132}	23 September 2000	LINEAR	Socorro	5.188	0.057	13.9	4.891	5.484	18 km	–	catalog · MPC · JPL
(122862) 2000 SJ_{134}	23 September 2000	LINEAR	Socorro	5.270	0.097	12.1	4.760	5.781	13 km	–	catalog · MPC · JPL
(122962) 2000 SG_{215}	26 September 2000	LINEAR	Socorro	5.145	0.072	2.6	4.772	5.517	17 km	–	catalog · MPC · JPL
(124695) 2001 SR_{136}	16 September 2001	LINEAR	Socorro	5.189	0.000	12.0	5.187	5.191	17 km	–	catalog · MPC · JPL
(124696) 2001 SC_{137}	16 September 2001	LINEAR	Socorro	5.149	0.065	3.1	4.814	5.483	15 km	–	catalog · MPC · JPL
(124729) 2001 SB_{173}	16 September 2001	LINEAR	Socorro	5.181	0.100	8.1	4.665	5.698	16 km	–	catalog · MPC · JPL
(124985) 2001 TK_{131}	10 October 2001	NEAT	Palomar	5.206	0.051	12.2	4.939	5.473	19 km	–	catalog · MPC · JPL
(125045) 2001 TK_{211}	13 October 2001	NEAT	Palomar	5.199	0.013	23.6	5.132	5.265	23 km	–	catalog · MPC · JPL
(125048) 2001 TW_{215}	13 October 2001	NEAT	Palomar	5.273	0.074	17.0	4.880	5.666	18 km	–	catalog · MPC · JPL
(125059) 2001 TB_{233}	15 October 2001	NEAT	Palomar	5.198	0.056	10.0	4.908	5.487	16 km	–	catalog · MPC · JPL
(125062) 2001 TG_{234}	15 October 2001	NEAT	Haleakala	5.163	0.085	15.7	4.722	5.603	17 km	–	catalog · MPC · JPL
(125106) 2001 UR_{39}	17 October 2001	LINEAR	Socorro	5.241	0.107	4.3	4.682	5.800	14 km	–	catalog · MPC · JPL
(125159) 2001 UV_{93}	19 October 2001	NEAT	Haleakala	5.238	0.068	15.3	4.883	5.594	22 km	–	catalog · MPC · JPL
(127532) 2002 WH_{9}	24 November 2002	NEAT	Palomar	5.149	0.010	10.9	5.095	5.203	16 km	–	catalog · MPC · JPL
(127534) 2002 WR_{17}	30 November 2002	LINEAR	Socorro	5.227	0.044	14.8	4.999	5.454	18 km	–	catalog · MPC · JPL
(128299) 2003 YL_{61}	19 December 2003	LINEAR	Socorro	5.284	0.069	21.8	4.919	5.650	27 km	–	catalog · MPC · JPL
(128301) 2003 YZ_{139}	28 December 2003	LINEAR	Socorro	5.136	0.054	26.1	4.857	5.414	18 km	–	catalog · MPC · JPL
(129130) 2004 YP_{20}	18 December 2004	MLS	Mount Lemmon	5.141	0.072	1.5	4.771	5.512	14 km	–	catalog · MPC · JPL
(129133) 2004 YZ_{31}	20 December 2004	MLS	Mount Lemmon	5.180	0.044	23.2	4.954	5.407	22 km	–	catalog · MPC · JPL
(129134) 2005 AC_{5}	6 January 2005	CSS	Catalina	5.212	0.067	14.8	4.863	5.560	19 km	–	catalog · MPC · JPL
(129135) 2005 AD_{21}	6 January 2005	CSS	Catalina	5.290	0.040	33.1	5.081	5.500	20 km	–	catalog · MPC · JPL
129137 Hippolochos	13 January 2005	M. Ory	Vicques	5.130	0.058	12.5	4.830	5.429	14 km	–	catalog · MPC · JPL
(129140) 2005 AO_{50}	13 January 2005	LINEAR	Socorro	5.184	0.017	9.4	5.094	5.274	16 km	–	catalog · MPC · JPL
(129142) 2005 AS_{60}	15 January 2005	Spacewatch	Kitt Peak	5.230	0.047	1.3	4.986	5.473	13 km	–	catalog · MPC · JPL
(129144) 2005 BP_{25}	18 January 2005	CSS	Catalina	5.162	0.079	27.7	4.751	5.572	19 km	–	catalog · MPC · JPL
(129145) 2005 CE	1 February 2005	R. A. Tucker	Goodricke-Pigott	5.273	0.050	18.4	5.009	5.537	16 km	–	catalog · MPC · JPL
(129147) 2005 CY_{70}	1 February 2005	CSS	Catalina	5.201	0.058	16.5	4.899	5.503	19 km	–	catalog · MPC · JPL
(129153) 2005 EL_{140}	10 March 2005	CSS	Catalina	5.201	0.007	26.7	5.164	5.239	17 km	–	catalog · MPC · JPL
(130588) 2000 RD_{83}	1 September 2000	LINEAR	Socorro	5.220	0.053	31.9	4.946	5.495	19 km	–	catalog · MPC · JPL
(130592) 2000 RT_{87}	2 September 2000	LONEOS	Anderson Mesa	5.275	0.016	19.3	5.192	5.358	19 km	–	catalog · MPC · JPL
(130648) 2000 SW_{76}	24 September 2000	LINEAR	Socorro	5.153	0.061	3.9	4.837	5.469	14 km	–	catalog · MPC · JPL
(130687) 2000 SZ_{131}	22 September 2000	LINEAR	Socorro	5.214	0.094	19.1	4.725	5.703	18 km	–	catalog · MPC · JPL
(131447) 2001 QZ_{113}	22 August 2001	LINEAR	Socorro	5.227	0.040	33.8	5.017	5.438	24 km	–	catalog · MPC · JPL
(131451) 2001 QD_{174}	26 August 2001	LINEAR	Socorro	5.097	0.078	27.3	4.701	5.492	21 km	–	catalog · MPC · JPL
(131460) 2001 QE_{194}	22 August 2001	LINEAR	Socorro	5.110	0.062	27.8	4.793	5.428	16 km	–	catalog · MPC · JPL
(131539) 2001 US_{133}	21 October 2001	LINEAR	Socorro	5.197	0.092	1.6	4.720	5.674	13 km	–	catalog · MPC · JPL
(131546) 2001 VJ_{3}	9 November 2001	Spacewatch	Kitt Peak	5.241	0.037	4.3	5.049	5.434	11 km	–	catalog · MPC · JPL
(131581) 2001 VG_{121}	15 November 2001	Spacewatch	Kitt Peak	5.220	0.050	2.8	4.958	5.483	13 km	–	catalog · MPC · JPL
(131635) 2001 XW_{71}	11 December 2001	LINEAR	Socorro	5.318	0.066	3.7	4.969	5.667	15 km	–	catalog · MPC · JPL
(133566) 2003 UZ_{27}	26 October 2003	Spacewatch	Kitt Peak	5.289	0.027	26.6	5.149	5.429	19 km	–	catalog · MPC · JPL
(133853) 2003 YQ_{133}	28 December 2003	LINEAR	Socorro	5.225	0.079	15.8	4.812	5.638	16 km	–	catalog · MPC · JPL
(133862) 2004 BR_{38}	20 January 2004	LINEAR	Socorro	5.209	0.008	31.1	5.167	5.251	17 km	–	catalog · MPC · JPL
(134077) 2004 XW_{71}	12 December 2004	Spacewatch	Kitt Peak	5.187	0.099	18.1	4.675	5.698	14 km	–	catalog · MPC · JPL
(134251) 2006 AN_{34}	6 January 2006	MLS	Mount Lemmon	5.128	0.090	26.4	4.668	5.588	18 km	–	catalog · MPC · JPL
(134269) 2006 BP_{114}	26 January 2006	Spacewatch	Kitt Peak	5.197	0.046	2.6	4.957	5.437	16 km	–	catalog · MPC · JPL
134329 Cycnos	16 October 1977	C. J. van Houten; I. van Houten-Groeneveld; T. Gehrels	Palomar	5.174	0.082	17.4	4.751	5.597	18 km	–	catalog · MPC · JPL
134419 Hippothous	28 June 1998	E. W. Elst	La Silla	5.239	0.179	8.4	4.304	6.175	17 km	–	catalog · MPC · JPL
(150872) 2001 ST_{201}	19 September 2001	LINEAR	Socorro	5.189	0.096	5.1	4.692	5.686	12 km	–	catalog · MPC · JPL
(150876) 2001 SA_{220}	19 September 2001	LINEAR	Socorro	5.151	0.077	4.1	4.755	5.547	11 km	–	catalog · MPC · JPL
(151883) 2003 WQ_{25}	21 November 2003	LINEAR	Socorro	5.136	0.044	5.5	4.910	5.362	14 km	–	catalog · MPC · JPL
(151884) 2003 WO_{40}	19 November 2003	Spacewatch	Kitt Peak	5.176	0.036	15.3	4.990	5.363	16 km	–	catalog · MPC · JPL
(152297) 2005 TH_{49}	6 October 2005	MLS	Mount Lemmon	5.133	0.066	13.0	4.793	5.473	14 km	–	catalog · MPC · JPL
(152517) 2006 AD_{72}	6 January 2006	Spacewatch	Kitt Peak	5.210	0.071	4.3	4.840	5.579	12 km	–	catalog · MPC · JPL
(152519) 2006 CT_{61}	3 February 2006	LONEOS	Anderson Mesa	5.155	0.058	21.1	4.856	5.454	16 km	–	catalog · MPC · JPL
(153083) 2000 RH_{28}	1 September 2000	LINEAR	Socorro	5.283	0.085	19.9	4.833	5.734	20 km	–	catalog · MPC · JPL
(153107) 2000 SY_{55}	24 September 2000	LINEAR	Socorro	5.271	0.047	11.3	5.022	5.519	13 km	–	catalog · MPC · JPL
(153122) 2000 SA_{97}	23 September 2000	LINEAR	Socorro	5.202	0.067	14.7	4.855	5.549	15 km	–	catalog · MPC · JPL
(153141) 2000 SP_{203}	24 September 2000	LINEAR	Socorro	5.285	0.072	17.2	4.907	5.663	17 km	–	catalog · MPC · JPL
(153155) 2000 SO_{298}	28 September 2000	LINEAR	Socorro	5.254	0.079	12.7	4.837	5.671	15 km	–	catalog · MPC · JPL
(153464) 2001 RW_{6}	10 September 2001	W. K. Y. Yeung	Desert Eagle	5.244	0.085	9.0	4.798	5.691	18 km	–	catalog · MPC · JPL
(153500) 2001 RN_{122}	12 September 2001	LINEAR	Socorro	5.106	0.023	15.7	4.987	5.226	14 km	–	catalog · MPC · JPL
(153708) 2001 UK_{76}	17 October 2001	LINEAR	Socorro	5.162	0.113	9.2	4.577	5.746	15 km	–	catalog · MPC · JPL
(153755) 2001 UZ_{199}	19 October 2001	NEAT	Palomar	5.170	0.147	2.3	4.408	5.932	11 km	–	catalog · MPC · JPL
(153757) 2001 UN_{210}	21 October 2001	L. Ball	Emerald Lane	5.219	0.105	5.4	4.673	5.765	11 km	–	catalog · MPC · JPL
(153758) 2001 UQ_{214}	23 October 2001	LINEAR	Socorro	5.264	0.033	4.1	5.090	5.438	15 km	–	catalog · MPC · JPL
(154417) 2003 BO_{25}	26 January 2003	NEAT	Palomar	5.229	0.079	31.2	4.815	5.643	21 km	–	catalog · MPC · JPL
(154632) 2003 WT_{151}	26 November 2003	Spacewatch	Kitt Peak	5.152	0.053	27.5	4.881	5.424	17 km	–	catalog · MPC · JPL
(154989) 2005 AG_{4}	6 January 2005	CSS	Catalina	5.185	0.123	8.6	4.546	5.824	15 km	–	catalog · MPC · JPL
(154990) 2005 AA_{66}	13 January 2005	Spacewatch	Kitt Peak	5.229	0.084	12.9	4.790	5.667	13 km	–	catalog · MPC · JPL
(154992) 2005 CV_{68}	4 February 2005	LONEOS	Anderson Mesa	5.279	0.080	9.6	4.860	5.699	18 km	–	catalog · MPC · JPL
(155326) 2006 AN_{97}	6 January 2006	LINEAR	Socorro	5.202	0.019	20.9	5.105	5.300	16 km	–	catalog · MPC · JPL
(155327) 2006 AV_{99}	6 January 2006	MLS	Mount Lemmon	5.243	0.055	7.9	4.957	5.530	12 km	–	catalog · MPC · JPL
(155332) 2006 BA_{157}	25 January 2006	Spacewatch	Kitt Peak	5.289	0.134	5.2	4.580	5.999	12 km	–	catalog · MPC · JPL
(155337) 2006 KH_{89}	29 May 2006	MLS	Mount Lemmon	5.229	0.091	17.0	4.754	5.705	17 km	–	catalog · MPC · JPL
(155415) 1996 JZ_{5}	11 May 1996	Spacewatch	Kitt Peak	5.245	0.141	3.9	4.507	5.982	11 km	–	catalog · MPC · JPL
(155427) 1997 LO_{5}	1 June 1997	Spacewatch	Kitt Peak	5.182	0.072	12.8	4.807	5.557	9.9 km	–	catalog · MPC · JPL
(155786) 2000 SD_{358}	28 September 2000	LONEOS	Anderson Mesa	5.277	0.109	23.5	4.703	5.851	16 km	–	catalog · MPC · JPL
(155789) 2000 TD_{9}	1 October 2000	LINEAR	Socorro	5.200	0.171	7.9	4.313	6.086	11 km	–	catalog · MPC · JPL
(156098) 2001 SR_{228}	19 September 2001	LINEAR	Socorro	5.146	0.098	7.7	4.642	5.650	11 km	–	catalog · MPC · JPL
(156123) 2001 SV_{337}	20 September 2001	LINEAR	Socorro	5.227	0.035	11.9	5.046	5.408	12 km	–	catalog · MPC · JPL
(156125) 2001 SH_{347}	25 September 2001	LINEAR	Socorro	5.239	0.043	18.0	5.013	5.465	18 km	–	catalog · MPC · JPL
(156185) 2001 TH_{220}	14 October 2001	LINEAR	Socorro	5.137	0.054	35.3	4.861	5.412	19 km	–	catalog · MPC · JPL
(156188) 2001 TV_{233}	15 October 2001	Spacewatch	Kitt Peak	5.232	0.093	4.6	4.745	5.719	15 km	–	catalog · MPC · JPL
(156210) 2001 UH_{57}	17 October 2001	LINEAR	Socorro	5.178	0.078	16.1	4.772	5.583	18 km	–	catalog · MPC · JPL
(156222) 2001 UB_{91}	23 October 2001	Spacewatch	Kitt Peak	5.089	0.073	5.8	4.716	5.462	10 km	–	catalog · MPC · JPL
(156237) 2001 UH_{146}	23 October 2001	LINEAR	Socorro	5.193	0.190	3.2	4.208	6.178	11 km	–	catalog · MPC · JPL
(156250) 2001 UM_{198}	19 October 2001	NEAT	Palomar	5.229	0.141	1.8	4.492	5.966	10 km	–	catalog · MPC · JPL
(156252) 2001 UV_{201}	19 October 2001	NEAT	Palomar	5.178	0.072	5.4	4.806	5.549	12 km	–	catalog · MPC · JPL
(156293) 2001 WB_{59}	19 November 2001	LINEAR	Socorro	5.259	0.100	3.6	4.733	5.785	13 km	–	catalog · MPC · JPL
(156294) 2001 WU_{66}	20 November 2001	LINEAR	Socorro	5.245	0.084	4.1	4.806	5.684	12 km	–	catalog · MPC · JPL
(156730) 2002 VM_{140}	13 November 2002	NEAT	Palomar	5.239	0.092	2.7	4.754	5.723	13 km	–	catalog · MPC · JPL
(157468) 2004 XS_{184}	10 December 2004	Spacewatch	Kitt Peak	5.207	0.028	9.5	5.062	5.352	13 km	–	catalog · MPC · JPL
(157469) 2005 AP_{31}	11 January 2005	LINEAR	Socorro	5.170	0.084	24.6	4.735	5.606	18 km	–	catalog · MPC · JPL
(157470) 2005 AG_{61}	15 January 2005	Spacewatch	Kitt Peak	5.220	0.013	4.7	5.151	5.288	12 km	–	catalog · MPC · JPL
(157471) 2005 AX_{71}	15 January 2005	Spacewatch	Kitt Peak	5.215	0.116	3.3	4.612	5.819	10 km	–	catalog · MPC · JPL
(157730) 2006 BS_{88}	25 January 2006	Spacewatch	Kitt Peak	5.273	0.026	4.3	5.133	5.413	8.4 km	–	catalog · MPC · JPL
(157740) 2006 BP_{199}	30 January 2006	Spacewatch	Kitt Peak	5.310	0.079	1.6	4.892	5.727	11 km	–	catalog · MPC · JPL
(157741) 2006 BE_{202}	31 January 2006	Spacewatch	Kitt Peak	5.220	0.094	9.5	4.730	5.710	15 km	–	catalog · MPC · JPL
(158231) 2001 SJ_{256}	19 September 2001	LINEAR	Socorro	5.202	0.022	7.9	5.089	5.315	12 km	–	catalog · MPC · JPL
(158333) 2001 WW_{25}	17 November 2001	LINEAR	Socorro	5.222	0.114	3.9	4.626	5.818	11 km	–	catalog · MPC · JPL
(158336) 2001 WM_{69}	20 November 2001	LINEAR	Socorro	5.235	0.046	3.8	4.995	5.475	11 km	–	catalog · MPC · JPL
(158601) 2002 VR_{121}	13 November 2002	LINEAR	Socorro	5.210	0.069	11.1	4.848	5.572	16 km	–	catalog · MPC · JPL
(159162) 2005 AY_{64}	13 January 2005	Spacewatch	Kitt Peak	5.228	0.072	4.7	4.852	5.605	13 km	–	catalog · MPC · JPL
(159163) 2005 ES_{129}	9 March 2005	MLS	Mount Lemmon	5.250	0.059	1.4	4.938	5.563	10 km	–	catalog · MPC · JPL
(159340) 2006 EF_{14}	2 March 2006	Spacewatch	Kitt Peak	5.298	0.038	10.7	5.096	5.501	13 km	–	catalog · MPC · JPL
(159342) 2006 JR	2 May 2006	Siding Spring Survey	Siding Spring	5.254	0.088	29.2	4.792	5.716	27 km	–	catalog · MPC · JPL
(160164) 2001 TW_{252}	14 October 2001	Sloan Digital Sky Survey	Apache Point	5.189	0.038	9.8	4.993	5.384	13 km	–	catalog · MPC · JPL
(160465) 2006 BL_{226}	30 January 2006	Spacewatch	Kitt Peak	5.284	0.051	2.7	5.015	5.553	11 km	–	catalog · MPC · JPL
(161646) 2006 BL_{56}	21 January 2006	MLS	Mount Lemmon	5.290	0.052	0.6	5.015	5.565	9.7 km	–	catalog · MPC · JPL
(161664) 2006 DM_{16}	20 February 2006	Spacewatch	Kitt Peak	5.293	0.044	13.4	5.060	5.525	16 km	–	catalog · MPC · JPL
(161916) 2007 EO_{34}	10 March 2007	NEAT	Palomar	5.283	0.065	5.3	4.940	5.626	13 km	–	catalog · MPC · JPL
(175129) 2005 BJ_{19}	16 January 2005	LINEAR	Socorro	5.189	0.022	20.6	5.076	5.301	17 km	–	catalog · MPC · JPL
(177655) 2005 AF_{32}	11 January 2005	LINEAR	Socorro	5.206	0.141	20.9	4.474	5.937	19 km	–	catalog · MPC · JPL
(178268) 2008 AH_{32}	13 January 2008	Spacewatch	Kitt Peak	5.266	0.017	12.0	5.178	5.353	16 km	–	catalog · MPC · JPL
(178291) 1989 UV_{7}	29 October 1989	S. J. Bus	Cerro Tololo	5.172	0.128	18.5	4.509	5.834	15 km	–	catalog · MPC · JPL
(179133) 2001 SF_{293}	19 September 2001	LINEAR	Socorro	5.122	0.044	9.5	4.899	5.346	14 km	–	catalog · MPC · JPL
(179190) 2001 TS_{154}	15 October 2001	NEAT	Palomar	5.144	0.073	11.4	4.769	5.520	16 km	–	catalog · MPC · JPL
(179217) 2001 TB_{225}	14 October 2001	Spacewatch	Kitt Peak	5.166	0.086	0.9	4.723	5.609	8.9 km	–	catalog · MPC · JPL
(179233) 2001 UQ_{60}	17 October 2001	LINEAR	Socorro	5.176	0.098	3.9	4.671	5.682	13 km	–	catalog · MPC · JPL
(179244) 2001 UP_{100}	18 October 2001	LINEAR	Socorro	5.154	0.102	3.6	4.630	5.678	13 km	–	catalog · MPC · JPL
(179902) 2002 VO_{4}	4 November 2002	NEAT	Palomar	5.177	0.077	4.1	4.778	5.576	12 km	–	catalog · MPC · JPL
(180265) 2003 WC_{27}	16 November 2003	Spacewatch	Kitt Peak	5.095	0.048	6.4	4.850	5.341	12 km	–	catalog · MPC · JPL
(180274) 2003 WC_{63}	19 November 2003	Spacewatch	Kitt Peak	5.207	0.029	10.5	5.055	5.359	16 km	–	catalog · MPC · JPL
(181278) 2005 YR_{53}	22 December 2005	Spacewatch	Kitt Peak	5.213	0.080	0.4	4.796	5.630	11 km	–	catalog · MPC · JPL
181279 Iapyx	22 January 2006	J.-C. Merlin	Nogales	5.179	0.061	22.5	4.862	5.495	14 km	–	catalog · MPC · JPL
(181648) 2007 EE_{1}	6 March 2007	NEAT	Palomar	5.142	0.030	3.2	4.986	5.297	12 km	–	catalog · MPC · JPL
(181665) 2008 AG_{32}	12 January 2008	MLS	Mount Lemmon	5.142	0.086	19.8	4.701	5.582	15 km	–	catalog · MPC · JPL
181751 Phaenops	17 April 1996	E. W. Elst	La Silla	5.217	0.092	16.0	4.737	5.698	15 km	–	catalog · MPC · JPL
(181773) 1997 LH_{5}	2 June 1997	Spacewatch	Kitt Peak	5.148	0.073	12.2	4.773	5.522	11 km	–	catalog · MPC · JPL
(182121) 2000 QL_{227}	31 August 2000	LINEAR	Socorro	5.188	0.159	9.9	4.362	6.013	13 km	–	catalog · MPC · JPL
(182161) 2000 SL_{184}	20 September 2000	NEAT	Haleakala	5.220	0.178	7.3	4.288	6.152	16 km	–	catalog · MPC · JPL
(182163) 2000 SO_{193}	24 September 2000	LINEAR	Socorro	5.217	0.105	9.1	4.671	5.763	17 km	–	catalog · MPC · JPL
(182176) 2000 SM_{250}	24 September 2000	LINEAR	Socorro	5.227	0.125	18.1	4.575	5.880	18 km	–	catalog · MPC · JPL
(182178) 2000 SR_{282}	23 September 2000	LINEAR	Socorro	5.205	0.115	25.5	4.607	5.802	15 km	–	catalog · MPC · JPL
(182445) 2001 SD_{30}	16 September 2001	LINEAR	Socorro	5.140	0.059	17.3	4.836	5.445	14 km	–	catalog · MPC · JPL
(182487) 2001 SK_{158}	17 September 2001	LINEAR	Socorro	5.161	0.059	23.0	4.858	5.464	16 km	–	catalog · MPC · JPL
(182506) 2001 SL_{251}	19 September 2001	LINEAR	Socorro	5.185	0.116	9.0	4.584	5.786	18 km	–	catalog · MPC · JPL
(182516) 2001 SK_{293}	19 September 2001	LINEAR	Socorro	5.082	0.064	11.2	4.755	5.408	9.9 km	–	catalog · MPC · JPL
(182522) 2001 SZ_{337}	20 September 2001	LINEAR	Socorro	5.227	0.088	3.5	4.766	5.689	11 km	–	catalog · MPC · JPL
(182541) 2001 TP_{51}	13 October 2001	LINEAR	Socorro	5.105	0.043	8.6	4.887	5.323	12 km	–	catalog · MPC · JPL
(182548) 2001 TS_{83}	14 October 2001	LINEAR	Socorro	5.133	0.046	9.5	4.899	5.367	12 km	–	catalog · MPC · JPL
(182625) 2001 UF_{114}	22 October 2001	LINEAR	Socorro	5.220	0.091	25.7	4.745	5.696	16 km	–	catalog · MPC · JPL
(182627) 2001 UC_{124}	22 October 2001	NEAT	Palomar	5.217	0.051	22.9	4.952	5.482	16 km	–	catalog · MPC · JPL
(182647) 2001 UA_{170}	21 October 2001	LINEAR	Socorro	5.220	0.100	12.2	4.700	5.740	18 km	–	catalog · MPC · JPL
(182666) 2001 UG_{206}	20 October 2001	Spacewatch	Kitt Peak	5.195	0.036	26.0	5.006	5.383	14 km	–	catalog · MPC · JPL
(182669) 2001 UZ_{214}	23 October 2001	Spacewatch	Kitt Peak	5.260	0.047	5.9	5.012	5.509	11 km	–	catalog · MPC · JPL
(182675) 2001 UA_{226}	16 October 2001	NEAT	Palomar	5.231	0.048	10.2	4.981	5.482	13 km	–	catalog · MPC · JPL
(182746) 2001 XV_{105}	10 December 2001	LINEAR	Socorro	5.177	0.095	28.1	4.687	5.667	21 km	–	catalog · MPC · JPL
(183309) 2002 VQ	2 November 2002	J. W. Young	Wrightwood	5.132	0.070	5.6	4.771	5.493	9.9 km	–	catalog · MPC · JPL
(183358) 2002 VM_{131}	13 November 2002	S. F. Hönig	Palomar	5.201	0.094	12.0	4.713	5.688	12 km	–	catalog · MPC · JPL
(184274) 2004 YW_{24}	18 December 2004	MLS	Mount Lemmon	5.145	0.116	26.0	4.547	5.743	12 km	–	catalog · MPC · JPL
(184276) 2005 AU_{19}	6 January 2005	CSS	Catalina	5.200	0.090	10.7	4.731	5.669	15 km	–	catalog · MPC · JPL
184280 Yperion	13 January 2005	Jarnac	Vail-Jarnac	5.246	0.047	3.5	5.001	5.491	9.8 km	–	catalog · MPC · JPL
(184284) 2005 BK_{12}	17 January 2005	Spacewatch	Kitt Peak	5.151	0.066	2.1	4.809	5.493	12 km	–	catalog · MPC · JPL
(184287) 2005 CW_{17}	2 February 2005	LINEAR	Socorro	5.313	0.020	10.0	5.207	5.419	13 km	–	catalog · MPC · JPL
(184306) 2005 ES_{203}	11 March 2005	Spacewatch	Kitt Peak	5.266	0.091	11.2	4.788	5.744	13 km	–	catalog · MPC · JPL
(184829) 2005 UJ	22 October 2005	Spacewatch	Kitt Peak	5.173	0.046	4.7	4.932	5.413	13 km	–	catalog · MPC · JPL
(184929) 2005 VN_{2}	1 November 2005	Spacewatch	Kitt Peak	5.047	0.044	7.3	4.823	5.270	13 km	–	catalog · MPC · JPL
(184937) 2005 VA_{87}	5 November 2005	Spacewatch	Kitt Peak	5.172	0.057	10.6	4.880	5.465	15 km	–	catalog · MPC · JPL
(184975) 2006 BZ_{30}	20 January 2006	Spacewatch	Kitt Peak	5.161	0.006	4.7	5.130	5.192	12 km	–	catalog · MPC · JPL
(184976) 2006 BN_{70}	23 January 2006	Spacewatch	Kitt Peak	5.242	0.070	9.5	4.872	5.611	11 km	–	catalog · MPC · JPL
(184977) 2006 BQ_{110}	25 January 2006	Spacewatch	Kitt Peak	5.145	0.161	11.6	4.320	5.971	12 km	–	catalog · MPC · JPL
(184978) 2006 BM_{121}	26 January 2006	MLS	Mount Lemmon	5.159	0.037	4.5	4.969	5.350	10 km	–	catalog · MPC · JPL
(184979) 2006 BG_{162}	26 January 2006	MLS	Mount Lemmon	5.148	0.074	8.9	4.767	5.529	13 km	–	catalog · MPC · JPL
(184980) 2006 BM_{213}	22 January 2006	CSS	Catalina	5.229	0.099	29.9	4.710	5.748	16 km	–	catalog · MPC · JPL
(184981) 2006 BK_{222}	30 January 2006	Spacewatch	Kitt Peak	5.256	0.103	0.9	4.712	5.799	10 km	–	catalog · MPC · JPL
(184982) 2006 BV_{252}	31 January 2006	Spacewatch	Kitt Peak	5.242	0.090	2.7	4.772	5.713	11 km	–	catalog · MPC · JPL
(184983) 2006 CS_{19}	1 February 2006	MLS	Mount Lemmon	5.209	0.067	11.9	4.859	5.559	11 km	–	catalog · MPC · JPL
(184984) 2006 CQ_{31}	2 February 2006	Spacewatch	Kitt Peak	5.221	0.081	7.2	4.799	5.643	13 km	–	catalog · MPC · JPL
(184985) 2006 CC_{51}	4 February 2006	Spacewatch	Kitt Peak	5.053	0.095	4.8	4.573	5.532	9.9 km	–	catalog · MPC · JPL
(184986) 2006 DW_{143}	25 February 2006	MLS	Mount Lemmon	5.221	0.098	2.7	4.709	5.733	10 km	–	catalog · MPC · JPL
(184988) 2006 FF_{12}	23 March 2006	CSS	Catalina	5.301	0.069	13.9	4.934	5.668	16 km	–	catalog · MPC · JPL
(185485) 2007 EL_{68}	10 March 2007	Spacewatch	Kitt Peak	5.211	0.029	4.2	5.061	5.362	10 km	–	catalog · MPC · JPL
(185486) 2007 EP_{75}	10 March 2007	Spacewatch	Kitt Peak	5.247	0.071	14.8	4.876	5.617	12 km	–	catalog · MPC · JPL
(185487) 2007 ED_{139}	12 March 2007	Spacewatch	Kitt Peak	5.221	0.060	5.3	4.906	5.535	12 km	–	catalog · MPC · JPL
(185489) 2007 FK_{33}	25 March 2007	MLS	Mount Lemmon	5.135	0.015	2.2	5.058	5.211	9.9 km	–	catalog · MPC · JPL
(185490) 2007 GR_{1}	9 April 2007	Bergen-Enkheim	Bergen-Enkheim	5.110	0.017	30.3	5.023	5.197	16 km	–	catalog · MPC · JPL
(185492) 2007 HA_{8}	18 April 2007	LONEOS	Anderson Mesa	5.274	0.041	19.1	5.058	5.489	12 km	–	catalog · MPC · JPL
(185666) 1995 FT_{9}	26 March 1995	Spacewatch	Kitt Peak	5.284	0.098	14.2	4.766	5.803	14 km	–	catalog · MPC · JPL
(185693) 1997 HV_{3}	30 April 1997	Spacewatch	Kitt Peak	5.186	0.125	16.2	4.536	5.835	15 km	–	catalog · MPC · JPL
(185906) 2000 SF_{94}	23 September 2000	LINEAR	Socorro	5.198	0.079	8.6	4.789	5.606	16 km	–	catalog · MPC · JPL
(185919) 2000 SM_{284}	23 September 2000	LINEAR	Socorro	5.237	0.085	13.4	4.790	5.684	11 km	–	catalog · MPC · JPL
(186106) 2001 TW_{56}	14 October 2001	LINEAR	Socorro	5.225	0.033	7.5	5.053	5.396	12 km	–	catalog · MPC · JPL
(186125) 2001 TM_{150}	10 October 2001	NEAT	Palomar	5.185	0.053	13.2	4.908	5.463	15 km	–	catalog · MPC · JPL
(186128) 2001 TP_{154}	15 October 2001	NEAT	Palomar	5.174	0.013	12.2	5.105	5.244	14 km	–	catalog · MPC · JPL
(186138) 2001 TK_{206}	11 October 2001	NEAT	Palomar	5.205	0.006	5.1	5.176	5.234	12 km	–	catalog · MPC · JPL
(186272) 2001 YZ_{140}	17 December 2001	LINEAR	Socorro	5.208	0.125	8.2	4.559	5.857	11 km	–	catalog · MPC · JPL
(186544) 2002 WT_{23}	24 November 2002	NEAT	Palomar	5.159	0.093	9.7	4.680	5.638	12 km	–	catalog · MPC · JPL
(187018) 2004 YC_{25}	18 December 2004	MLS	Mount Lemmon	5.151	0.055	10.5	4.866	5.435	10 km	–	catalog · MPC · JPL
(187019) 2004 YU_{36}	20 December 2004	MLS	Mount Lemmon	5.252	0.055	12.2	4.964	5.540	15 km	–	catalog · MPC · JPL
(187020) 2005 AZ_{63}	13 January 2005	Spacewatch	Kitt Peak	5.104	0.064	9.4	4.777	5.431	10 km	–	catalog · MPC · JPL
(187021) 2005 AU_{66}	13 January 2005	Spacewatch	Kitt Peak	5.205	0.139	10.1	4.480	5.930	13 km	–	catalog · MPC · JPL
(187024) 2005 BN_{13}	17 January 2005	Spacewatch	Kitt Peak	5.188	0.030	13.7	5.032	5.345	14 km	–	catalog · MPC · JPL
(187436) 2005 WN_{57}	30 November 2005	Spacewatch	Kitt Peak	5.307	0.113	20.4	4.706	5.909	17 km	–	catalog · MPC · JPL
(187456) 2005 XK_{5}	4 December 2005	Spacewatch	Kitt Peak	5.205	0.097	7.7	4.699	5.712	14 km	–	catalog · MPC · JPL
(187463) 2005 XX_{106}	1 December 2005	M. W. Buie	Kitt Peak	5.181	0.028	5.9	5.037	5.325	14 km	–	catalog · MPC · JPL
(187469) 2006 BL_{53}	25 January 2006	Spacewatch	Kitt Peak	5.165	0.111	18.4	4.591	5.739	14 km	–	catalog · MPC · JPL
(187470) 2006 BH_{59}	23 January 2006	MLS	Mount Lemmon	5.214	0.064	10.9	4.881	5.548	11 km	–	catalog · MPC · JPL
(187471) 2006 BV_{72}	23 January 2006	Spacewatch	Kitt Peak	5.265	0.068	8.3	4.908	5.621	11 km	–	catalog · MPC · JPL
(187472) 2006 BP_{73}	23 January 2006	Spacewatch	Kitt Peak	5.239	0.189	5.9	4.251	6.227	9.9 km	–	catalog · MPC · JPL
(187473) 2006 BJ_{103}	23 January 2006	MLS	Mount Lemmon	5.126	0.007	9.8	5.089	5.162	8.3 km	–	catalog · MPC · JPL
(187474) 2006 BM_{116}	26 January 2006	Spacewatch	Kitt Peak	5.109	0.064	3.7	4.784	5.434	13 km	–	catalog · MPC · JPL
(187475) 2006 BV_{119}	26 January 2006	Spacewatch	Kitt Peak	5.245	0.100	11.2	4.719	5.772	18 km	–	catalog · MPC · JPL
(187476) 2006 BB_{213}	30 January 2006	W. Bickel	Bergisch Gladbach	5.248	0.066	17.9	4.903	5.593	16 km	–	catalog · MPC · JPL
(187478) 2006 CY_{29}	2 February 2006	Spacewatch	Kitt Peak	5.145	0.036	4.4	4.961	5.328	12 km	–	catalog · MPC · JPL
(187479) 2006 DA_{15}	20 February 2006	Spacewatch	Kitt Peak	5.221	0.092	6.8	4.741	5.701	14 km	–	catalog · MPC · JPL
(187607) 2006 YB_{13}	21 December 2006	Spacewatch	Kitt Peak	5.269	0.053	17.8	4.991	5.548	19 km	–	catalog · MPC · JPL
(187655) 2007 EZ_{103}	11 March 2007	MLS	Mount Lemmon	5.206	0.097	17.0	4.701	5.712	13 km	–	catalog · MPC · JPL
(187656) 2007 EM_{107}	11 March 2007	Spacewatch	Kitt Peak	5.298	0.051	9.3	5.026	5.570	10 km	–	catalog · MPC · JPL
(187657) 2007 ER_{148}	12 March 2007	MLS	Mount Lemmon	5.245	0.032	9.5	5.079	5.412	11 km	–	catalog · MPC · JPL
(187659) 2007 EN_{186}	15 March 2007	MLS	Mount Lemmon	5.139	0.075	8.1	4.756	5.523	12 km	–	catalog · MPC · JPL
(187692) 2008 DM_{56}	29 February 2008	Spacewatch	Kitt Peak	5.223	0.019	27.3	5.121	5.324	15 km	–	catalog · MPC · JPL
(187724) 2008 FC_{38}	28 March 2008	Spacewatch	Kitt Peak	5.217	0.132	8.3	4.527	5.907	15 km	–	catalog · MPC · JPL
(187755) 1996 HN_{17}	18 April 1996	E. W. Elst	La Silla	5.268	0.099	4.6	4.745	5.790	12 km	–	catalog · MPC · JPL
(188006) 2001 SF_{317}	25 September 2001	NEAT	Palomar	5.215	0.054	26.6	4.933	5.496	15 km	–	catalog · MPC · JPL
(188020) 2001 TH_{257}	10 October 2001	NEAT	Palomar	5.122	0.049	19.8	4.869	5.375	14 km	–	catalog · MPC · JPL
(188026) 2001 UE_{79}	20 October 2001	LINEAR	Socorro	5.228	0.043	22.2	5.004	5.451	14 km	–	catalog · MPC · JPL
(188053) 2001 VM_{83}	10 November 2001	LINEAR	Socorro	5.210	0.087	26.9	4.759	5.662	15 km	–	catalog · MPC · JPL
(188060) 2001 VG_{127}	11 November 2001	Sloan Digital Sky Survey	Apache Point	5.169	0.027	11.1	5.027	5.311	12 km	–	catalog · MPC · JPL
(188083) 2001 XM_{126}	14 December 2001	LINEAR	Socorro	5.360	0.065	5.6	5.009	5.711	14 km	–	catalog · MPC · JPL
(188234) 2002 UO_{74}	30 October 2002	NEAT	Palomar	5.120	0.071	14.1	4.759	5.482	9.7 km	–	catalog · MPC · JPL
(188247) 2002 WS_{23}	24 November 2002	NEAT	Palomar	5.222	0.055	6.8	4.933	5.512	15 km	–	catalog · MPC · JPL
(188257) 2002 XM_{117}	10 December 2002	NEAT	Palomar	5.198	0.036	15.6	5.011	5.385	13 km	–	catalog · MPC · JPL
(188373) 2004 BZ_{132}	17 January 2004	Spacewatch	Kitt Peak	5.340	0.071	14.0	4.962	5.718	12 km	–	catalog · MPC · JPL
(188574) 2004 YC_{22}	18 December 2004	MLS	Mount Lemmon	5.196	0.048	16.6	4.949	5.443	9.9 km	–	catalog · MPC · JPL
(188835) 2006 BP_{90}	25 January 2006	Spacewatch	Kitt Peak	5.209	0.032	10.6	5.042	5.377	8.3 km	–	catalog · MPC · JPL
(188836) 2006 BK_{159}	26 January 2006	Spacewatch	Kitt Peak	5.159	0.069	4.1	4.803	5.514	10 km	–	catalog · MPC · JPL
(188837) 2006 BN_{194}	30 January 2006	Spacewatch	Kitt Peak	5.218	0.114	4.4	4.621	5.816	13 km	–	catalog · MPC · JPL
(188841) 2006 DZ_{39}	22 February 2006	Spacewatch	Kitt Peak	5.258	0.113	8.2	4.666	5.850	11 km	–	catalog · MPC · JPL
(188842) 2006 DP_{129}	25 February 2006	Spacewatch	Kitt Peak	5.198	0.032	9.0	5.031	5.365	9.2 km	–	catalog · MPC · JPL
(188843) 2006 DX_{131}	25 February 2006	Spacewatch	Kitt Peak	5.262	0.044	4.7	5.029	5.495	9.8 km	–	catalog · MPC · JPL
(188844) 2006 DH_{157}	27 February 2006	Spacewatch	Kitt Peak	5.258	0.033	9.6	5.084	5.432	8.8 km	–	catalog · MPC · JPL
(188845) 2006 DK_{189}	27 February 2006	Spacewatch	Kitt Peak	5.316	0.060	12.1	4.999	5.633	11 km	–	catalog · MPC · JPL
(188846) 2006 EV_{25}	3 March 2006	Spacewatch	Kitt Peak	5.172	0.015	11.3	5.092	5.252	12 km	–	catalog · MPC · JPL
188847 Rhipeus	23 March 2006	Calvin College	Calvin-Rehoboth	5.183	0.061	7.1	4.864	5.501	9.4 km	–	catalog · MPC · JPL
(188942) 2007 DD_{8}	21 February 2007	Farpoint	Eskridge	5.218	0.123	19.0	4.575	5.862	14 km	–	catalog · MPC · JPL
(188952) 2007 EA_{73}	10 March 2007	Spacewatch	Kitt Peak	5.184	0.025	13.7	5.053	5.315	14 km	–	catalog · MPC · JPL
(188965) 2007 YY_{56}	31 December 2007	Spacewatch	Kitt Peak	5.196	0.130	19.5	4.519	5.873	16 km	–	catalog · MPC · JPL
(188966) 2008 AQ_{101}	13 January 2008	Spacewatch	Kitt Peak	5.204	0.069	12.9	4.844	5.565	17 km	–	catalog · MPC · JPL
(188976) 2008 EP_{68}	7 March 2008	MLS	Mount Lemmon	5.232	0.077	30.6	4.829	5.635	18 km	–	catalog · MPC · JPL
(188986) 2008 FY_{88}	28 March 2008	Spacewatch	Kitt Peak	5.186	0.043	4.7	4.964	5.409	9.7 km	–	catalog · MPC · JPL
189004 Capys	16 October 1977	C. J. van Houten; I. van Houten-Groeneveld; T. Gehrels	Palomar	5.183	0.146	17.1	4.425	5.940	11 km	–	catalog · MPC · JPL
(189214) 2003 YJ_{20}	17 December 2003	Spacewatch	Kitt Peak	5.279	0.034	18.7	5.102	5.456	13 km	–	catalog · MPC · JPL
(189215) 2003 YF_{162}	17 December 2003	LINEAR	Socorro	5.184	0.047	22.3	4.941	5.426	15 km	–	catalog · MPC · JPL
189310 Polydamas	3 January 2006	I. R. Ferrín	Merida	5.263	0.076	10.5	4.862	5.665	14 km	–	catalog · MPC · JPL
(189377) 2008 FU_{78}	27 March 2008	MLS	Mount Lemmon	5.184	0.008	9.3	5.144	5.225	13 km	–	catalog · MPC · JPL
(189386) 2008 GX_{49}	5 April 2008	Spacewatch	Kitt Peak	5.141	0.046	12.5	4.904	5.378	14 km	–	catalog · MPC · JPL
(192262) 2008 HO_{8}	24 April 2008	Spacewatch	Kitt Peak	5.176	0.119	22.3	4.560	5.792	12 km	–	catalog · MPC · JPL
(192268) 2008 LD_{12}	7 June 2008	Spacewatch	Kitt Peak	5.236	0.054	13.6	4.954	5.519	10 km	–	catalog · MPC · JPL

back to top
