= Berger Warte =

16th century tower, Frankfurt, Germany

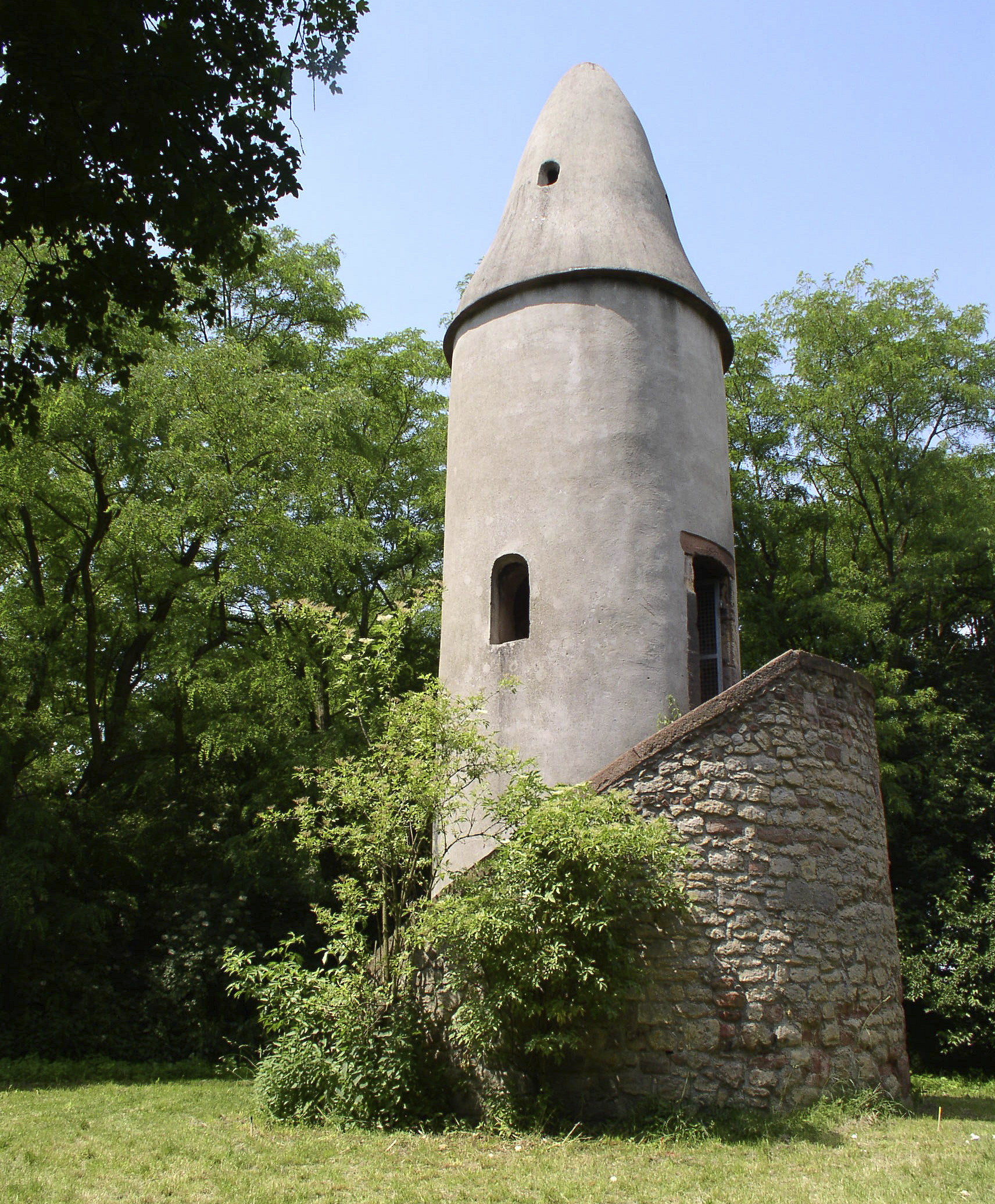
Berger Warte, at the highest point of elevation of the Frankfurt city area

The Berger Warte is a guard tower first built in the 16th century on top of the hill with the same name "Berger Warte" (a part of the chain "Berger Rücken"). The tower is around twelve meters tall and built from red Main sandstone. It is located at the highest point of elevation (212m) of what today are the city limits of Frankfurt am Main, at the border of the two districts Seckbach and Bergen-Enkheim.

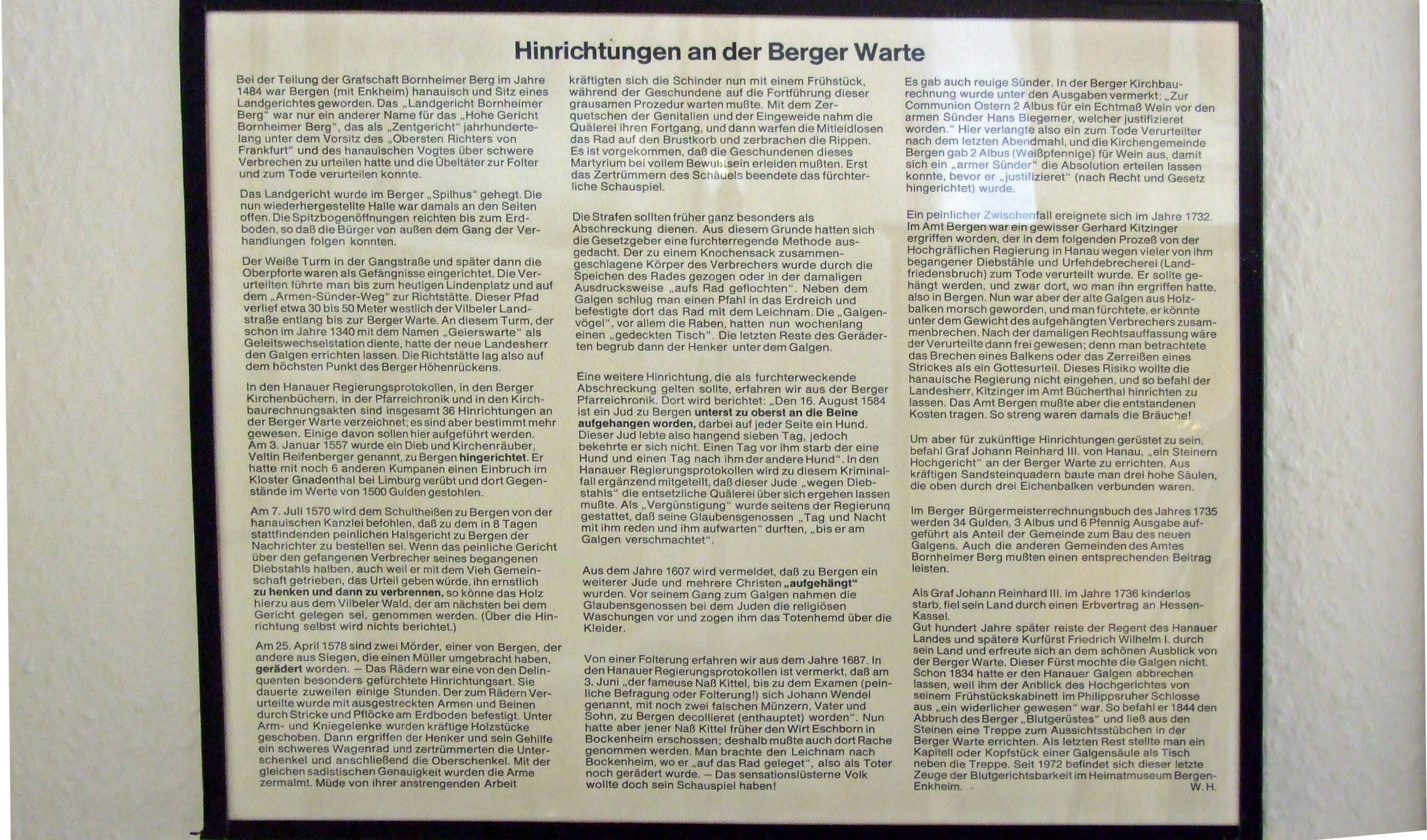
An exhibit at Bergen-Enkheimer Heimatmuseum (local museum), chronicling the history of the Berger gallows

As opposed to the other four remaining medieval guard towers in the city of Frankfurt, the Berger Warte was not part of the system of the Frankfurter Landwehr. The Frankfurter Landwehr was a system of defenses that were built at a distance of around two kilometers around the city of Frankfurt in the late 14th century, as a first line of defense for the city. Rather, the Berger Warte served as an observation post between the city of Frankfurt and Bischofsheim. Armed escorts provided to traders by the city of Frankfurt would stop at the Berger Warte. At the time it was located on land belonging to the nobles of Hanau.

Today the Berger Warte is protected under Hessian monument protection law.

== History ==
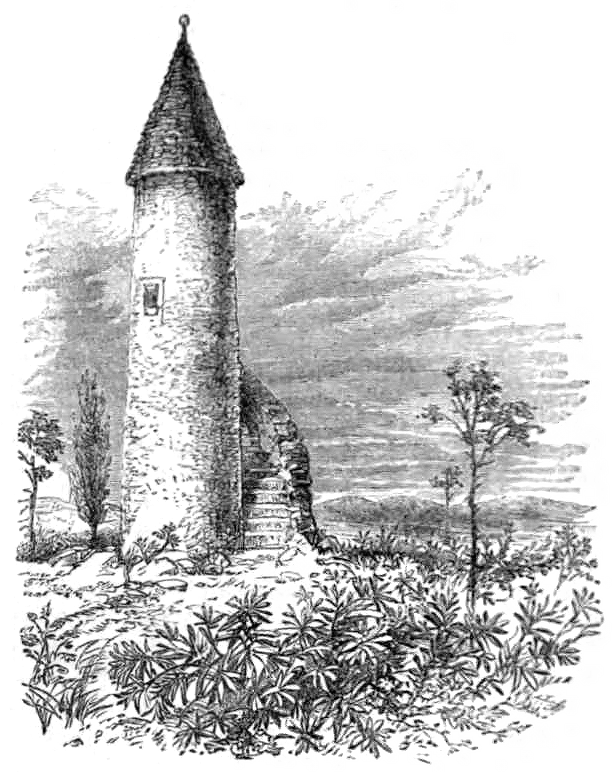
1862 view of the old watchtower the Berger Warte on a hill near the former town of Bergen. From a magazine article. Once a Week, volume 7, page 473.

Reports of an initial wooden guard tower first reference the year 1340 which refers to the tower as the Gyriswarte (modern German: Geisterwarte; English: Ghost guard tower). This tower was burned down in 1552 during the siege of Frankfurt by Albert Alcibiades Margrave of Brandenburg-Kulmbach. It was however rebuilt out of stone in 1557 following orders by Phillip III of Hanau-Münzenberg.

The entrance to the tower is located on the first floor. Until the construction of a staircase in the 19th century, the tower was entered via a ladder which could be pulled into the tower in cases of emergency. Other fortifications included a simple trench with palisades that surrounded the tower in a radius of about twelve meters.

During the seven-year war, the French Marshall de Broglie commanded his troops from the Berger Warte during the Battle of Bergen on the 13th of April 1559. His victory at the battle prevented an invasion of Frankfurt by the Prussians.

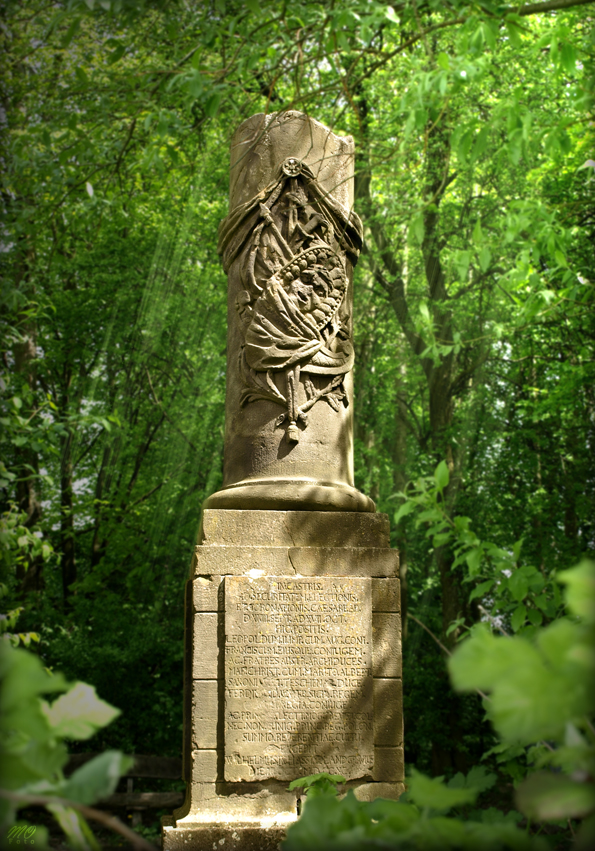
Leopold column, approximately 370m from the Berger Warte

From the 23rd of September until the 17th of October 1790 a 5000 to 6000-strong army of the count of Hessen-Kassel was stationed at the Berger Warte (although some sources put the number at 1700) under the command of Wilhelm IX (later Electoral Prince Wilhelm I). The purpose of this army was to protect the imperial election from contemporary revolutionary tendencies. On the 30th of September, 300 canon shots from Frankfurt announced the election of Leopold II to the position of Emperor of the Holy Roman Empire. The Hessian troops responded with a volley of honour. On the 11th of October, two days after the coronation, the Emperor visited the Electoral Princes as well as other high guests at the Berger Warte. The Leopold column (German: Leopoldsäule) that was built close to the Berger Warte commemorates this event.

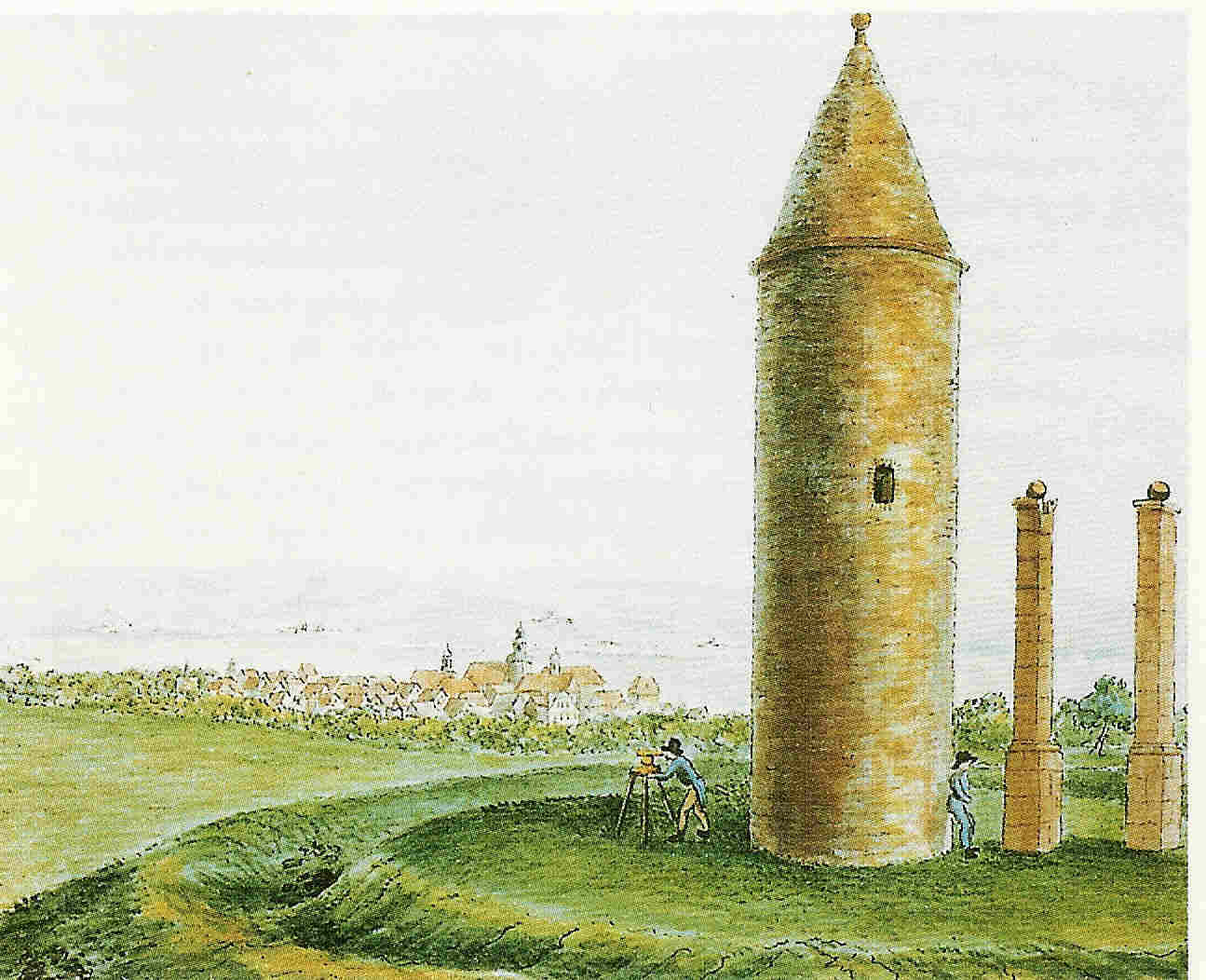
Berger Warte around 1820, drawing by Friedrich Philipp Usener. On the right, two of the pillars of the Berger gallows can be seen

From 1484 until 1834, the Berger Warte was also the place of execution for the high court of the county Bornheimer Berg. The gallows placed there saw the execution of 36 convicted. Up until the divide of the county between Frankfurt and Hanau in 1484, the place of execution had been in Bornheim at the gallows hill (German: Galgenberg). In 1735, the wooden gallows were replaced with one constructed from stone. According to some stories, the gallows were demolished because their sight "disgusted" the Electoral Prince when having breakfast in the Rumpenheim castle (German: Rumpenheimer Schloss). Still today in city plans the closest street is called "Am Galgen" (English: At the Gallows).

Slightly below the highest point of the Berger Warte, an important historic trade road named Via Regia connects Mainz to Frankfurt and to Silesia (in the Frankfurt area, this street is also known as the Hohe Straße [English: high street - referencing its path along the height of the Berger Rücken]).

During World War II the Berger Warte was damaged but the damages were repaired in the 1950s.
