= Bergen-Enkheim =

- Borough of Frankfurt am Main
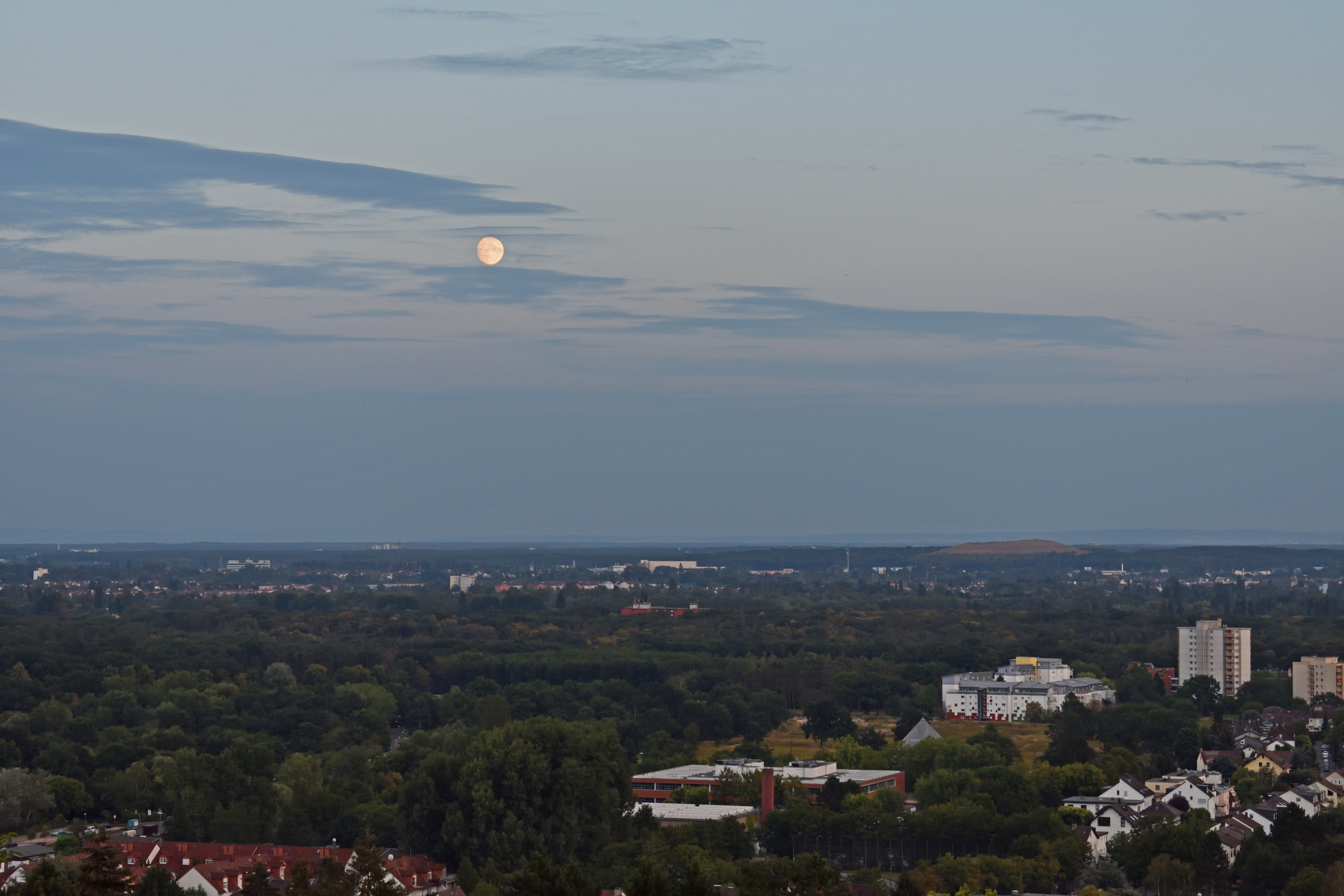
- Southern part of Bergen-Enkheim and Enkheimer Wald

- Coat of arms

- Location of Bergen-Enkheim within Frankfurt am Main
- Interactive map of Bergen-Enkheim
- Location within Germany Location within Hesse
- Coordinates: 50°09′18″N 08°45′11″E
- Country: Germany
- State: Hesse
- Admin. region: Darmstadt
- District: Urban district
- City: Frankfurt am Main

Area
  - Total: 12.541 km^{2} (4.842 sq mi)

Population (31 December 2020)
  - Total: 17,988
  - Density: 1,434.3/km^{2} (3,714.9/sq mi)
- Time zone: UTC+01:00 (CET)
  - Summer (DST): UTC+02:00 (CEST)
- Postal codes: 60388
- Dialling codes: 06109
- Vehicle registration: F
- Website: www.bergenenkheim.de

Bergen-Enkheim (German pronunciation: [ˈbɛʁɡn̩ ˈʔɛŋkhaɪm]) is a borough (Ortsbezirk) of Frankfurt am Main, Germany.

Bergen-Enkheim is a popular residential area with families and sports enthusiasts for its small-town character, excellent infrastructure, and the highest number of clubs (Vereine) in Frankfurt, many of them sports clubs. Its athletic facilities include a modern track and field complex, a tennis club, an extensive, recently modernized indoor and outdoor public swimming and sports center, and a nature preserve with small lakes and many kilometers of forested walking, running and biking paths (Enkheimer Ried). The southern side of the Berger Rücken, once covered with vineyards, is now one of Frankfurt's premier residential districts, the Berger Hang.

The district in the eastern part of Frankfurt was once formed from the independent towns of Bergen and Enkheim. It borders the districts of Seckbach in the west and Fechenheim in the south, the town of Maintal in the east and the town of Bad Vilbel in the north.

Bergen and Enkheim were first mentioned as a common village in the thirteenth century. The two locations were administered together for centuries in 1936, but Bergen-Enkheim only officially became a town in 1968. In 1977 it was incorporated into the city of Frankfurt.

Geographically the territory is marked by the transition of the Main valley into the rising Wetterau.

It is directly linked to the Rhine-Main area's RMV U-Bahn and bus network.

== Culture ==
Bergen-Enkheim is a district connected to literature, and the literary prize, the Stadtschreiber von Bergen, is awarded as a part of the market Berger Markt every year (Friday before the first Tuesday in September).

The Arabidopsis thaliana race Enkheim, which is important in plant molecular biology research originates here.

== Sights ==
The old town of Bergen is an interesting site. Its historic town hall holds the area's historical museum. The Gothic foundation of the building dates from 1300 to 1350 and the upper floor in the rural Renaissance style dates from the early sixteenth century. It also holds a tower holding a baroque lantern, added in 1704.

A remnant of the old city walls frames the so-called "White Tower" (Weiße Turm). This was a late gothic watchtower which was created under the counts of Hanau along the town walls.

On top of the hill there is also the Berger Warte, a 16th century observation tower that also used to be the site of the Berger gallows.

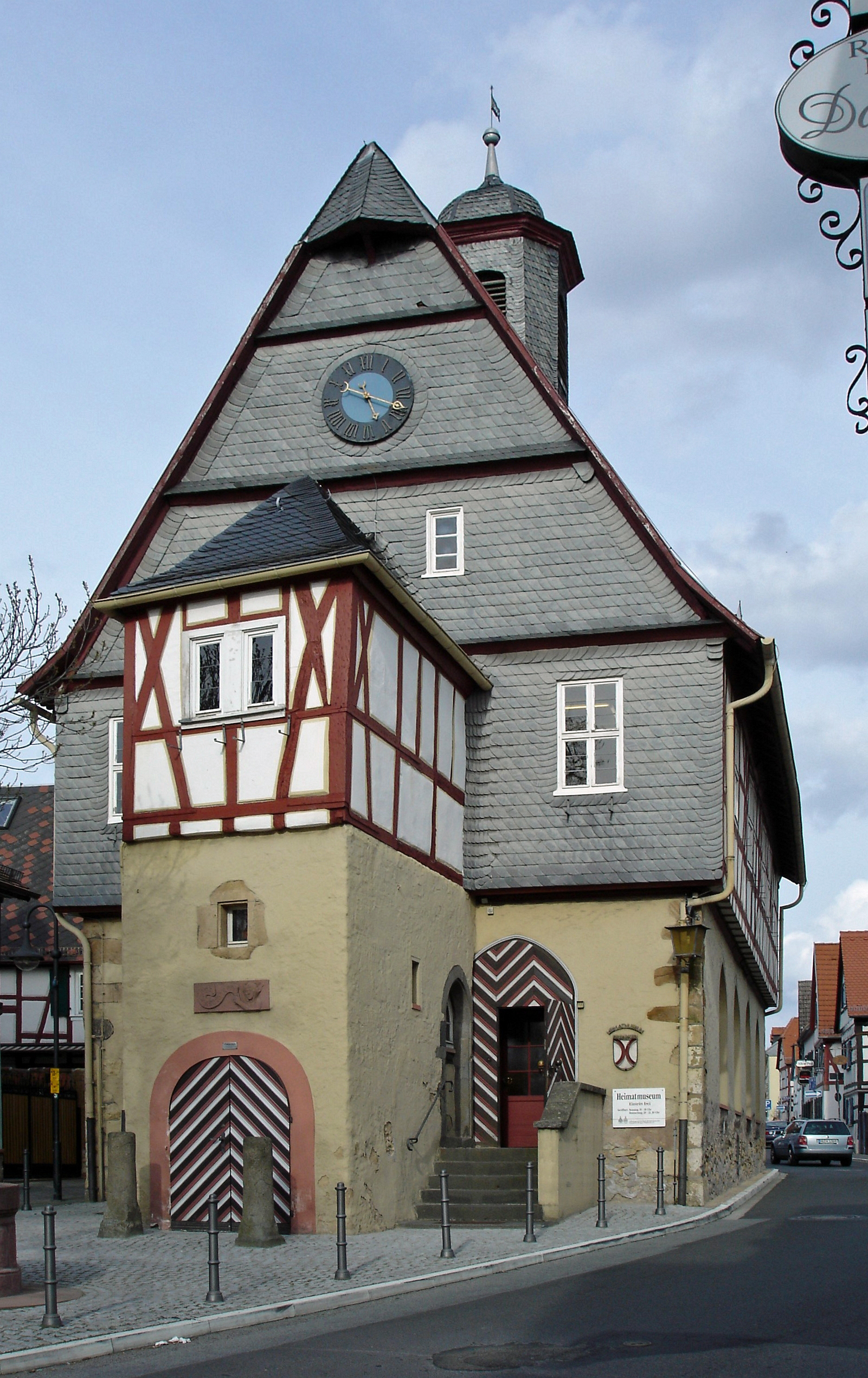
Entrance of "Heimatmuseum" in Bergen

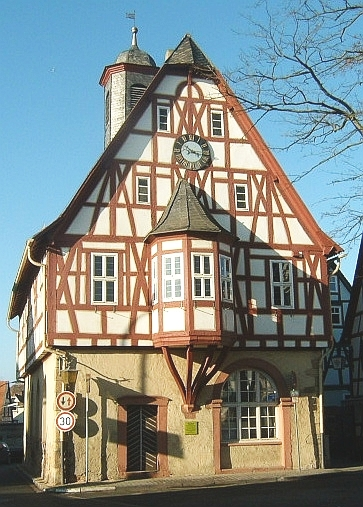
Rear side of "Heimatmuseum"

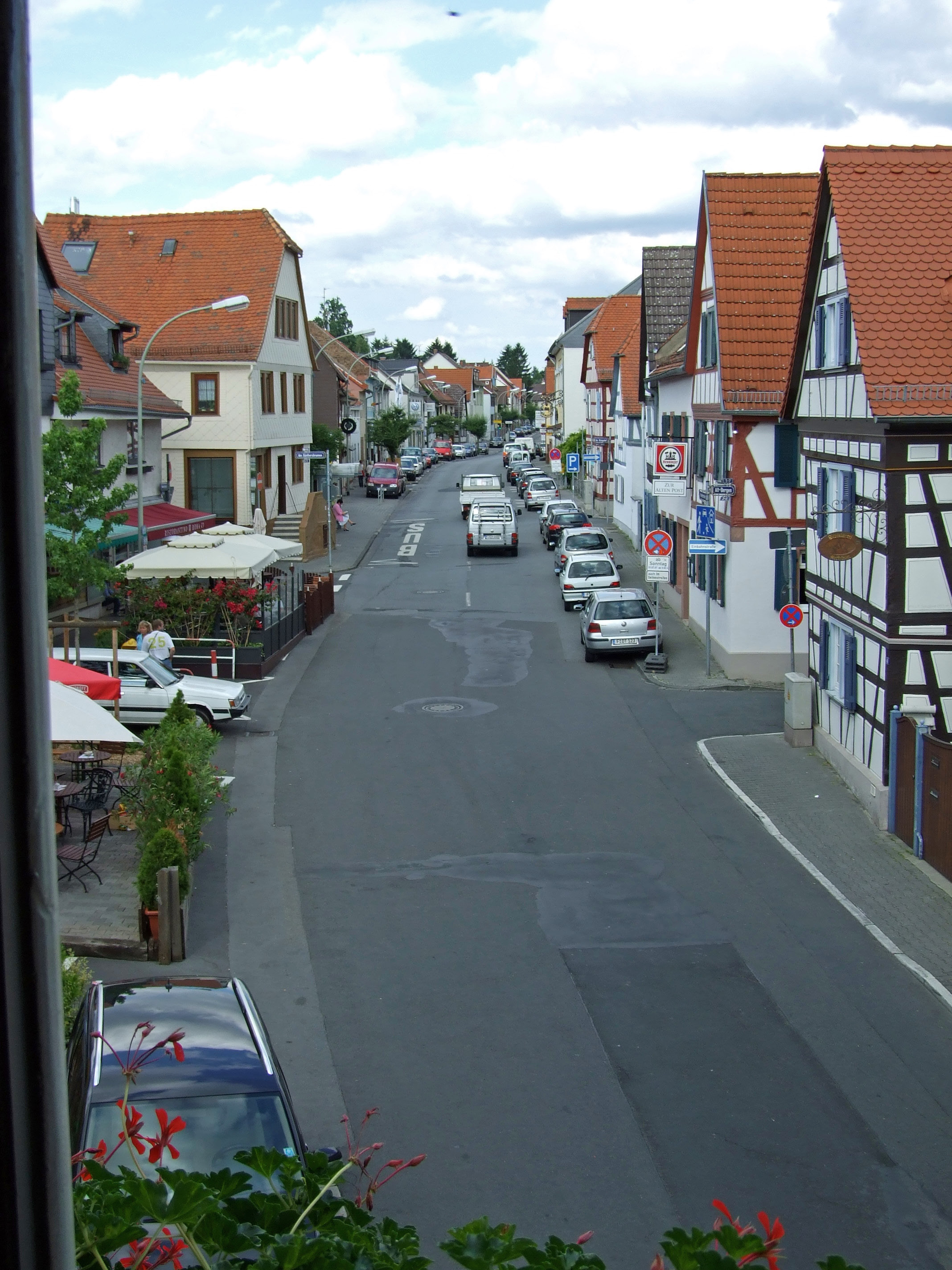
view from Heimatmuseum

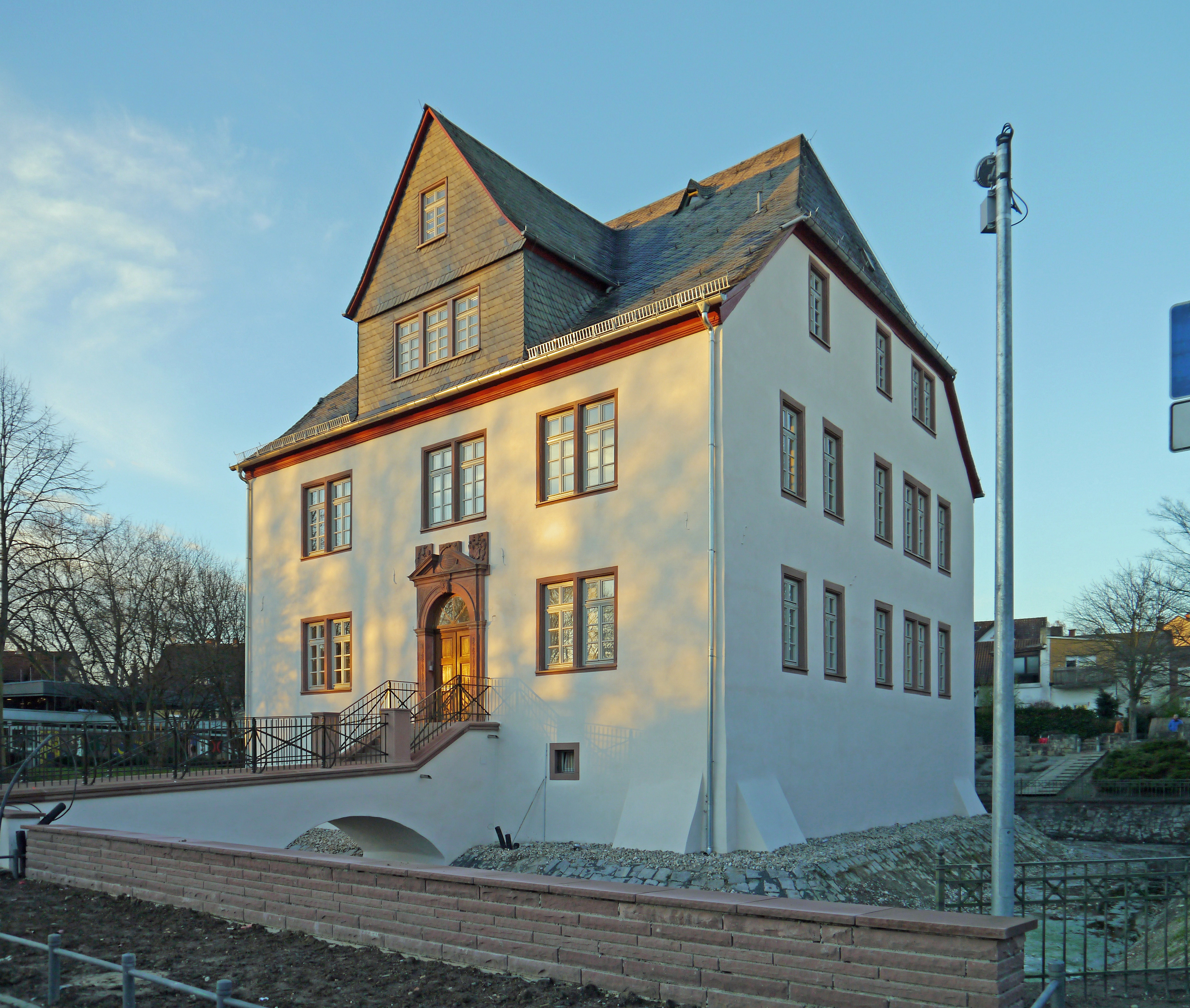
"Schelmenburg" with Schloßbornquelle (spring) (Bergen)

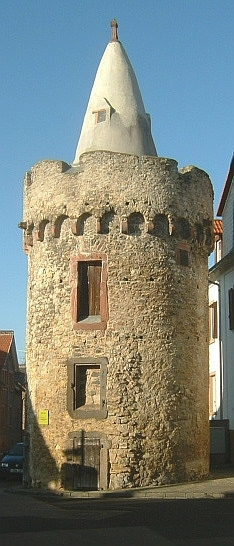
"Weisser Turm" (White Tower) Part of the castle wall in Bergen

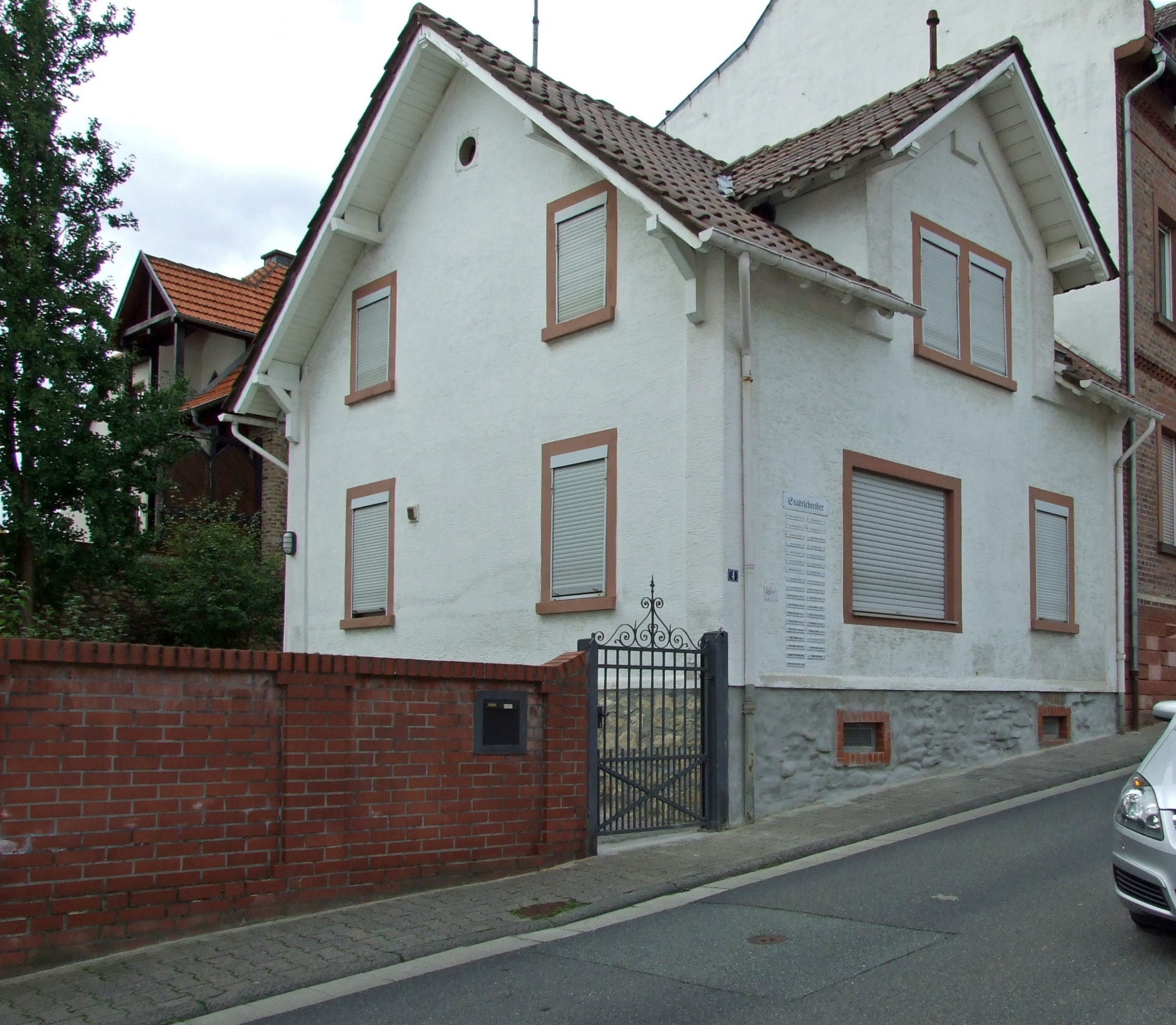
Stadtschreiberhaus in Bergen

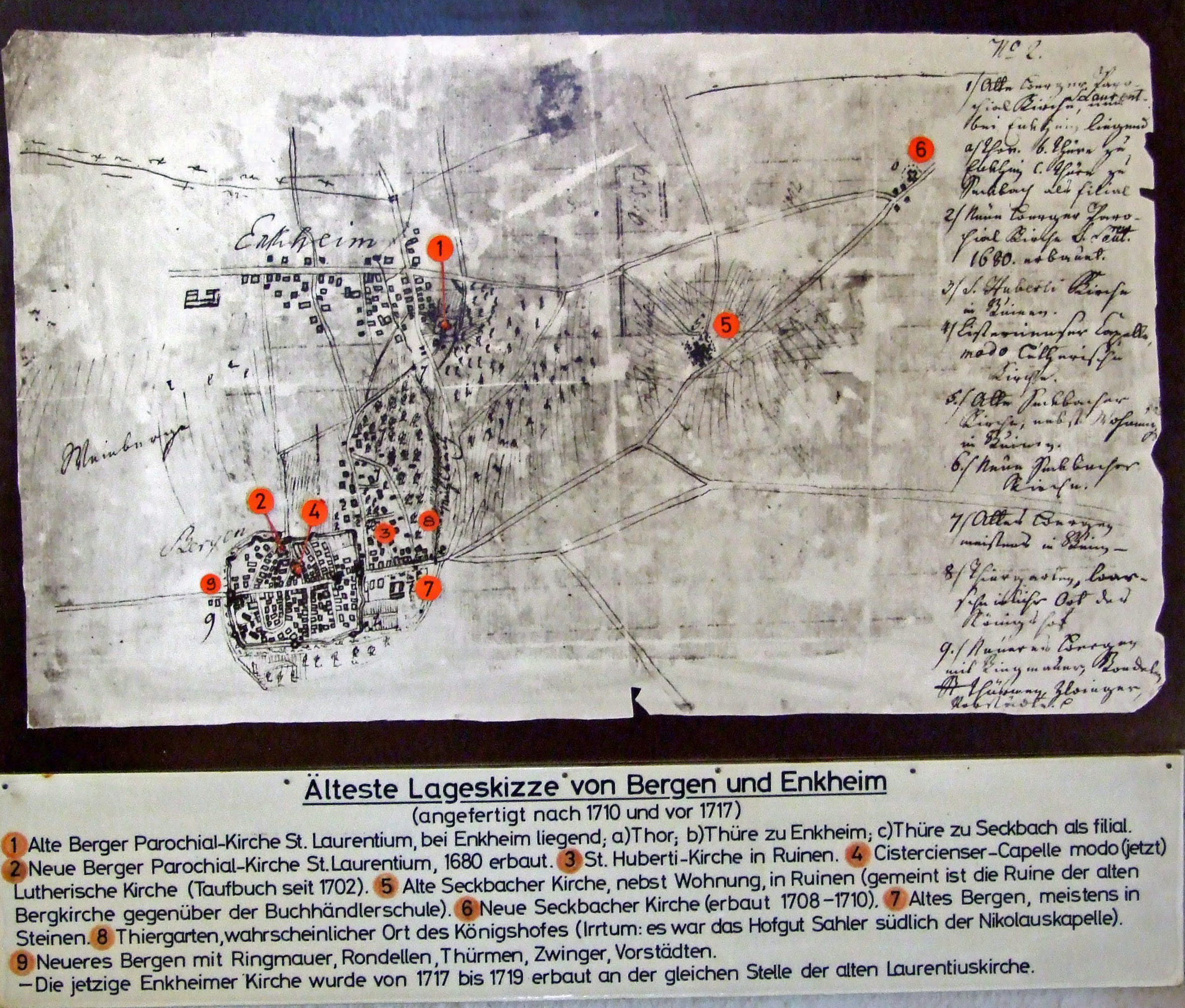
old map at Heimatmuseum

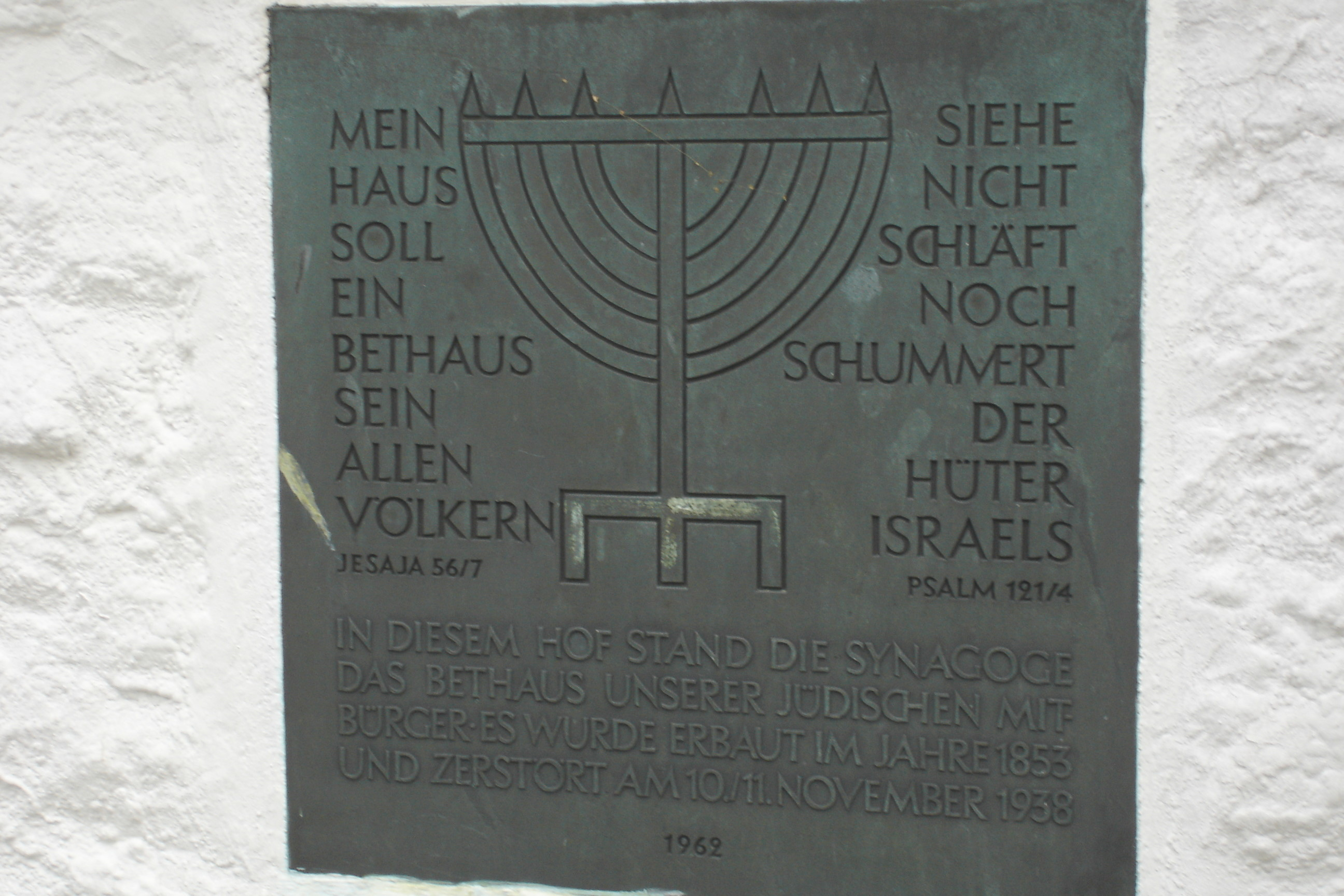
commemorative plaque about synagogue

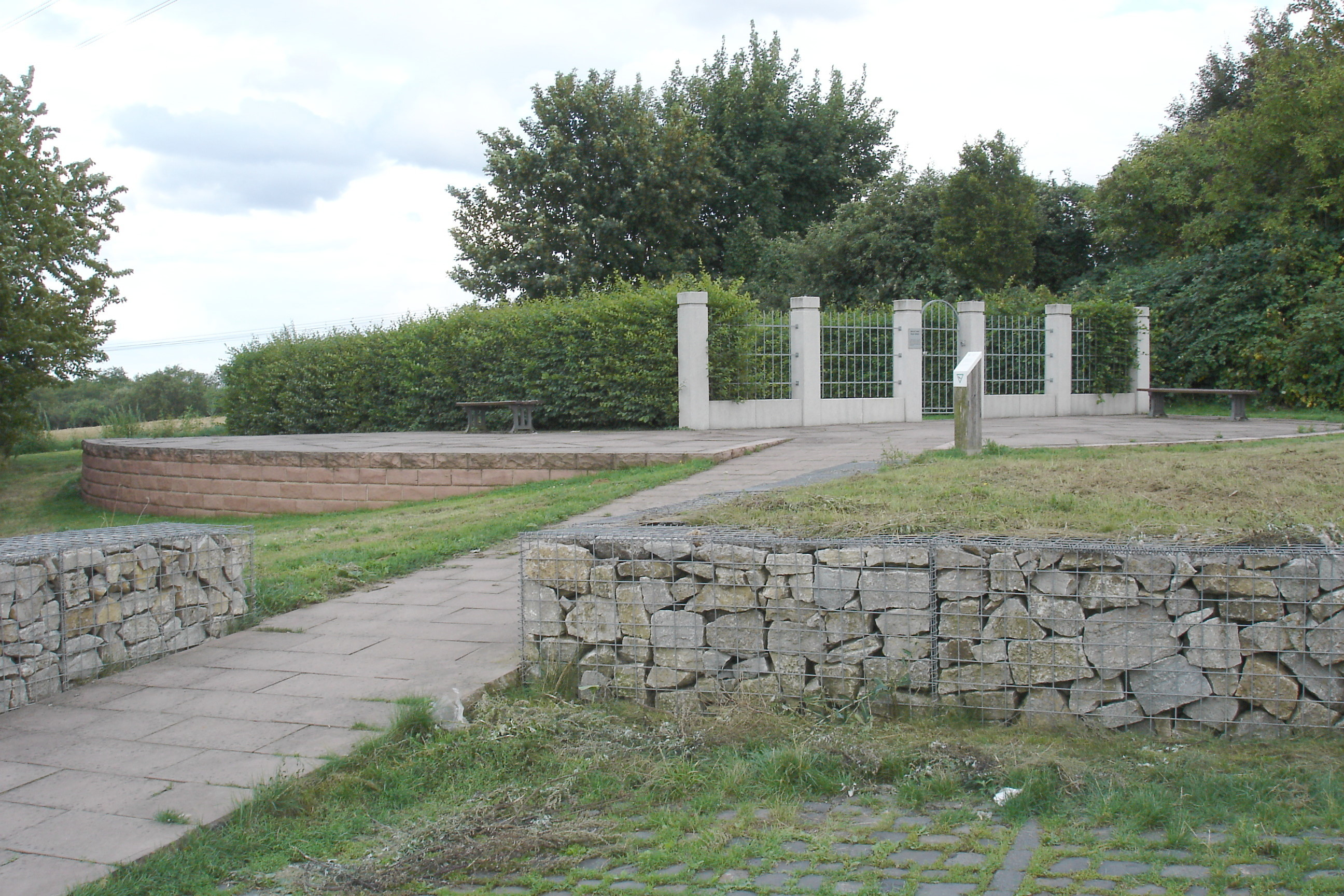
Jewish cemetery

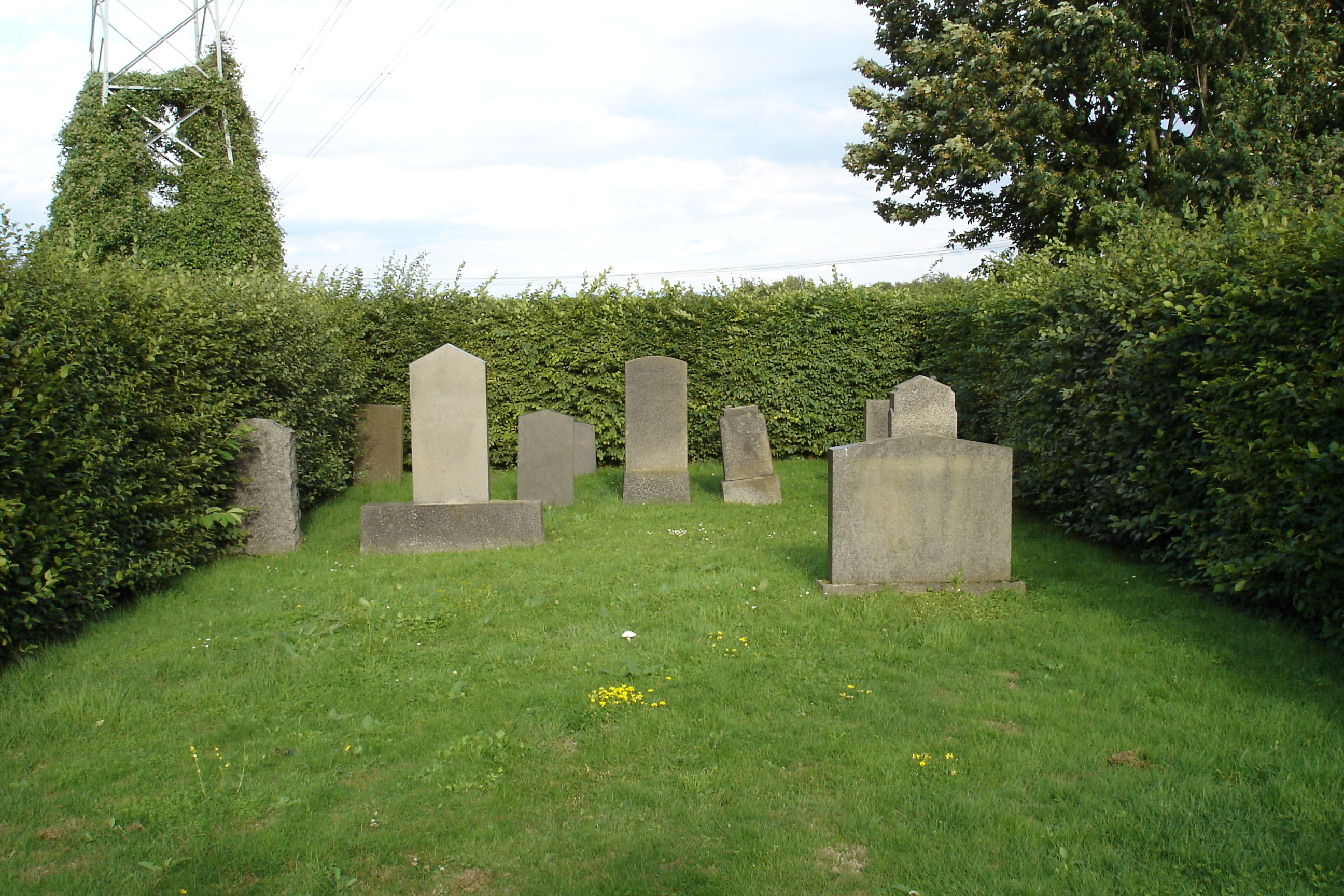
Jewish cemetery

== Economy and infrastructure ==
=== Local businesses ===
Equinix (data centers), Nord-Micro (aerospace), Sun Chemical (printing inks for food packaging) and the German innovation campus of the French gas manufacturer Air Liquide have business locations in Bergen-Enkheim. The local trade association comprises 140 businesses. The Hessen-Center is a major shopping mall.

=== Infrastructure and events ===
Sport facilities include an extensive, recently modernized public indoor and outdoor pool with 50m lap pool and diving pool and sports center, a modern athletics facility, a tennis club with nine outdoor courts and Frankfurt's most modern indoor hall, which can also be rented by non-members, a pump track, an E-kart track and a nature preserve with small lakes and kilometers of wooded hiking, running and cycling paths, the Enkheimer Ried.

Regular sport events include a road race (Volkslauf), a triathlon as well as a big sports and fun day for children and young people.

Every year the trade association Bergen-Enkheim organizes a trade show and the Christmas market.

Bergen-Enkheim holds the only county fair in the greater city of Frankfurt. It is location of the Berger Market (Berger Markt) that takes place in the last weekend in August. On the Friday beforehand, the new Stadtschreiber von Bergen is inducted and celebrated. The festival pavilion is also used to crown the official Apfelwein (Cider) Queen.

== Fairground ==
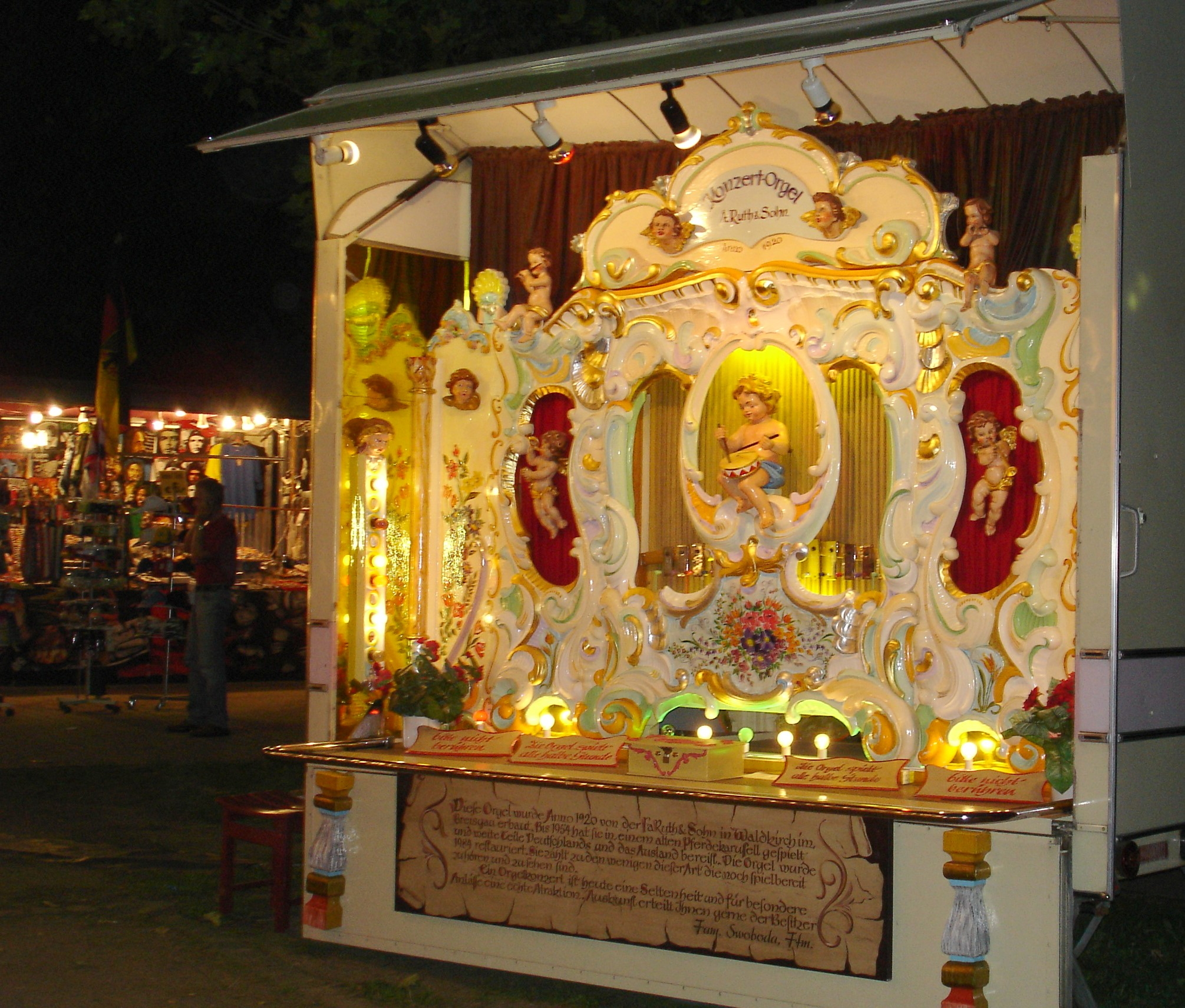
Fairground organ

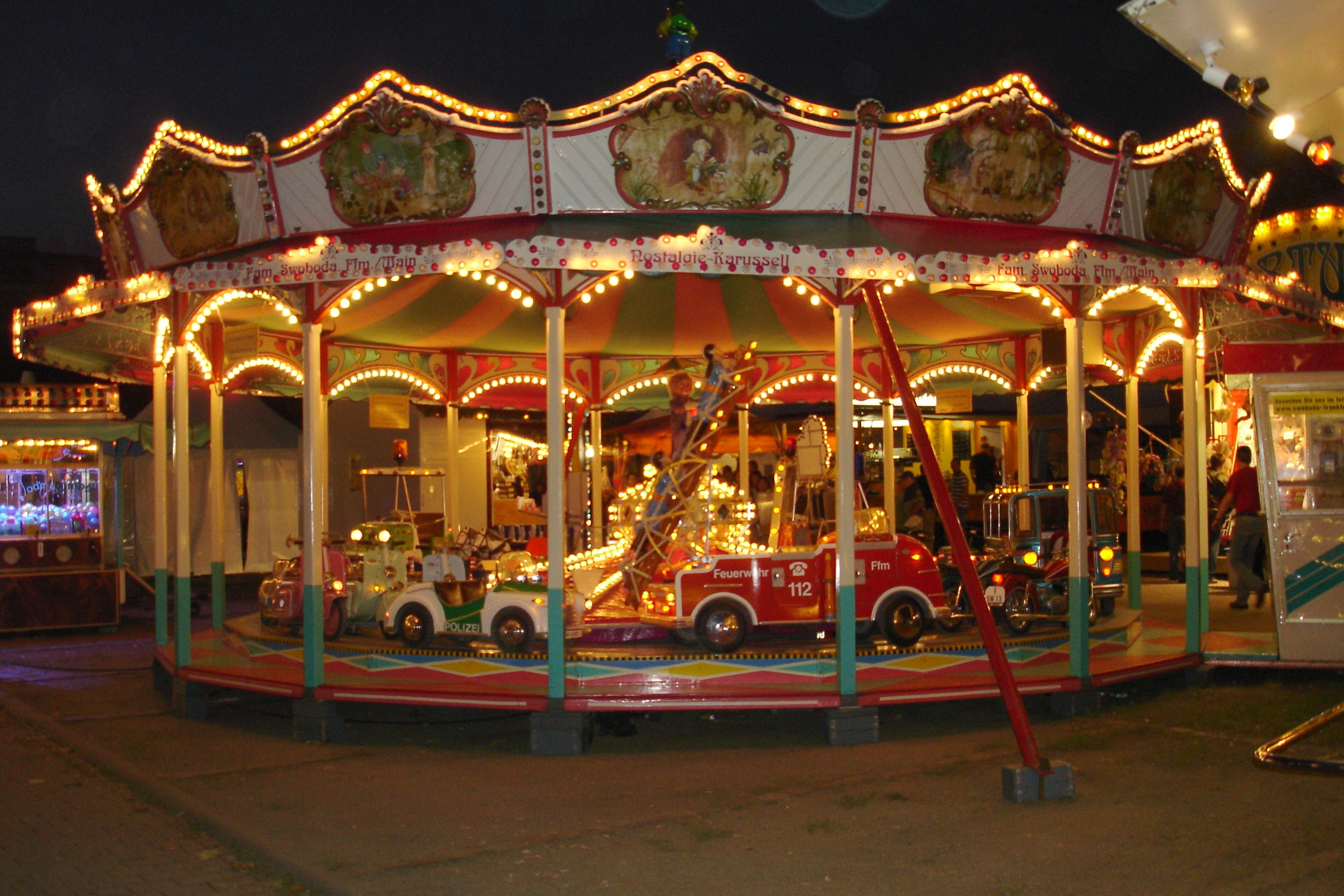
Carousel

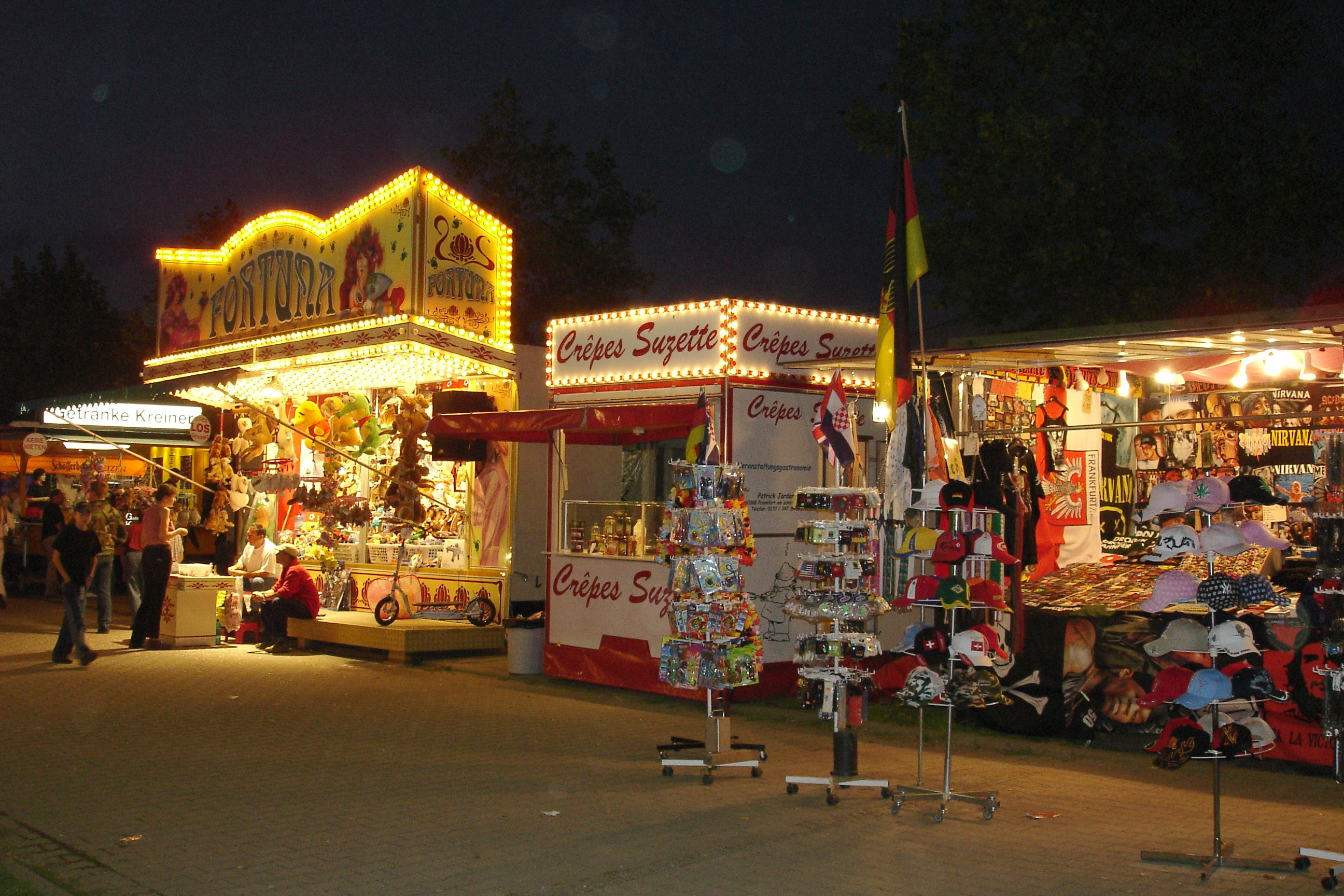
Lottery

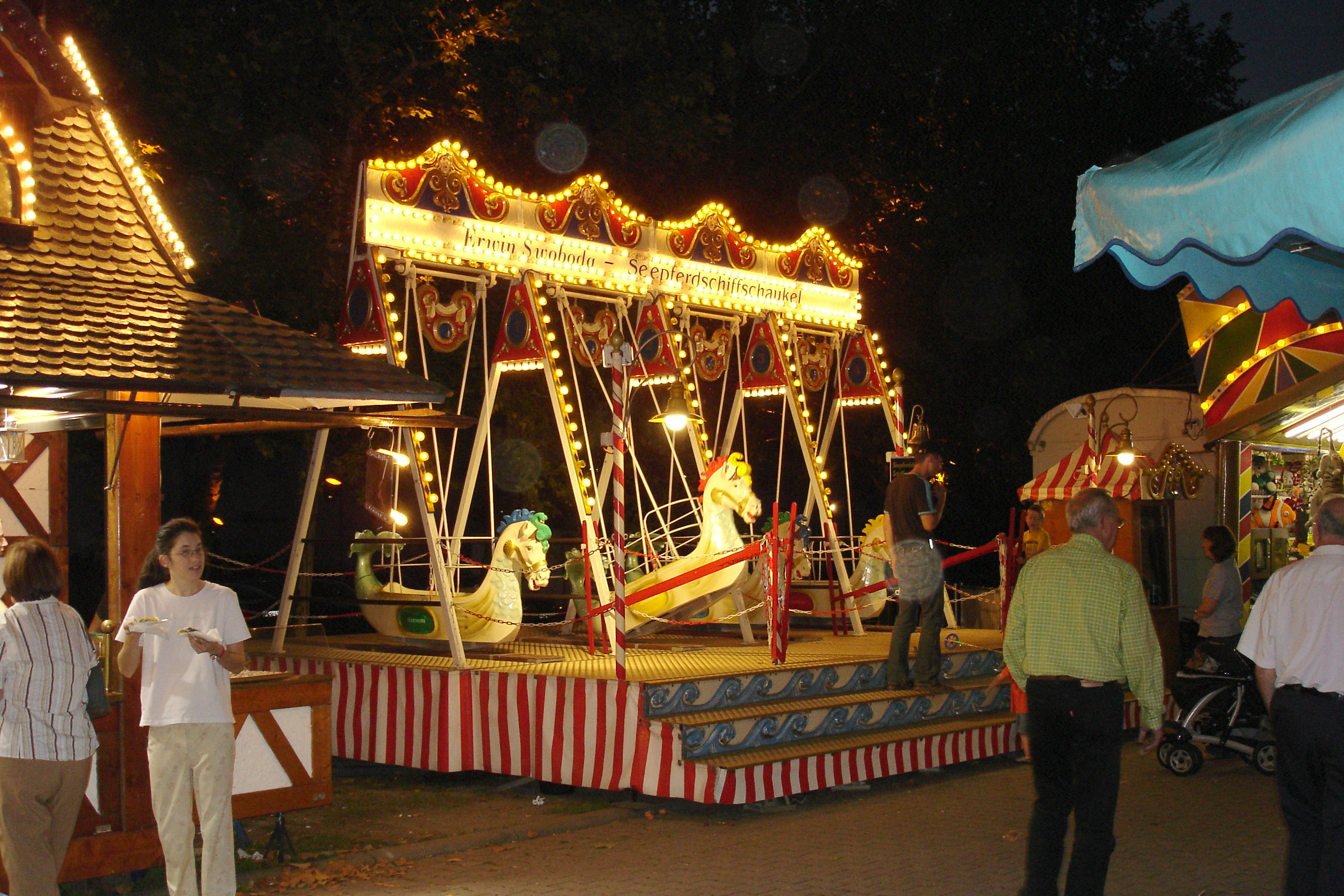
Swing boat

== Education ==
Bergen-Enkheim has two primary schools (Schule am Hang and Schule am Landgraben) and a secondary school, as well as a music school.
