= Battle of Bergen (1759) =

1759 battle in the Seven Years' War

Coordinates: 50°09′18″N 8°45′11″E

- Part of the Seven Years' War
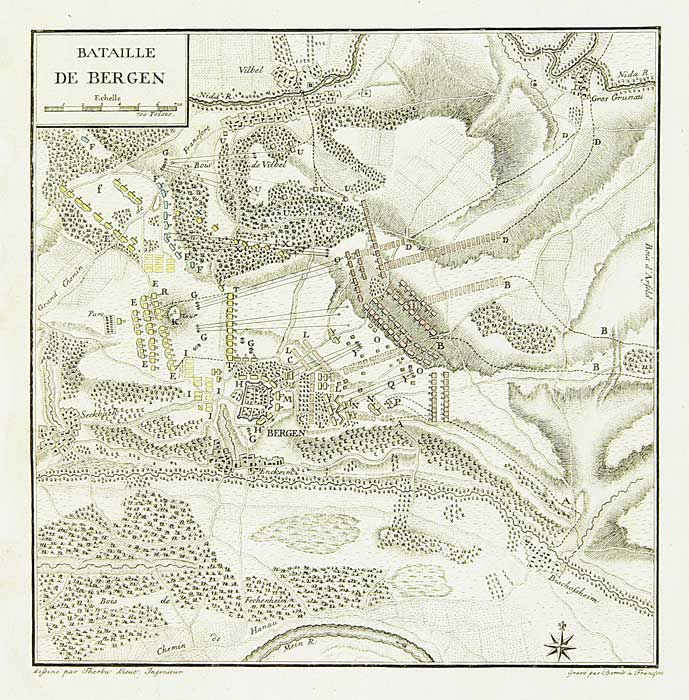
- Battle of Bergen 1759
Date	13 April 1759
Location	Bergen, Hesse
Result	French victory

Belligerents
Great Britain; Hesse-Kassel (or Hesse-Cassel); Brunswick (Province of Hanover) Hanover	France

Commanders and leaders
(Province of Hanover) Duke Ferdinand of Brunswick-Wolfenbüttel	(Kingdom of France) Victor-François, 2nd duc de Broglie

Strength
c. 35,000 men	c. 28,000 men

Casualties and losses
2,500 killed or wounded 300 captured	1,800 killed or wounded

The Battle of Bergen on 13 April 1759 saw the French army under de Broglie withstand an allied British, Hanoverian, Hessian, Brunswick army under Prince Ferdinand of Brunswick near Frankfurt-am-Main during the Seven Years' War.

== Background ==
As the campaigning season of 1759 opened, Prince Ferdinand stole a march on the French by moving out of winter quarters in late March. His destination was Frankfurt, where the French had a base on the Main River. The intent was to drive the French out of Westphalia and seize the initiative for the allies. By the end of the month, his army comprised some 27,000 men grouped into three divisions. One was commanded by Ferdinand himself, one by Prince Johann Casimir of Isenburg-Birstein, and the third by the Duke of Holstein-Gottorp.

Operations commenced with the seizing of Fulda and Meiningen from troops of the Imperial army under Field Marshal von Zweibrücken. As the Imperial army retreated into Bohemia, Ferdinand moved into Hesse hoping to fall upon Broglie's corps before it could be reinforced.

Broglie, however, was able to reinforce his corps with a contingent of Saxons under the General von Dyhern along with other French regiments that he was able to assemble. He placed his small army at the fortified town of Bergen and awaited developments.

== Prelude ==
The battlefield lent itself to a defensive stance. The walled town of Bergen was on the right atop a bluff overlooking the floodplain of the Main River and thus could not be flanked on that side. Northwest of the town was the "Berger-Warte", a low hill that dominated the center and atop of which stood (and still stands) an old tower. Left of that was the town of Vilbel, located on the Nidda River, whose floodplain was covered by an expanse of woods.

Broglie placed a large quantity of infantry in and behind the town of Bergen. On his left, he placed his light infantry in the woods supported by the Saxon contingent as well as some of his cavalry. He placed most of his artillery in the center in eight batteries. Behind the guns he positioned the bulk of his cavalry as well as his reserves. His reserves were formed in "columns of waiting", a type of formation that anticipated Napoleonic tactics and hence was not in common use at this time.

== Battle ==
Ferdinand's army arrived on the field of battle piecemeal. Ferdinand himself accompanied the vanguard, commanded by the Erbprinz. As Ferdinand mistakenly believed that the French had not yet fully deployed, he ordered an immediate attack, choosing not to wait for the other two divisions.

Despite the long odds, by eight o'clock the town of Vilbel had been seized by Wilhelm von Freytag's light infantry and the "Am Hohen Stein," another low hill located east of the "Berger-Warte," had been occupied. Perceiving that Bergen was the key to the position, by 8:30 Ferdinand had ordered an assault on this position. The initial allied attack was successful, driving the French infantry from the hedges and orchards that they occupied and back into the town. Then Broglie began to feed in reinforcements which turned the tide against the allies, driving them back.

At ten o'clock Prince Isenburg's division arrived. Isenburg pitched into the fray, once again driving the French troops back into Bergen. Broglie immediately counterattacked with more fresh regiments that he had fed in from his reserve, disordering the allies and driving them back once more. Isenburg himself was killed while trying to rally his men. It was with difficulty that Ferdinand himself was able to restore order to his troops.

At this point, the battle began to cool off. As Broglie brought his reserve and his cavalry forward, Ferdinand was able to gauge the size of his opponent's army. Furthermore, the French artillery was finding its range and forcing the allied army back up the "Am Hohen Stein." As Holstein-Gottorp's division finally made it onto the field, preparations for another attack were abandoned and the battle turned into an artillery duel that lasted until the fall of night, when the allies withdrew. Although it was a clear French victory, Broglie did not aggressively pursue Ferdinand, who was able to slip away with his army back toward Minden.

== Aftermath ==
This was Ferdinand's darkest moment, and even his brother in law, Frederick the Great commiserated with him to try to boost his morale. Ferdinand would recover, however, and redeem himself and his army later in the same year at the Battle of Minden.

Allied casualties amounted to 2,800. The French lost 1,800 dead or wounded. Among the most notable casualties were the Prince of Isenburg on the allied side and Saxon general George Charles Dyhern on the side of the French and their allies.
