= Ekkehard Kallee =

German nuclear medicine academic

Ekkehard Kallee (born 30 January 1922, Feuerbach - 11 December 2012, Tübingen) was a German university professor and doctor for nuclear medicine.

== Life ==
Ekkehard Kallee attended from 1932 the Eberhard-Ludwigs-Gymnasium in Stuttgart, where he learned Latin and Ancient Greek but comparatively few natural sciences. During World War II he was from 1940 to 1945 a paramedic and subsequently held in custody in a French prisoner-of-war camp in Bad Niedernau for half a year. He studied medicine and graduated in 1950 at the Eberhard Karls University of Tübingen and joined the student fraternity Tübinger Königsgesellschaft Roigel only at a very late stage. He wrote his doctoral thesis from 1947 to 1950 at Carl Martius and Adolf Butenandt about Experiments on the chemical synthesis of an organophosphate of citric acid (Versuche zur Darstellung eines Phosphorsäure-Esters der Citronensäure). The experiments themselves did not have positive results, but Ekkehard Kallee made very interesting observations, with which he could contradict the earlier conclusions of two chemists by acribic efforts.

He married the pedagogue and later social pedagogue Barbara Kallee, née Weigmann, in 1965 and had with her one son, Stephan Kallee. In his spare time he maintained two Suabian meadow orchards in Ammerbuch, and arranged regularly an annual hiking tour with his dental medicine students to these. As a consequence, his brandies and liquors, which were branded with the Latin slogan ex hortis manibusque Kallee (from Kallee's gardens and hands) became well known within the student community.

As a university professor and doctor for nuclear medicine, he was Head of the Radionuclide Laboratory of the University Hospital for Internal Medicine in Tübingen, until he became an emeritus in 1987. He was a Member of the European Thyroid Association, the German Association for Endocrinology and the German Association for Internal Medicine.

== Education, research and public obligation ==
His scientific work – from the time of his doctorate until more than 20 years after becoming an emeritus – was based on the understanding of the reversibility of adsorption processes, as postulated by Irving Langmuir in his sorption isotherm. Ekkehard Kallee was the first to prove the existence of adsorption distribution levels with this.

By understanding the adsorption processes, he succeeded in detecting protein traces by paper electrophoresis of radioactive-iodine-marked insulin. This was, at that time, a breakthrough by several orders of magnitude for the analytical clinical chemistry. Eventually, it was the base for all later immunological detection procedures for various active ingredients.

He published already in 1954 two German articles about the detection method with ^{131}I-marked insulin. By taking autoradiographs of capillary electrophoresis strips he could detect down to 10^{−9} gram ^{131}I-marked insulin. He examined serums of humans, rats and guinea pigs and noted that these varied in their capability, to reduce the specific adsorption of veal insulin in filtration paper. Human serums were better suited for the specific insulin detection method than rat or guinea pig serums at the time, because they showed the characteristic ^{131}I-marked insulin bands only, when non-radioactive carrier-insulin was added. In this field of research one half of the Nobel Prize in Physiology or Medicine was given to Rosalyn Sussman Yalow in 1977 for the development of radioimmunological methods for the detection of peptide hormones. She collaborated over 22 years in a scientific partnership with Solomon Aaron Berson, who would have shared the Nobel Prize with her and Ekkeard Kallee, if he had survived until the prize giving ceremony.

Ekkehard Kallee determined from 1952 to 1959 the principles of the reversibility of protein adsorption together with his colleagues G. Seybold, J. Wollensak, W. Oppermann and H. Ott by conducting experiments on die adsorption of serum proteins. The research team's idea about the passive transport of protein-bound substances was triggered by the medical examination of patients with disorders caused by a lack of albumin.

One of Ekkehard Kallee's key research topics was the analbuminaemia, a rarely occurring genetic disorder, of which only 50 cases have been published worldwide. Ekkehard Kallee examined two Suebian siblings with analbuminaemia over a period of 38 years. These are globally the first two patients, for whom this illness has been diagnosed and published. The female analbuminaemia patient was treated with a substitution therapy mit human serum albumin. Laboratory analysis before and after the infusion of large amounts of albumin gave a hint about a mechanism, by which albumin-bound substances were transported passively in the blood within the circulatory system into the extracellular fluid volume and the other way round. She developed in the fourth decade of her life an extreme lipodystrophy. She had a juvenile osteoporosis, which could be normalised by the albumin substitution. She died at the age of 69 years from cancer. Her brother didn't ever get any albumin, although his serum contained only 60 μg/mL of an albumin-like protein. He suffered from an extreme osteoporosis and died at the age of 59 years from colorectal cancer. Although both patients had high cholesterol values and a high number of blood clotting factors, they did not have any disadvantages by that.

Generally, most of Ekkehard Kallee's research projects were based on the interaction with patients. This is particularly relevant for the diagnosis and therapy of thyroid illnesses as one of the first doctors of nuclear medicine in Germany. Long before the Chernobyl disaster he assessed the risks and benefits of iodine prophylaxis at nuclear power plant disasters. After the disaster, he examined food from the regions affected by the nuclear fallout and developed a method of decontaminating radioactively contaminated meat – especially reindeer and deer meat – by curing.

== Family ==
Ekkehard Kallee was from an academic family in Württemberg: His father Albert Kallee was director of the Landgericht Stuttgart and expert for employment law. His grandfather Richard Kallee was Lutheran parish priest in Feuerbach and as a local historian discovered 102 alamannic sandstone cists in Feuerbach and documented 760 archaeological finds. The Kalleestraße in Stuttgart-Feuerbach is named after him. His great-grandfather, General Eduard von Kallee was probably an illegitimate son of King William I of Württemberg and devoted himself after an unusually steep military and diplomatic career to literary, artistic and archaeological studies, during which discovered several Roman sites along the Limes Germanicus.

== Publications ==
- Zur Natur der Azorubin-Bindung an Serumalbumin, Hoppe-Seyler's Zeitschrift für Physiologische Chemie 290, 1952, pages 207-215.
- with Hans Hermann Bennhold: Comparative studies on the half-life of ^{131}I-labeled alubumins and nonradioactive human serum albumin in a case of analbuminemia. Journal of Clinic Investigation 1959, Bennhold, H; Kallee, E (1959). "Comparative studies on the half-life of I 131-labeled albumins and nonradioactive human serum albumin in a case of analbuminemia". J Clin Invest. 38 (5): 863–72. doi:10.1172/JCI103868. PMC 293232. PMID 13654522.
- Die reversible Bindung von Schilddrüsenhormonen und anionischen Farbstoffen an Proteine und ihre Bedeutung für Permeabilitätsvorgänge an den Zellgrenzen, Tübingen, Medical Faculty, Habilitation Thesis of 16 June 1961.
- with F. Lohss: Spurennachweis von Albumin durch Analyse von Antigen-Antikörperpraezipitaten., Clinica Chimica Acta 4, 1959, pages 127-133.
- with Uta Eistert and Richard Wahl: Inhibitory and Disruptive Effects of Some Antirheumatics on Antigen-Antibody Complexes. (PDF-Datei; 914 kB) Clinical Chemistry and Laboratory Medicine 33, 2009, pages 711-714.
