= Eberhard-Ludwigs-Gymnasium =

Location
- Herdweg 72; Baden-Württemberg; Stuttgart, 70174; Germany
- Coordinates: 48°47′14″N 9°9′41″E

Information
- School type: Gymnasium
- Established: 1686; 340 years ago
- Studiendirektor: Mario Zecher
- Teaching staff: 49
- Gender: Coeducational
- Enrollment: c. 500 (February 2017)
- Website: www.ebelu.de

Eberhard-Ludwigs-Gymnasium is a gymnasium in Stuttgart established in 1686. The gymnasium is the oldest in the city, from which many of the others emerged over the years. It is often referred to as ‘Ebelu’, made up of the first few letters of the namesakes names.

Ebelu is a humanist and musical gymnasium, with students choosing between a musical and a linguistic specialisation. Students regularly participate in a range of musical performances, mostly of classical music, and the school regularly organises or hosts social and cultural events. The school has multiple well-known graduates, including Fritz Bauer, Loriot and Claus von Stauffenberg.

The building is currently undergoing significant renovations, during which the students have moved to alternative locations.

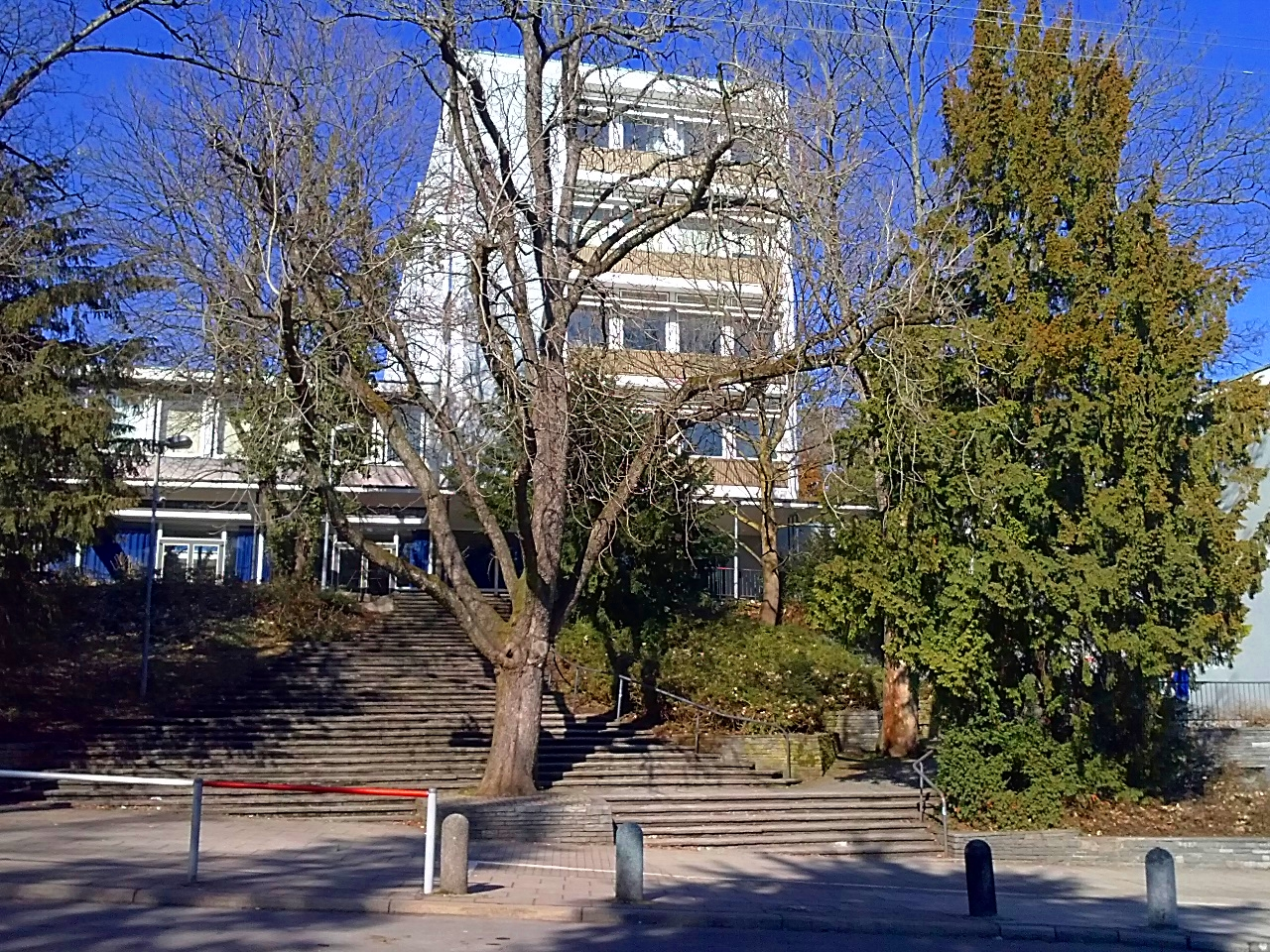
Eberhard-Ludwigs-Gymnasium in 2013

== History ==
=== Early history and predecessors ===
Originally a Latin School since the 14th century, it was later moved to a different area of the city. After a while, legal changes regarding schooling and the further development and popularisation of Humanism led to an extension into a 6-year “Pädagogium”, a change from a city to a state school and to the extension of the authority of the principal of this new ‘model school’ over the Latin schools in the state. The school was established in 1686 as Gymnasium Illustre (zu Stuttgart). Among the reasons for its creations were concerns about a lower standard of learning after the Thirty Years' War, but also a desire to create a school in Stuttgart which qualified its graduates to enter universities that could compete with the city and religious schools.

=== 18th and 19th Century ===
During the 18th and 19th centuries, the fast growth and new organisation of the schools led to a desire for more space, which culminated in renovations and new construction between 1838 and 1840. A Realschule was added in 1794, simultaneously with an extension of the number of grades to 9. This school later became the Friedrich-Eugens-Gymnasium. A realist gymnasium was added in 1867, which became independent in 1871 and later turned into the Dillmann-Gymnasium. In 1881, during the reign of Charles I of Württemberg, because of overcrowding, the Karls-Gymnasium was established and took over 18 of its 39 classes. At this time, it changed its name to the current one after Eberhard Louis, Duke of Württemberg, who had been under age and under guardianship at the time of the school's foundation.

=== 20th Century ===
During the Second World War, the building was partially evacuated, moving some lessons to schools outside of the city center. The building of the ‘Ebelu’ was destroyed in 1944 by an allied bombing and only rebuild in 1957. Until they moved into the new building, the students were mostly fought in classrooms belonging to other schools. During and after the Protests of 1968, there was significant conflict between the teachers and student body, even leading to vandalism, such as the destruction of school property in 1972. Causes included perceived mistreatment of students by teachers, but also a desire for general liberalisation. Haussmann, the principal at the time, was generally strict, but also protective of the students and specifically the student newspaper, despite it printing controversial editions including on human sexuality and an interview with Rudi Dutschke, am member of the 1968 student movement.

=== 21st Century ===
Due to the creation of the pilot-project musical specialisation in 2013, the lack of space necessitates a renovation of the building, expected to extend the available space from 3,100 to 4,500 square meters. The additional space should house a new wing for the science class rooms, a space for events and concert, a new gym and an extended cafeteria. Additionally, the outside spaces are renovated as well. As of 2020, the project is expected to cost 67 million Euro.

In 2015, a temporary building was created around 200 Meters from the school, intended to house the upperclassmen during the renovation. While it was originally expected that students remain in parts of the building during the renovation, the plan was later altered. Around 500 students were temporarily moved to a building originally belonging to the Hedwig-Dohm-Schule at Ludwigstraße 111. The temporary transfer happened in 2019 and was generally successful, despite some minor issues.

== Specialisations ==
=== Humanist specialisation ===
Most students are part of the general humanist Specialisation. In addition to generally mandated subject such as English, students are obligated to learn Latin from the 5th until the 10th grade. Starting from 8th grade, students are obligated to either choose a third language (French or Old Greek) or instead study Music as a main subject (separately from those with a full musical specialisation).

=== Musical specialisation ===
Since 2013, “Ebelu” has a separate music class for highly gifted students in addition to the language and regular music classes. This offers students who have musical talent lessons in cooperation with a local college im music-related subjects but meanwhile ensure that they can acquire the general university entrance qualification. To be admitted, a special exam must be taken.

== Building ==
The first building in what is today, Gymnasiumstraße in Stuttgart, was built in 1686 and converted in 1840. A new building erected in 1903 in Holzgartenstraße was destroyed in 1944 during a nocturnal bomb attack on Stuttgart. The school was then accommodated in the buildings of the Zeppelin-Gymnasium until the new buildings on the site of the former villa of Ferdinand von Zeppelin at Herdweg 72 had been completed in 1957. The new building was developed by a team led by the architect Hans Bregler, a former pupil who had completed his abitur in 1941. This building became heritage protected because of its prize-winning architecture (Paul Bonatz Prize 1959). The renovation of the building began in 2019, which included the extension of the building and the modernisation of musical and scientific structure.

== Student life and activities ==
The school has a long-standing cooperation with the St. Francis School in Mumbai, which includes two-week exchanges. There are regular events about political, artistic or historical topics, usually organised by or about current and former students and parents.

Since 2018, the Fritz-Bauer-Price, which is named after the former student Fritz Bauer, is given to students for outstanding social engagement. Fritz Bauer was a Jewish judge and prosecutor who assisted with in the capture of Adolf Eichmann and took part in the Frankfurt Auschwitz trials.

Musical events, often done by students from the musical specialisation, are organised regularly.

Since 1951, in addition to state funding, some events and some students from disadvantaged socioeconomic backgrounds are receive money from the Ebelu-Verein e.V., a charitable organisation whose funders are mostly made up by former students and family members of current and former students.

== Notable alumni ==
=== Authors, writers and poets ===
- Berthold Auerbach, a 19th-century poet and author
- Johann Friedrich Cotta, who was a publisher, politician and business
- Georg Herwegh, a 19th-century poet
- Eduard Mörike, a lutheran pastor, writer and poet
- Gustav Schwab, who was a pastor and writer
- Fred Uhlmann, a lawyer, writer and painter
- Wilhelm Waiblinger, a romantic poet mostly known for his text on Hölderlin
- Karl Mayer (poet), a lawyer and poet
- Wilhelm Hertz, a Poet and Germanist most of whose work have been lost
- Bruno Frank, a humanist writer and poet
- Klaus Mehnert, a journalist, writer and academic
- Curt Meyer-Clason, a writer and well-known translator

=== Individuals with political involvement ===
- Christoph Blumhardt, a theologian and social-democratic politician
- Eugen Gerstenmaier, a theologian, politician and resistance fighter
- Conrad Haußmann, a lawyer and politician
- Otto Hirsch, a Jewish jurist and politician killed by the Nazis
- Konstantin Freiherr von Neurath, a Nazi war criminal imprisoned for his crime
- Joseph von Linden, a 19th-century lawyer and politician
- Anton Pfeifer, a politician and member of the Bundestag
- Thomas Sattelberger, a manager and politician
- Rolf Schlierer, a right-wing contemporary politician, lawyer and doctor

=== Resistance members and other opponents of the Nazi regime ===
- Fritz Bauer, a Jewish judge and prosecutor who assisted with in the capture of Adolf Eichmann
- Kurt Huber, a resistance fighter with White Rose
- Rüdiger Schleicher, a legal scholar on international law and resistance fighter
- Claus Graf Schenk von Stauffenberg, a senior army officer and resistance fighter who was executed by the Nazi regime
- Berthold Schenk Graf von Stauffenberg, who was an aristocrat, lawyer and resistance fighter who was executed by the Nazi regime

=== Theologians and religious figures ===
- Johann Christoph Blumhardt, a theologian
- Eduard Emil Koch, a hymnologist and pastor
- Karl Gerok, a preacher and poet
- Richard Wilhelm, a sinologist, missionary and well-known translator

=== Arts, Media and Culture ===
- Vicco von Bülow alias Loriot, a well-known comedian, director and actor
- Peter Lohmeyer, a contemporary actor
- Gottlob Friedrich Steinkopf, a landscape painter
- Wilhelm Ganzhorn, a judge and lyricist
- Otto Reiniger, a impressionist
- Johannes Klumpp, a conductor

=== Scientists, Researchers and Philosophers ===
- Julius Euting, a librarian and Orientalist
- Georg Wilhelm Friedrich Hegel, a philosopher and influential figures of German idealism and 19th-century philosophy.
- Werner Krauss, a professor of Romanticism and resistance fighter
- Karl Schefold, an archaeologist with a speciality in the religious content of ancient art
- Hans Spemann, an embryologist who ‘stole’ his female students research and received a Nobel Prize for it
- Wilhelm Zimmermann, a theologian and historian described as the “founding father of German vegetarianism“
- Robert von Mohl, a legal scholar and professor of administrative law and politician
- Hermann von Nördlinger, a botanist and entomologist
- Wilhelm Siegmund Teuffel, a scholar and professor of Classics
- Julius August Christoph Zech, a mathematician and astronomer
- Viktor von Weizsäcker, a medical doctor, researcher and professor
- Paul Schlack, a chemist and inventor of Nylon 6
- Ludwig Raiser, a legal scholar
- Ekkehard Kallee, who was a researcher and medical doctor
- Karl Dietrich Bracher, a German political scientist and historian
- Alexander Schenk Graf von Stauffenberg, a historian and brother of Berthold Schenk Graf von Stauffenberg and Claus Graf Schenk von Stauffenberg

=== People with significance in their respective fields ===
- Reinhard Heinrich Ferdinand Fischer, an architect
- Johann Heinrich Ferdinand von Autenrieth, who was a German physician
- Carl Benjamin Klunzinger, a physician and zoologist
- Gustav Adolf Kröner, a publicist and political activist
- Robert Zahn, an industrialist and engineer
- Hans Klumbach, an archaeologist
- Oliver Günther, a computer scientist and university professor
