= Böbingen (Rems) station =

Railway station in the municipality of Böbingen an der Rems,

Böbingen (Rems)
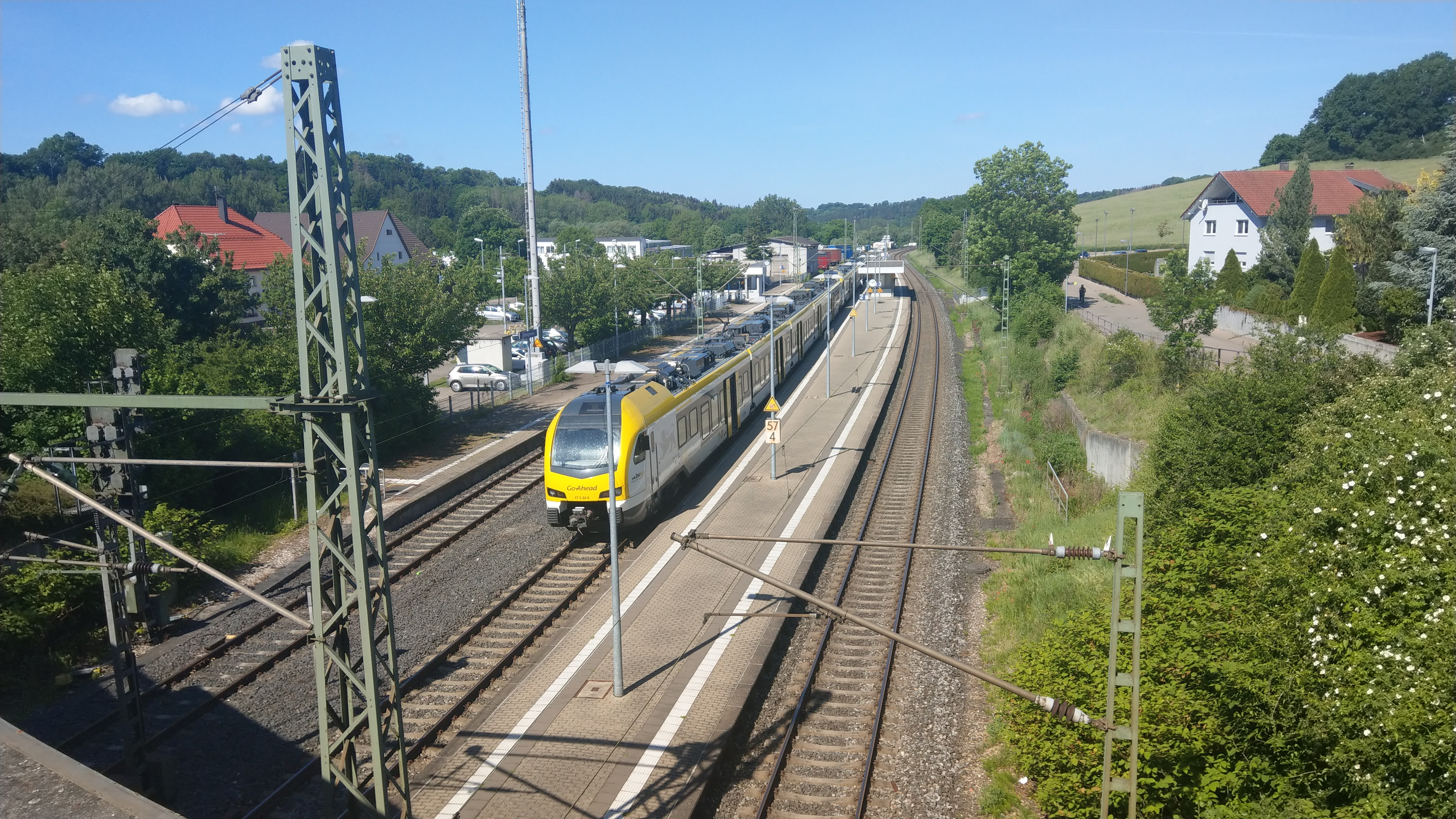

General information
- Location: Bahnhofstraße 26; 73560 Böbingen an der Rems; Baden-Württemberg; Germany
- Coordinates: 48°49′20″N 09°54′46″E
- Elevation: 381 m (1,250 ft)
- System: Bf
- Owner: DB Netz
- Operator: DB Station&Service
- Lines: Stuttgart-Bad Cannstatt–Nördlingen railway (KBS 786)
- Platforms: 1 side platform 1 island platform
- Tracks: 3
- Train operators: Go-Ahead Baden-Württemberg
- Connections: Bus interchange

Construction
- Parking: yes
- Cycle facilities: yes
- Accessible: yes

Other information
- Station code: 718
- DS100 code: TBB
- IBNR: 8005979
- Category: 5
- Fare zone: OAM: 2395
- Website: www.bahnhof.de

Services
| Preceding station | | Following station |
|---|---|---|
| Schwäbisch Gmünd towards Stuttgart Hbf | MEX 13 | Mögglingen (Gmünd) towards Crailsheim |
Location
- Location within Baden-Württemberg Location within Germany Location within Europe

Böbingen (Rems) station is a railway station in the municipality of Böbingen an der Rems, located in the Ostalbkreis district in Baden-Württemberg, Germany. The station lies on the Stuttgart-Bad Cannstatt–Nördlingen railway. The train services are operated by Go-Ahead Baden-Württemberg.
