= Berger Rücken =

Geological formation of Germany

The Berger Rücken (Bergen Ridge) is a geological formation that extends along the northeast edge of Frankfurt am Main. Parts of the Bergen Ridge belong to the Frankfurt Green Belt and its Natural Springs Hiking Trail. The southern side of the Bergen Ridge, once covered with vineyards, is now home to one of Frankfurt's premier residential districts, Berger Hang.

The Bergen Ridge originated during the last ice age, when the river Main formed today's ridge as a river bank. Remaining from this time are the Enkheim and Seckbach lakes and marshes. Excavations on the Bergen Ridge have also uncovered ancient settlements, a Roman sanctuary, a Roman estate, Roman roads, a large Jupiter column, and fossils of a prehistoric hippopotamus-like animal.

The Lohrberg is home to the last existing vineyard in Frankfurt's city limits. The Lohrberger Hang Riesling grows on the 1.3-hectare vineyard, which is the smallest and easternmost area of the Rhine Valley wine-growing region.

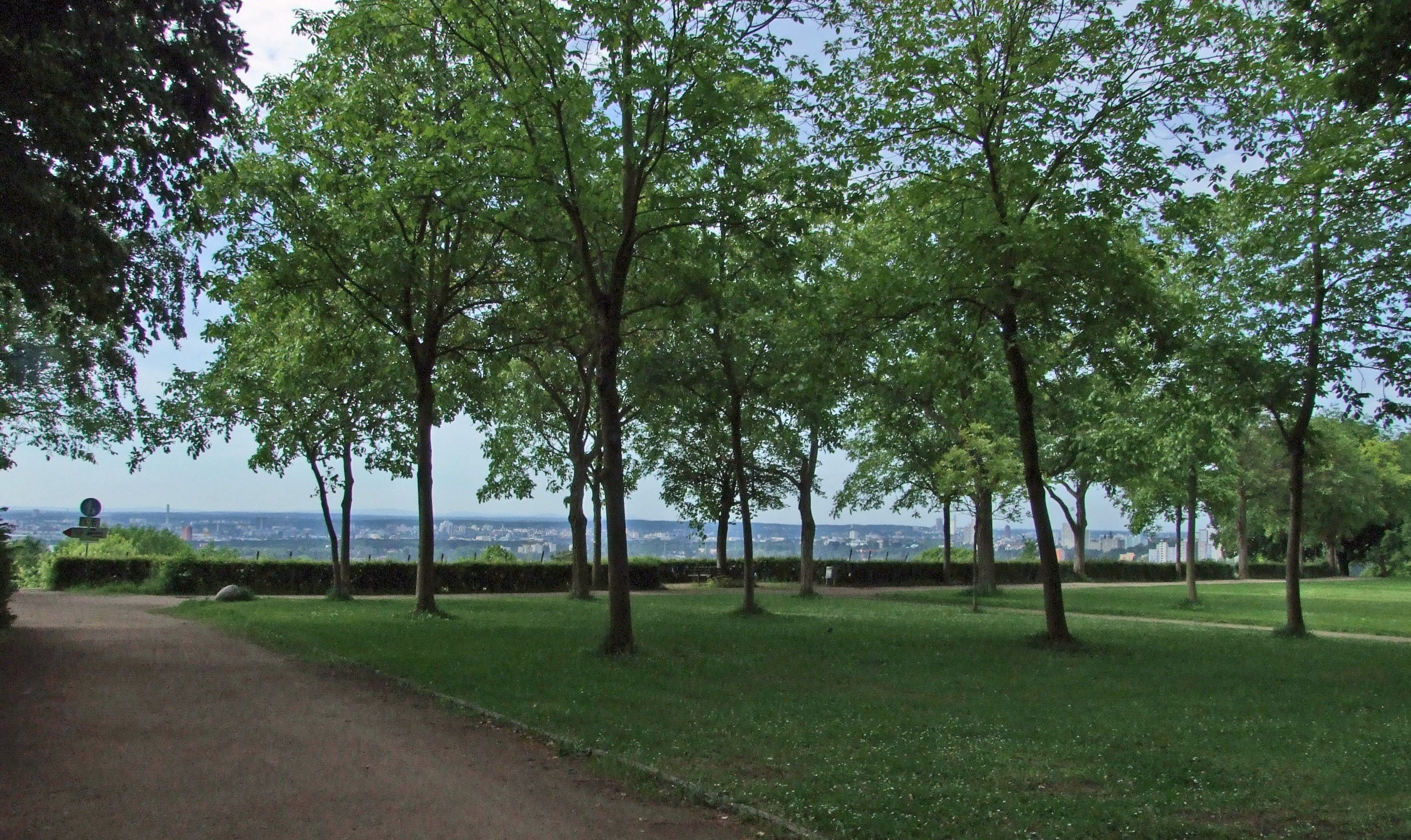
Panoramic view of the Lohrpark, on the Lohrberg
