= Hans Klumbach =

- Born: 26 April 1904; Wolfach, Ortenaukreis, Germany
- Died: 14 December 1992 (aged 88)
- Education: Ph.D., University of Tübingen and Heidelberg University
- Known for: Expert on Roman helmets
- Scientific career
- Institutions: Romano-Germanic Central Museum
- Doctoral advisor: Carl Watzinger

Hans Klumbach (26 April 1904 – 14 December 1992) was a German archaeologist and scholar of classical and provincial Roman studies. He served as a curator at, and later the director of, the Romano-Germanic Central Museum. His 1973 work Spätrömische Gardehelme laid bare the relationship between the late Roman ridge helmets and the later Scandinavian and Anglo-Saxon crested helmets.

== Early life and education ==
Hans Klumbach was born on 26 April 1904 in Wolfach, in the German district of Ortenaukreis. He grew up in Stuttgart, where he attended the Eberhard-Ludwigs-Gymnasium. From 1922 until 1927, when he obtained a Ph.D. under the supervision of Carl Watzinger, Klumbach studied at the University of Tübingen and Heidelberg University. After leaving school Klumbach embarked on a travel scholarship awarded by the German Archaeological Institute, after which he worked as a scientific assistant for the institute in Rome and Athens. Klumbach served in the military from 1940 to 1947 including during World War II, for part of which time he was imprisoned.

== Career ==
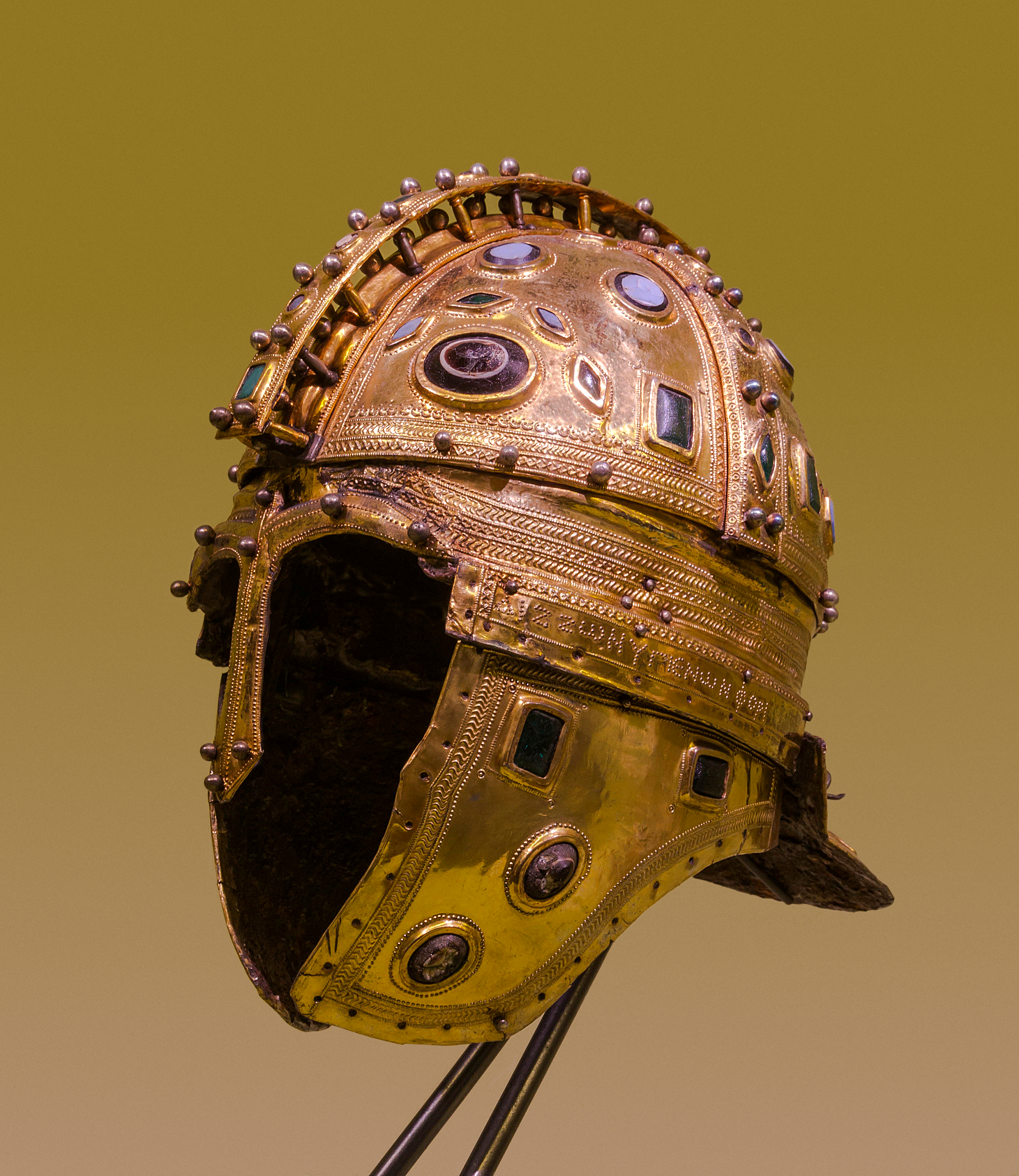
The Berkasovo I helmet, one of the late Roman ridge helmets surveyed by Klumbach

In 1950 Klumbach became a curator at the Romano-Germanic Central Museum in Mainz, and in 1954 he became its director; in 1952 he was also made an honorary professor for Roman-Germanic Archaeology at the Johannes Gutenberg University Mainz.

Klumbach was considered an expert on Roman helmets. In 1957 he published the fragments of one such helmet discovered in Faurndau and supervised their conservation, and subsequently he did the same for helmets unearthed in Bad Cannstatt, Welzheim, and Aalen. Spätrömische Gardehelme, his resulting 1973 work, surveyed the newly restored group of late Roman ridge helmets from the fourth and fifth century AD, fitting them into a typology between the helmets of the early Roman Empire and the early medieval Spangenhelme.

== Bibliography ==
- Bruce-Mitford, Rupert (1978). The Sutton Hoo Ship-Burial, Volume 2: Arms, Armour and Regalia. London: British Museum Publications. ISBN 978-0-7141-1331-9.
- Hans Klumbach zum sechzigsten Geburtstag am 26. April 1964. In: Jahrbuch des Römisch-Germanischen Zentralmuseums 10, 1963, pp. V–XI.
- Jan Filip: Enzyklopädisches Handbuch zur Ur- und Frühgeschichte Europas. Verlag der Tschechoslowakischen Akademie, Prag 1966, vol. 1, pp. 609–610.
- Johnson, Stephen (1980). "A Late Roman Helmet from Burgh Castle". Britannia. XI. Society for the Promotion of Roman Studies: 303–312. JSTOR 525684.
- Filtzinger, Philipp (1993). "Hans Klumbach: 1904–1992". Fundberichte aus Baden-Württemberg. 18. E. Schweizerbart'sche Verlagsbuchhandlung: 633–634.
