= Equites stablesiani =

The equites stablesiani were a class of cavalry in the Late Roman army. They were one of several categories of cavalry unit or vexillatio created between the 260s and 290s as part of a reorganization and expansion of Roman cavalry forces initiated during the reign of Gallienus (r. 260–268 AD). These new cavalry vexillationes typically shared the basic regimental designation equites, and included equites Dalmatae, equites Mauri and equites scutarii.

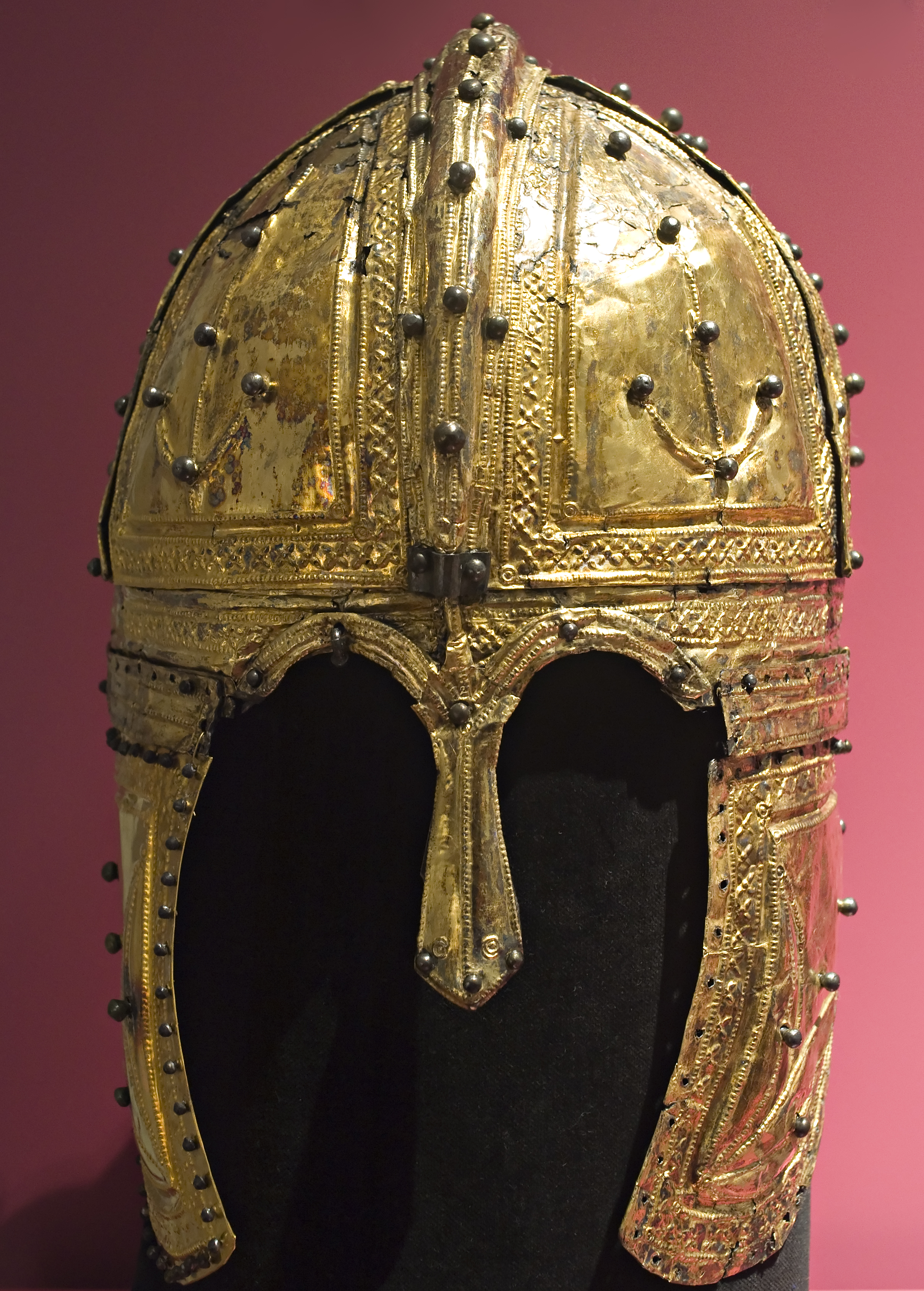
Late Roman ridge helmet, called the Deurne helmet. It is covered in silver-gilt sheathing and is inscribed to a cavalryman of the Equites Stablesiani.

In total there is evidence for around 20 units of equites stablesiani between the late third and early sixth centuries. The Notitia Dignitatum (400–c.425) lists at least 15 units of equites stablesiani stationed throughout the Roman Empire, seven in the East, eight in the West. Two further units are recorded epigraphically at an earlier date, including an inscription on the Deurne helmet. At least another two units, although not directly documented, can be posited on the basis of attested regimental names and numbers.

The origin of the equites stablesiani and the meaning of their name remain obscure. Hoffmann suggests that these units were raised from a corps of grooms, which, he hypothesises, were originally attached to new cavalry vexillationes created under Gallienus. Along similar lines, Speidel first argued that equites stablesiani were formed from stratores, soldiers (from both legions and auxilia) who had previously been seconded to the staff of provincial governors as grooms, equerries and/or bodyguards. More recently, Speidel, rejecting this earlier thesis, supposes that the designation equites stablesiani originally applied to those cavalry units which were temporarily stationed in north-western Italy during the reign of Gallienus under the command of Aureolus, whom Speidel identifies as stabulensis, a senior officer in charge of the imperial stables.

While the origin of their regimental titulature is disputed, the equites stablesiani appear to have formed part of the emperor's comitatus (field army accompanying the emperor) during the military crisis of the 260s and 270s. Later, probably during the Tetrarchy and/or the reign of Constantine I, most units of this class were permanently assigned to the garrisons of frontier provinces. The continued existence of some of these regiments of equites stablesiani is attested well into the sixth century.

== Bibliography ==
- D. Hoffmann (1969–70). "Das spätrömische Bewegungsheer und die Notitia Dignitatum". Epigraphische Studien 7.1-2. Düsseldorf.
- P. Rance (2012). "The Third Equites Stablesiani at Cyrrhus". Academia. pp. 345–358.
- H.-G. Simon (1980). "Die Reformen der Reiterei unter Kaiser Gallien". Cologne/Vienna. W. Eck et al. pp. 435–452.
- M. P. Speidel (1974). "Stablesiani: the raising of new cavalry units during the crisis of the Roman Empire". Chiron. pp. 541–546. (reprinted in M.P. Speidel, Roman Army Studies 1 [Amsterdam 1984] 391-396)
- M. P. Speidel (2008). "I". Das Heer. Berlin: K.-P. Johne. pp. 673–690.
- M. P. Speidel (1984). "Roman Army Studies". Amsterdam: J. C. Gieben.
