= Eduard Emil Koch =

German pastor and hymnologist

Eduard Emil Koch (30 January 1809 – 27 April 1871) was a German pastor and hymnologist.

== Life ==
Koch was born at Solitude Palace, the son of the staff doctor Friedrich Koch and his wife Margarethe Koch, née Sigrist. He completed the Eberhard-Ludwigs-Gymnasium and then the seminary in Urach in Stuttgart, before he went to Tübingen from 1826 to 1830 where he studied theology. During that period, he became a member of the Burschenschaft Germania Tübingen in 1826. He was regarded as one of the most active and quickest members of his fraternity and was therefore imprisoned several times at Schloss Hohentübingen.

In 1830, he became vicar in Ehningen, in 1837 pastor in Großaspach, where he married Marie Auguste Speidel. The couple had two children. He became pastor in Heilbronn in 1847, promoted further from third pastor to head pastor and dean. His career took a turn when he tried to prevent the performance of Haydn's oratorio The Creation in a church of the Heilbronn deanery. Although the parish council followed his view that such an event was not suitable for a church, the consistory overturned the decision. In protest, Koch applied to be moved to the parish of the village Erdmannhausen. He died of smallpox on a trip to Stuttgart at the age of 62, where he wanted to obtain his complete removal from office. His tomb in the Hoppenlaufriedhof has been preserved.

In 1847, Koch published the Geschichte des Kirchenlieds und Kirchengesangs, a history of singing hymns in church, of which several new editions were later published.

== Publications ==
- Geschichte des Kirchenlieds und Kirchengesangs.
  - 1st Edition, Mit besonderer Rücksicht auf Würtemberg:
    - Part 1: Die Dichter und Sänger. Druck und Verlag der Chr. Belser'schen Buchhandlung, Stuttgart 1847 (Digital link by the Bayerische Staatsbibliothek).
    - Part 2: Die Lieder und Weisen. Belser, Stuttgart 1847 (Digital link).
  - 2nd Edition:
    - First main part: Die Dichter und Sänger. Vol. 1. Belser, Stuttgart 1852 (Digital link).
    - First main part: Die Dichter und Sänger. Vol. 2. Belser, Stuttgart 1852 (Digital link).
    - First main part: Die Dichter und Sänger. Vol. 3. Belser, Stuttgart 1853 (Digital link).
    - Second main part: Die Lieder und Weisen. Vol. 4. Belser, Stuttgart 1853 (Digital link).
  - 3rd Edition:
    - First main part: Die Dichter und Sänger. Vol. 1. Belser, Stuttgart 1866 (Digital link).
    - First main part: Die Dichter und Sänger. Vol. 2. Belser, Stuttgart 1867 (Digital link).
    - First main part: Die Dichter und Sänger. Vol. 3. Belser, Stuttgart 1867 (Digital link).
    - First main part: Die Dichter und Sänger. Vol. 4. Belser, Stuttgart 1868 (Digital link).
    - First main part: Die Dichter und Sänger. Vol. 5. Belser, Stuttgart 1868 (Digital link).
    - First main part: Die Dichter und Sänger. Vol. 6. Belser, Stuttgart 1869 (Digital link).
    - First main part: Die Dichter und Sänger. Vol. 7. Edited by Adolf Wilhelm Koch after the death of the author. Belser, Stuttgart 1872 (Digital link).
    - Second main part: Die Lieder und Weisen. Vol. 8. Newly edited by Richard Lauxmann. Belser, Stuttgart 1876 (Digital link).
