= Mögglingen (Gmünd) station =

Railway station in the municipality of Mögglingen,

Mögglingen (Gmünd)
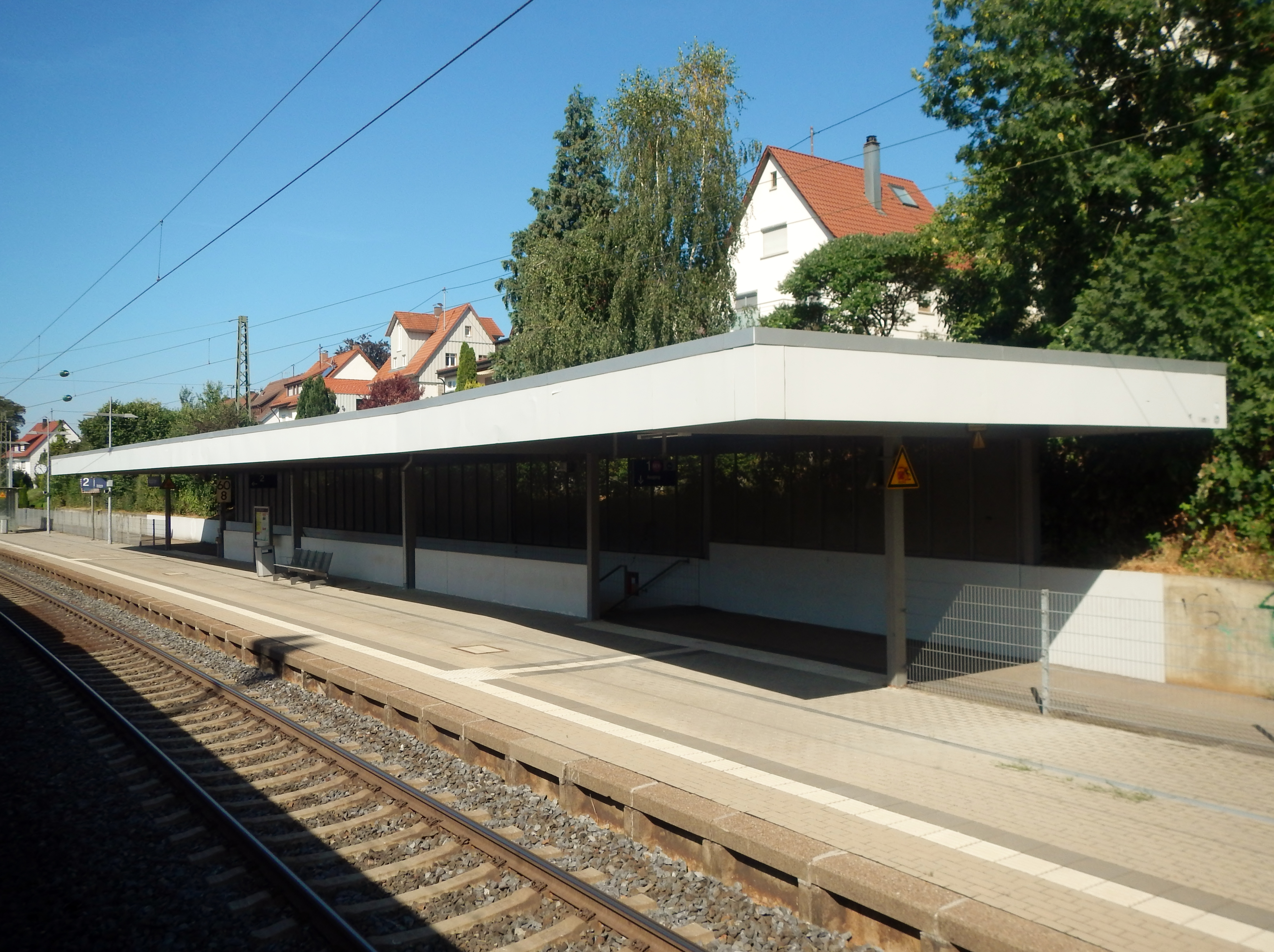

General information
- Location: Bahnhofstraße 3; 73563 Mögglingen; Baden-Württemberg; Germany
- Coordinates: 48°49′30″N 09°57′32″E
- Elevation: 413 m (1,355 ft)
- System: Hp
- Owner: DB Netz
- Operator: DB Station&Service
- Lines: Rems Railway (KBS 786)
- Platforms: 2 side platforms
- Tracks: 2
- Train operators: Go-Ahead Baden-Württemberg
- Connections: Bus interchange

Construction
- Parking: yes
- Cycle facilities: yes
- Accessible: yes

Other information
- Station code: 4150
- DS100 code: TMOE
- IBNR: 8004053
- Category: 6
- Fare zone: OAM: 2398
- Website: www.bahnhof.de

Services
Preceding station		Following station
Böbingen (Rems) towards Stuttgart Hbf	MEX 13	Aalen Hbf towards Crailsheim
Location
- Location within Baden-Württemberg Location within Germany Location within Europe

Mögglingen (Gmünd) station is a railway stop in the municipality of Mögglingen, located in the Ostalbkreis district in Baden-Württemberg, Germany. The station lies on the Rems Railway. The train services are operated by Go-Ahead Baden-Württemberg.
