= Sylvia Wetzel =

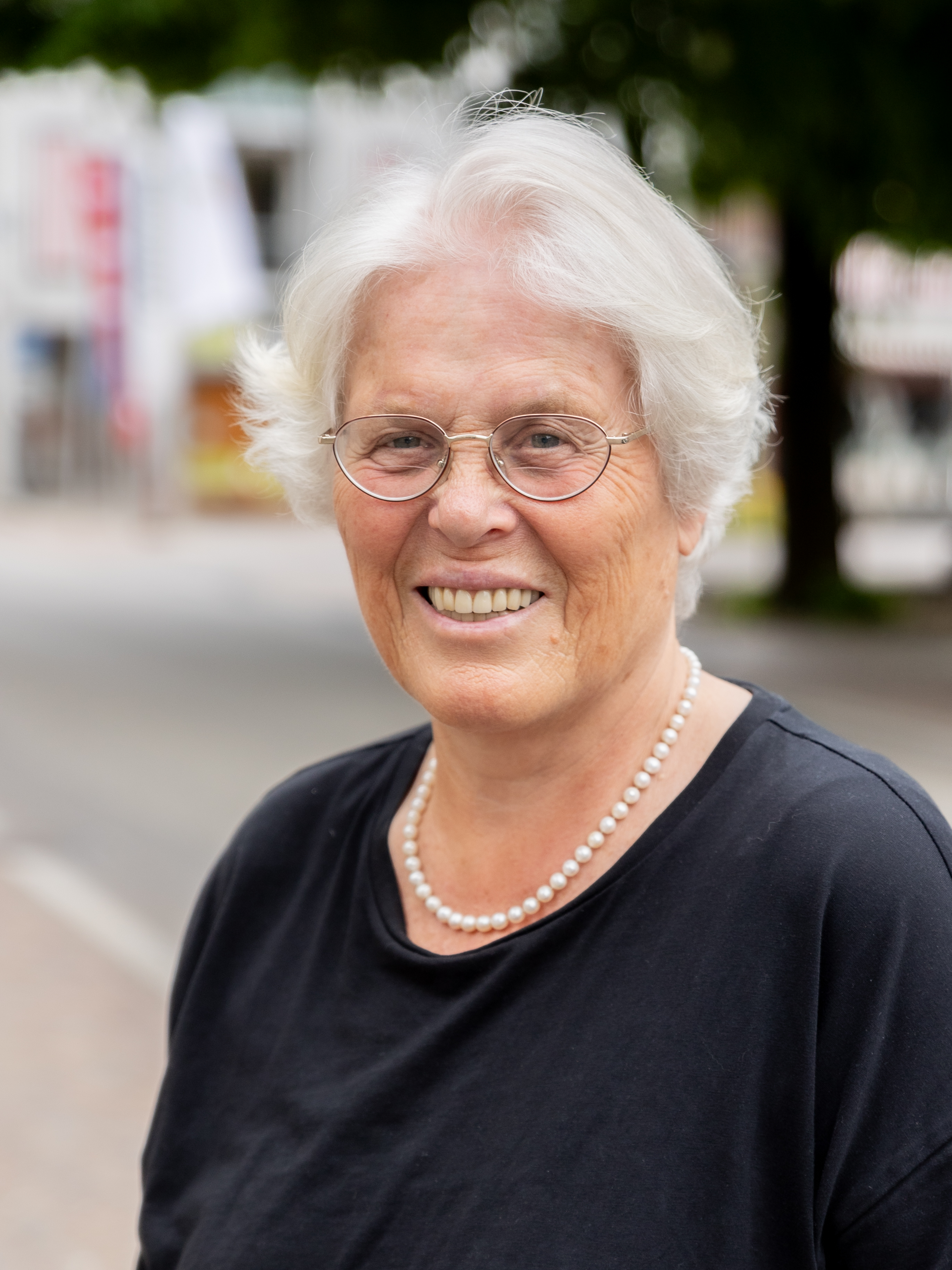
Sylvia Wetzel 2026

Sylvia Wetzel (born 5 July 1949 in Wolfach, Black Forest) is a Buddhist feminist, with a focus on the Buddhist community of Germany in the topics of meditation and spirituality among women.

== Life ==
Sylvia Wetzel studied political science and Slavistics in Heidelberg starting in 1968. During this time she was also politically active in the feminist movement. Sie had her first meeting with Tibetan Buddhists in Dharamsala in 1977. She became a student of Thubten Yeshe and later of Zopa Rinpoche, further studying with a number of others, including Prabhasa Dharma Roshi, Ayya Khema, Akong Rinpoche, and Rigdzin Shikpo. She is a member, worker, and advisor of the German Buddhist Union since 1984 and served as spokesperson for the group from 1985 until 1993. Wetzel gives meditation courses, holds lectures, writes books on the topic of Buddhism. Most of her lectures are held in Germany or Spain.

== See also ==
- Women in Buddhism - Khandro Rinpoche - Tenzin Palmo - Tsultrim Allione
