= Lothar Maier =

German politician

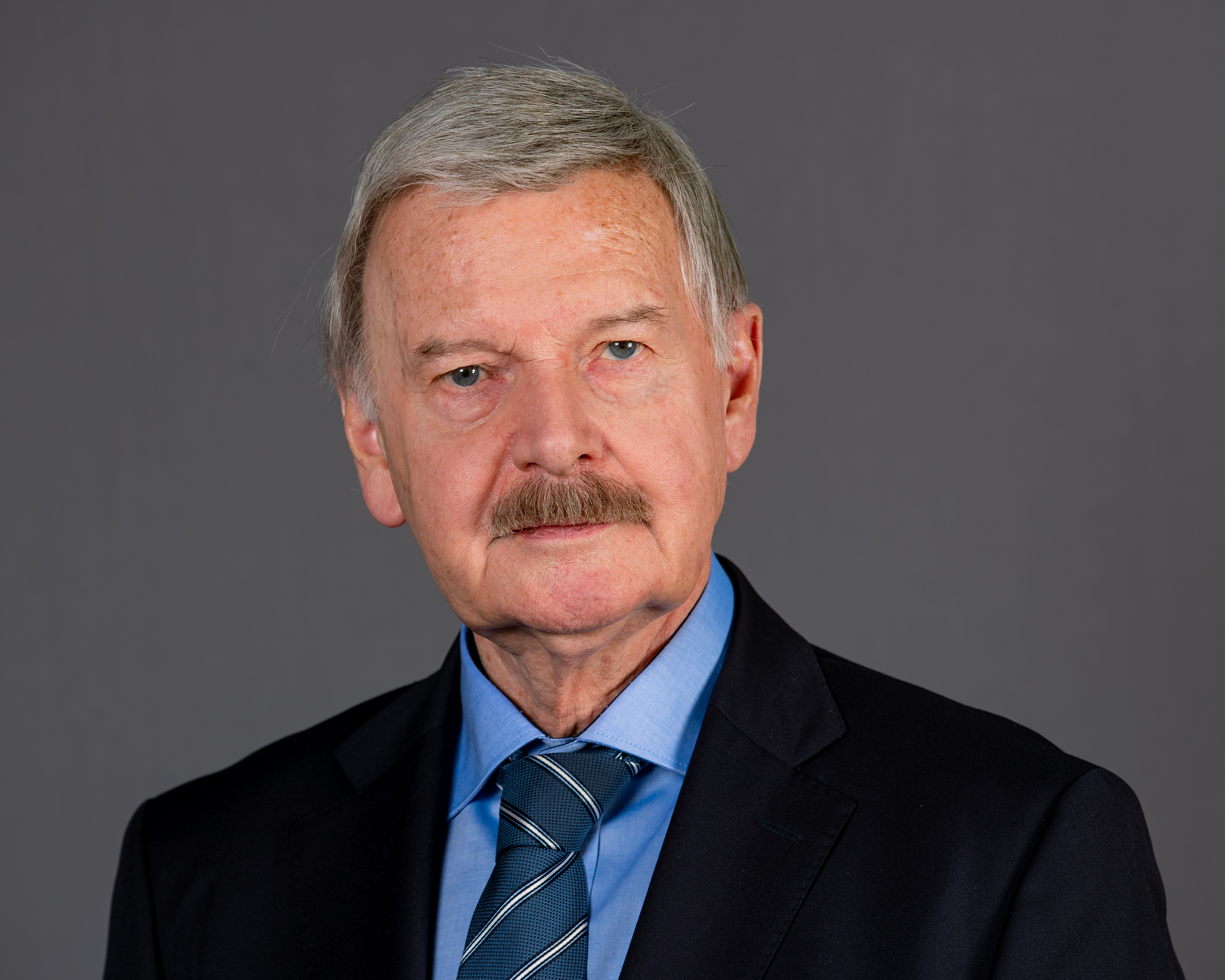
- Lothar Maier in 2020

Member of the Bundestag
- Incumbent
- Assumed office 2017

Personal details
- Born: 19 June 1944 (age 81) Wolfach, Nazi Germany
- Party: AfD

Lothar Maier (born 19 June 1944) is a German politician. Born in Wolfach, Baden-Württemberg, he represents Alternative for Germany (AfD). Lothar Maier has served as a member of the Bundestag from the state of Baden-Württemberg from 2017 to 2021.

== Life ==
He became member of the Bundestag after the 2017 German federal election. He is a member of the Committee on Legal Affairs and Consumer Protection.
