= Wolfach =

- Town
- Coat of arms

- Location of Wolfach within Ortenaukreis district
- Interactive map of Wolfach
- Location within Germany Location within Baden-Württemberg
- Coordinates: 48°18′N 8°13′E
- Country: Germany
- State: Baden-Württemberg
- Admin. region: Freiburg
- District: Ortenaukreis

Government
  - Mayor (2022–30): Thomas Geppert

Area
  - Total: 67.97 km^{2} (26.24 sq mi)
- Elevation: 262 m (860 ft)

Population (2025-12-31)
  - Total: 5,626
  - Density: 82.77/km^{2} (214.4/sq mi)
- Time zone: UTC+01:00 (CET)
  - Summer (DST): UTC+02:00 (CEST)
- Postal codes: 77709
- Dialling codes: 07834
- Vehicle registration: OG, BH, KEL, LR, WOL
- Website: wolfach.de

Wolfach (German pronunciation: [ˈvɔlfax]; Low Alemannic: Wolfä) is a town in the Black Forest and part of the Ortenaukreis in Baden-Württemberg (Germany) and borders the Freudenstadt and Rottweil districts.

== History ==
Wolfach was first mentioned in 1084 as Wolphaha and was given a wide variety of names throughout the High and early Late Middle Ages including Wolphaa, Wolua, Wolfacha, Wolva, Wolfach inferius, Wolva, Wolvahe, and Wolffach.

=== Antiquity and Early Middle Ages ===
Very little is known about Wolfach before 1000 and there were likely no large settlements in the area. Under Emperor Vespasian, the Roman Empire may have built a trade and military road from Offenburg to Rottweil which passed near the town around 73 AD.

=== Founding of the Town in the High Middle Ages ===
The exact age of Wolfach is not known. The noble De Wolphaha family is thought to have lived in the Ruine Wolfach, a hilltop castle that lay north of the town center and was built in the late 11th century.

By the 14th century, the people of Wolfach gained many civil liberties, including the freedom to hold markets. This allowed the town to grow in size and population.

=== Timber Rafting ===
As early as the 15th century, the lumber trade was an important source of income for Wolfach because of its location in the Black Forest. The timber trade was aided by timber rafting, which allowed for the cheap and easy delivery of timber to places as far as Strasbourg.

Timber rafting continued until the late 19th century when quicker and more efficient railways deemed the practice obsolete. In 1984, the Wolfach Kinzig Rafers Association (German: Wolfacher Kinzigflößer) was created to preserve the tradition of rafting. A festival is held biennially where rafts are built and floated down the river to celebrate the town's history of rafting.

=== Destruction by fires ===
Major fires have forced many of the buildings in the town center and the nearby suburbs to be rebuilt. The most recent major fire was in 1892, which burned the old town hall, school, and two neighbouring buildings. The town hall was rebuilt in 1892/93 in the neo-Renaissance style.

=== Modern ===
On April 21, 1945, before fleeing the town, the Gestapo took the French resistants and political prisoners held in the prison of Wolfach to a forest outside of the town, forced them to dig their own graves, and shot them on the spot, just three hours before the arrival of the French 2nd Armored Division commanded by General Leclerc.

== Geography ==
=== Geographical position ===
Wolfach lies where the two rivers Wolf and Kinzig meet in the Kinzig valley. The mountains and valleys surrounding the town stretch between 250 and 880 meters above sea level.

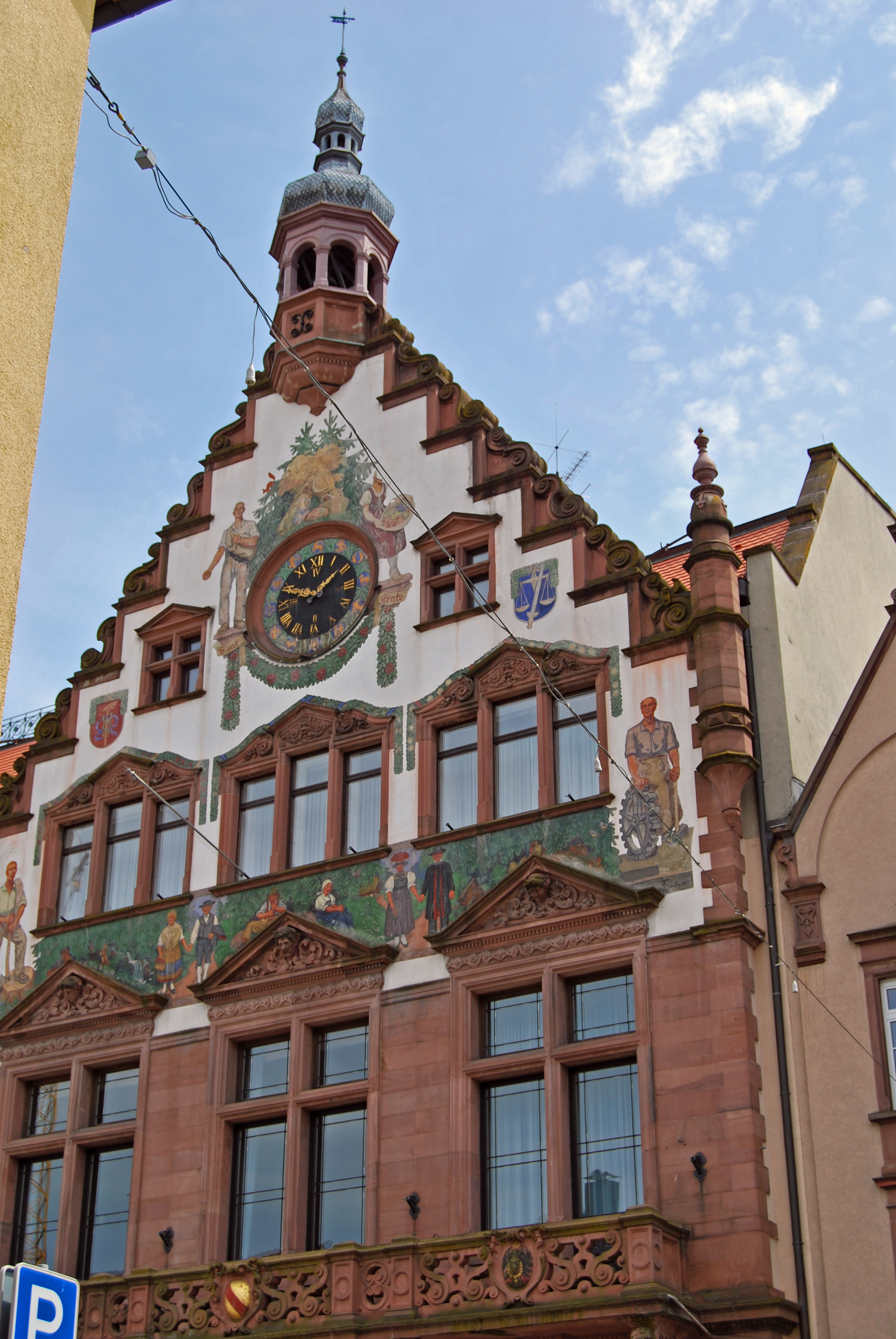
City Hall in Wolfach

District villages within the borough of Wolfach include Kirnbach, Halbmeil, Kinzigtal, and St. Roman.

=== Town Structure ===
The town center was originally divided into two parts to the north and south of the Kinzig river. The north section was developed as a suburb, where the St. Laurentius–Pfarrei, a Roman Catholic church, still stands today. The south section included a market street and is still lined with shops today. Both sides of the river have been developed to including housing, shops, and other markets. They are connected by a pedestrian bridge and a larger bridge for car traffic.

Due to the harsh topographical location, Wolfach has not received significant expansion. The most significant expansion was the Straßburger Hof, a suburban area which extends to the west of the town center and began construction in 1927.

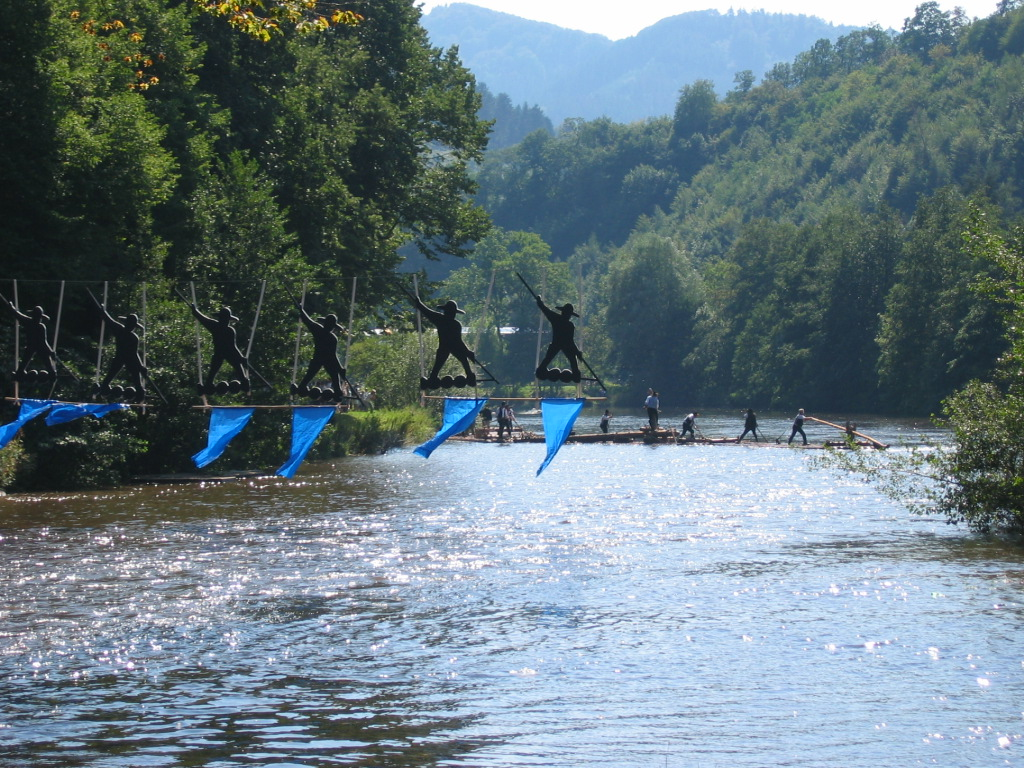
Kinzig in Wolfach

== Government ==
=== City council ===
In the past years the city council consisted of:

Party	1994	1999	2004	2009	2014	2019	2024
CDU	8 seats	10 seats	8 seats	6 seats	5 seats	6 seats	6 seats
SPD	5 seats	3 seats	3 seats	4 seats	5 seats	3 seats	4 seats
FW	6 seats	8 seats	7 seats	7 seats	6 seats	6 seats	6 seats
Greens	—	—	—	1 seat	2 seats	3 seats	2 seats

=== Mayor ===
The current mayor of Wolfach is Thomas Geppert, who was first elected in 2015. He was most recently re-elected in 2022, with 76% of the vote.

The mayoral history of Wolfach can be divided into two time periods. The first, from the founding of the town in the 13th century until 1811, is categorized by the title of "Schultheiß". Although the role was similar to a modern-day mayor, it focused more on tax and debt collection.

Term	Schultheiß	Lifespan	Notes
1291–1298	Sifrit, scultetus de Wolva		Name translates to "Sifrit, sculpted from the Wolf" in Latin and is thought to be the origin of the name "Wolfach"
1298–1303	Johans der Münster		
1328–1349	Friderich der Schultheiß		Stepped down in 1349
1377–unknown	Fritsch Briß		
1380–1382	Dolder von Owe		Son of Hainrichs von Owe, a knight
1382–unknown	Ulbricht Uberli		
1404–unknown	Hans Hag (also spelled Hagg and Haugg)		
1460–unknown	Cuonrat Schoemann		
1462–unknown	Diebolt		
1470–unknown	Burfart Snider		
1486–unknown	Laurenß Kraßer		
1490–unknown	Hans Renner		
1509–unknown	Christoffel		
1569–unknown	Seibmacher		
1586–unknown	Udam Spilmann	Died in 1609	
1608–unknown	Christoph Braf		
1609–1610	Lorenß Bedh	Died in 1610	
1610–1613	Joannes Bernhart	Died in 1613	
1613–1636	Joann Roos (also spelled Röß)	Died in 1636	
1636–1645	Jacob Lempp		
1645–1653	Batholomeus Glidh	Died in 1654	
1653–1669	Martin Holzer		Not part of the nobility of Wolfach. A stranger from Elzach, a town about 25 km southwest of Wolfach who was named the mayor.
1669–1689	Joseph Göß		
1690	Johann Losinger		Acted as an interim mayor
1690–1703	Geörg Leinhard Glidh		Resigned in 1703
1703–1721	Dratislaus Hildbrandt		
1721–1731	Johannes Jacobus Haaß		
1733–1757	Lorenz Sandhaas	Died in 1767	
1757–1769	Johannes Behr	Died in 1769	
1769–1783	Johann Georg Mast	Died in 1803	
1783–1801	Anton Reuf		
1801–1811	Johann Straub		

After 1811, the title was changed to "mayor" and the position became more formalized.

Term	Mayor	Lifespan	Notes
1811–1820	Johann Georg Neef		
1820–1829	Xavery Duppele		
1829–1834	Dr. Duttlinger		Resigned because his job as a doctor was not compatible with his mayorship
1834–1839	J. B. Baur		Previously acted as city clerk
1839–1861	Joseph Bührer		
1861–1874	J. G. Armbruster		Resigned due to health issues
1874–1886	Hermann Dogt		
1880–1900	Friedrich Armbruster		Worked as a merchant. Son of J. G. Armbruster.
1900–1909	Bruno Burger		
1909–1918	Karl Friedrich Armbruster		Son of Friedrich Armbruser and grandson of J. G. Armbruster
1918–1925	Gustav Bulacher		
1925–1936	August Hämmerle		Grandfather of Gerlinde Hämmerle, a former politician for the SPD
1937–1941	Adolf Oehler		Member of the NSDAP
1941–1944	Alfred Albanus		Member of the NSDAP
1944–1945	Hans Auer		Member of the NSDAP
1945–1946	Johannes Faißt		
1946–1951	Hans Allgeier		
1951–1978	Arthur Martin		
1978–1991	Hans-Peter Züfle	Born 1951/1952	
1992–2014	Gottfried Moser	Born 1945/1946	
Since 2015	Thomas Geppert	Born 1980/1981	

=== Coat of arms ===
The coat of arms of the town of Wolfach displays a golden wolf's hook rod on a blue background and is based on the "Wolfsangel" banner from the "Herren von Wolfach" (Lords of Wolfach) who established their control on the town in 1260. It is believed that they adopted the wolf trap sign as their banner having cleared the area of wolves to establish the town.

=== International relations ===
Wolfach is twinned with:

- Cavalaire-sur-Mer, France
- (United States) Richfield, Ohio
- Kreuzlingen, Switzerland

== Tourism ==
In the late 16th century, Wolfach started to become known as a spa town and throughout the following centuries, the people of Wolfach adapted to the increased tourism. In the late 19th and early 20th century, Wolfach received acclaim from the Berlin Magazine.

The First and Second World Wars hurt tourism to Wolfach drastically but in the post-war period, it was able to develop once again.

In 2019, Wolfach had 41,733 tourist visitors.

== Culture and Sights ==
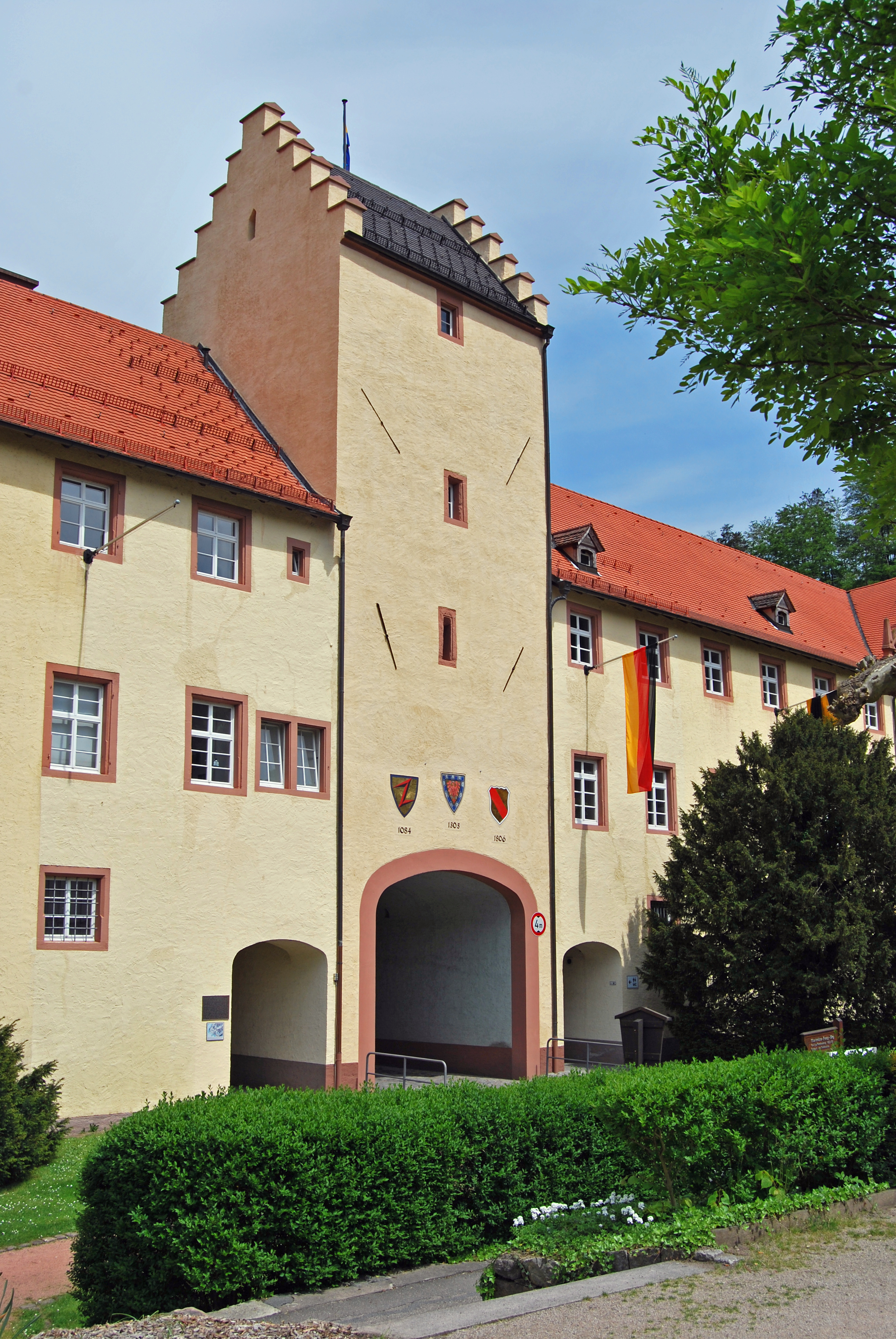
Schloss Wolfach

=== Swabian-Alemannic Carnival ===
Wolfach is rich in the tradition of the Swabian-Alemannic Fastnacht, where many in the town wear traditional costumes and masks in parades through the town.

=== Buildings ===
- Fürstenberger Schloss, a historic castle in the town center originating around 1180.
- Ruine Wolfach, the ruins of a castle near the town thought to have originated around 1030.
- St. Laurentius-Pfarrei, a late Gothic Roman Catholic church near the town center.
- Dorotheenhütte, a local glassblowing workshop which uses traditional Black Forest methods. Glassworks are blown, cut, and engraved in front of visitors.

=== Parks ===
- Flößerpark, a small park showcasing the history of timber rafting on the Kinzig river.

=== Regular events ===
- Fastnacht or Fasnet (Swabian-Alemannic Carnival), which features parades of Hansele wearing unique, often handmade costumes and masks.
- Stadtbrunnenfest, an annual festival which often features markets, shows, live music, arts and crafts, and more throughout the town.
- Biker-Weekend, which takes place on Corpus Christi weekend and sees hundreds of bikers riding through the Black Forest and stopping in small towns for food and to socialize.
- Flößerfest, a celebration of the town's history of timber rafting with the creation of new rafts and floating them down the Kinzig river.
- Schlachtfest der Freiwilligen Feuerwehr (Butchers Festival of the Volunteer Fire Department), where firefighters and other volunteers cook meat platters and for attendees.

== Notable people ==
=== Natives ===
- Ernst Bassermann (1854–1917), lawyer and politician, member of Reichstag
- Hans Klumbach (1904–1992), archaeologist and scholar of classical and provincial Roman studies
- Lothar Maier (born 1944), politician, (AfD)
- Sylvia Wetzel (born 1949), Buddhist feminist
- Thomas Dold (born 1984), track and field and extreme athlete and tower runner
- Markus Steuerwald (born 1989), volleyball player
- Felix Mildenberger (born 1990), a German conductor; principal conductor and artistic director of the Sinfonieorchester Crescendo Freiburg, which he helped found in 2014.
- Lena Rammsteiner (born 1995), a German female bodybuilder, currently an IFBB competitor in the women's Figure category.

=== People who are connected to the town ===
- Gustav Trunk (1871–1936), politician, member of the German Centre Party; lived in Wolfach from 1897 to 1900 as beadle
- Otmar Freiherr von Verschuer (1896–1969), racial hygienist in the Third Reich, went to school in Wolfach from 1898 to 1909

== See also ==
- Hausach, a neighbouring town
- Oberwolfach, a neighbouring town which is partially integrated with Wolfach
