= Benningen am Neckar =

- Municipality
- Coat of arms

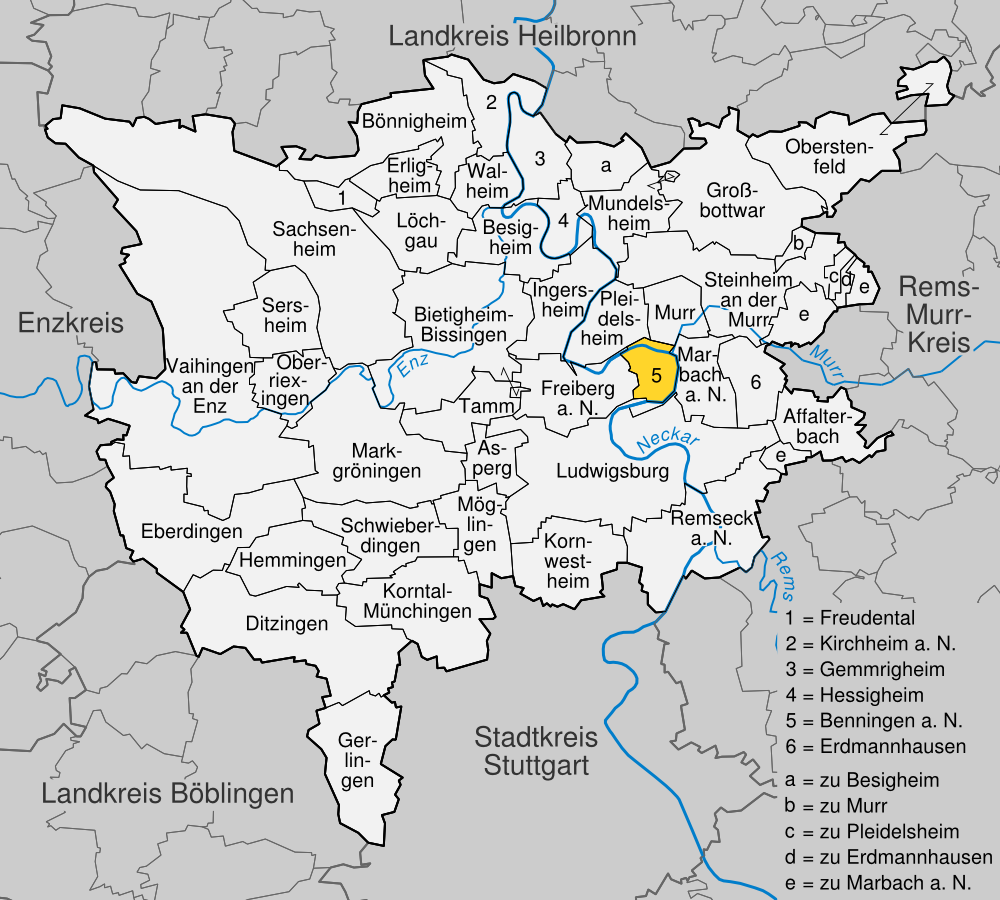
- Location of Benningen am Neckar within Ludwigsburg district
- Interactive map of Benningen am Neckar
- Location within Germany Location within Baden-Württemberg
- Coordinates: 48°56′42″N 09°14′33″E
- Country: Germany
- State: Baden-Württemberg
- Admin. region: Stuttgart
- District: Ludwigsburg

Government
  - Mayor (2023–31): Klaus Warthon

Area
  - Total: 4.87 km^{2} (1.88 sq mi)
- Elevation: 210 m (690 ft)

Population (2025-12-31)
  - Total: 6,260
  - Density: 1,290/km^{2} (3,330/sq mi)
- Time zone: UTC+01:00 (CET)
  - Summer (DST): UTC+02:00 (CEST)
- Postal codes: 71726
- Dialling codes: 07144
- Vehicle registration: LB
- Website: www.benningen.de

Benningen am Neckar (German pronunciation: [ˈbɛnɪŋən ʔam ˈnɛkaʁ], lit. 'Benningen on the Neckar'; Swabian: Bẽnnenge) is a municipality in the district of Ludwigsburg in Baden-Württemberg in Germany.

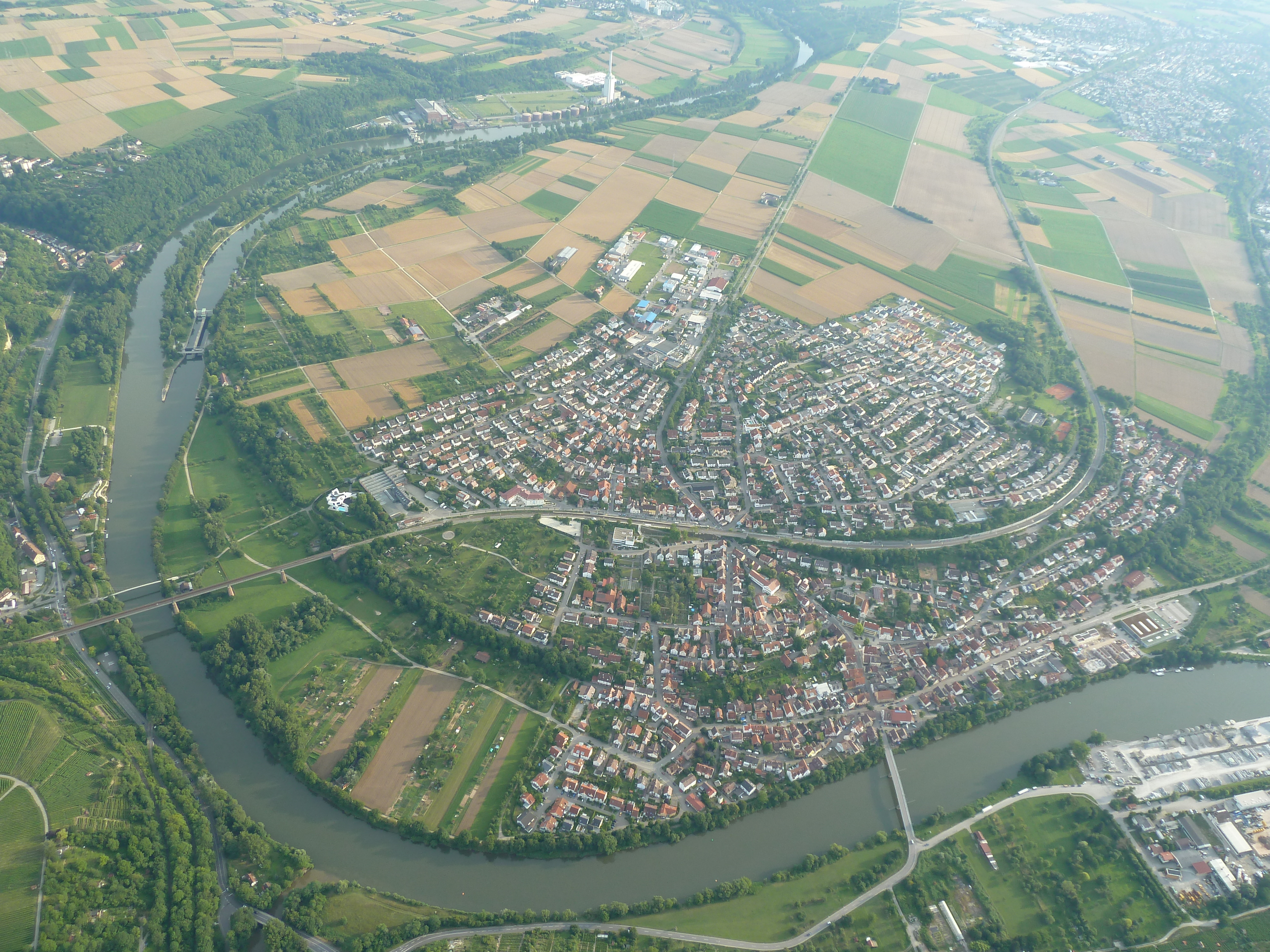
Benningen am Neckar

== History ==
By 85 AD, the Neckar-Odenwald line was the frontier of the Roman Empire. The Romans built the Limes Germanicus to secure this border. Along the border they built fortifications in regular distances, which included a small castrum on the south-eastern edge of today's village. The mouth of the river Murr into the river Neckar played probably a role towards the choice of the site's strategic location.

Around 150 AD the border and the fort were moved to the east towards Murrhardt, but a civilian settlement remained in place. By 260 AD, the Alemanni had displaced the Romans and settled in the area. The name Benningen probably derives from the name of the clan leader, who could have been called the Bunno. In 779 the town was first mentioned as Bunninga, when the monastery of Fulda obtained some property there. Other landowners were the Lorsch Abbey and the Bishopric of Speyer.

In the year 1351 and finally in 1497 the community passed to Württemberg and belonged to the Office of Marbach. From 1718 the newly established city of Ludwigsburg became the new center of the region, and so Benningen was reclassified in 1762 as part of the Ludwigsburg district.

In 1579 the school principal of the grammar school in neighboring Marbach, Simon Studion, discovered Roman ruins and led an excavation. Systematic archaeological excavations of the Roman castrum and town were made by General Edward of Kallee in the 19th century, who had recognised its strategic importance based on military considerations. His finds are now exhibited around the new City Hall, and inside the City Hall itself there is a Roman museum. Close by were found the remains of a Jupiter Column, which were typically crowned with a statue of Jupiter, usually on horseback, trampling down a Giant, often depicted as a snake. Another small museum in Benningen, which deals amongst other things with the Roman history of the place is the "Museum im Adler", housed in a former farm and inn from 1630.

== Sons and daughters of the town ==
- August Pauly, (1796–1845), classical scholar and publisher
- Gottlieb Storz, (1852–1939), pioneer entrepreneur in Omaha, Nebraska, founder of the Storz Brewery
- Willi Entenmann, (1943–2012), football player (VfB Stuttgart) and coach
