= Analbuminaemia =

- Other names: Congenital analbuminemia
- This condition is inherited in an autosomal recessive manner
- Specialty: Endocrinology
- Symptoms: mild oedema, reduced blood pressure, fatigue.
- Usual onset: Adulthood
- Causes: Genetic
- Frequency: Approximately one per million

Analbuminaemia or analbuminemia is a rare genetically inherited metabolic defect characterised by an impaired synthesis of serum albumin. Although albumin is the most common serum protein, analbuminaemia is a benign condition.

== Signs and symptoms ==
Analbuminaemia often presents in adulthood, with benign clinical features, such as mild oedema, low blood pressure and fatigue. Some patients may develop more serious symptoms such as lower body lipodystrophy. Severe hypercholesterolemia with increased serum low-density lipoprotein-cholesterol concentration and increased esterified cholesterol are often observed. Free fatty acids and raised apolipoprotein B may occur as well as increased serum high-density lipoprotein-3 and apolipoprotein A-I and A-II levels.

It was shown that these persons have a normal life expectancy without substantial impairments.
