= Late Roman ridge helmet =

Type of Roman helmet

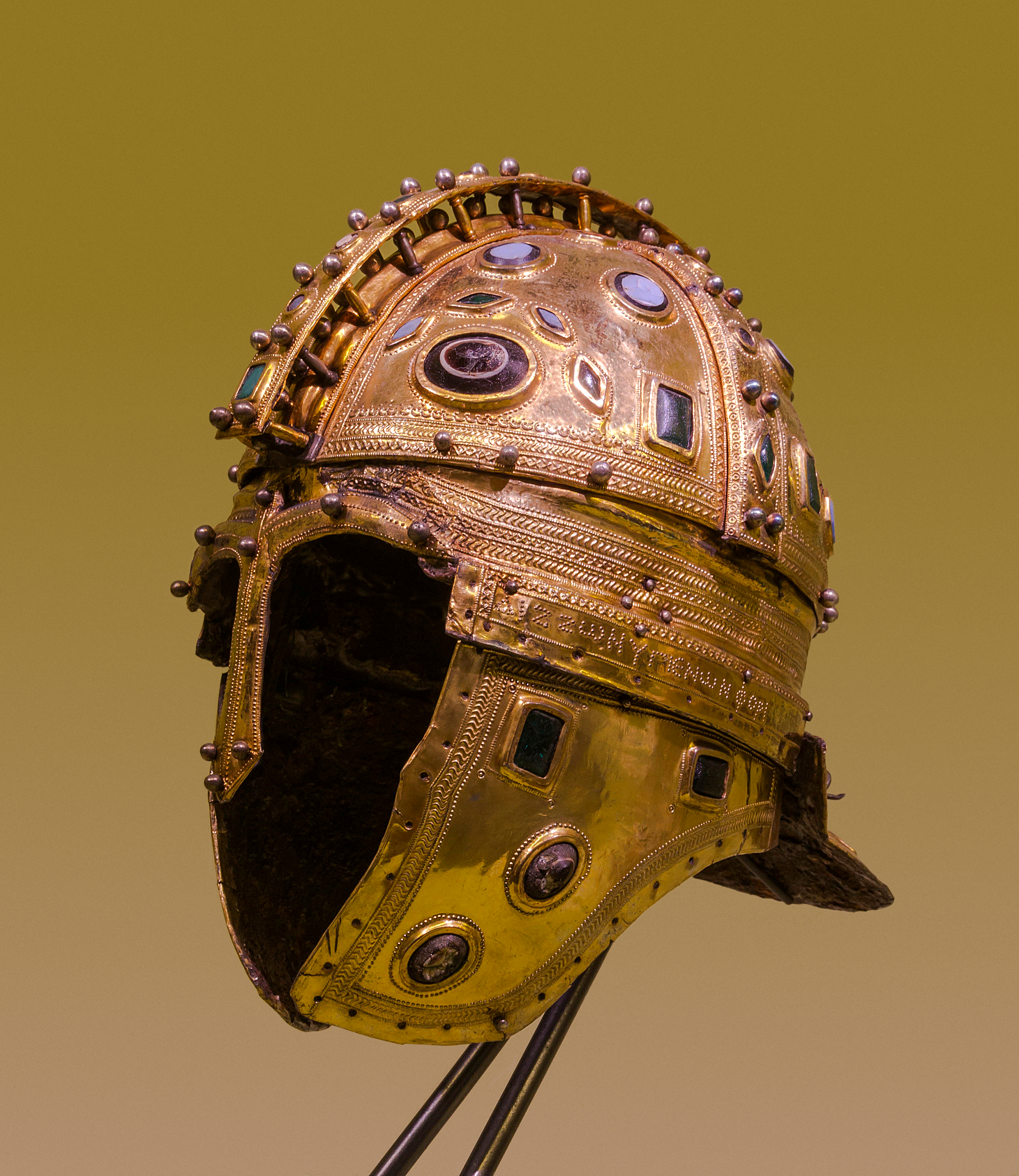
Roman ridge helmet (Berkasovo I), early 4th century AD. Made of iron and sheathed in silver-gilt, it is decorated with glass gems. From the "Berkasovo treasure", Museum of Vojvodina, Novi Sad (Serbia).

The Late Roman ridge helmet was a type of combat helmet of Late Antiquity used by soldiers of the Late Roman army. It was characterized by the possession of a bowl made up of two or four parts, united by a longitudinal ridge.

== Origins ==
In the late 3rd century, a complete break in Roman helmet design occurred. Previous Roman helmet types, based ultimately on Celtic designs, specifically the 'Port' type, were replaced by new forms derived from helmets developed in the Sassanid Empire. A closely related form to the Roman ridge helmets is represented by a single helmet from Dura Europos which is of similar construction, but has a much higher-vaulted skull. It probably belonged to a Sassanid warrior of the 3rd century. This reinforces the evidence for a Sassanid origin of this type of helmet. Two main forms of helmet construction were adopted by the Romans at much the same time: the ridge helmet, described here, and the Spangenhelm, which was likely adopted from the Sarmatians. The earliest confirmed example of a Late Roman ridge helmet is the Richborough helmet, which dates to about 280 AD.

== Usage ==
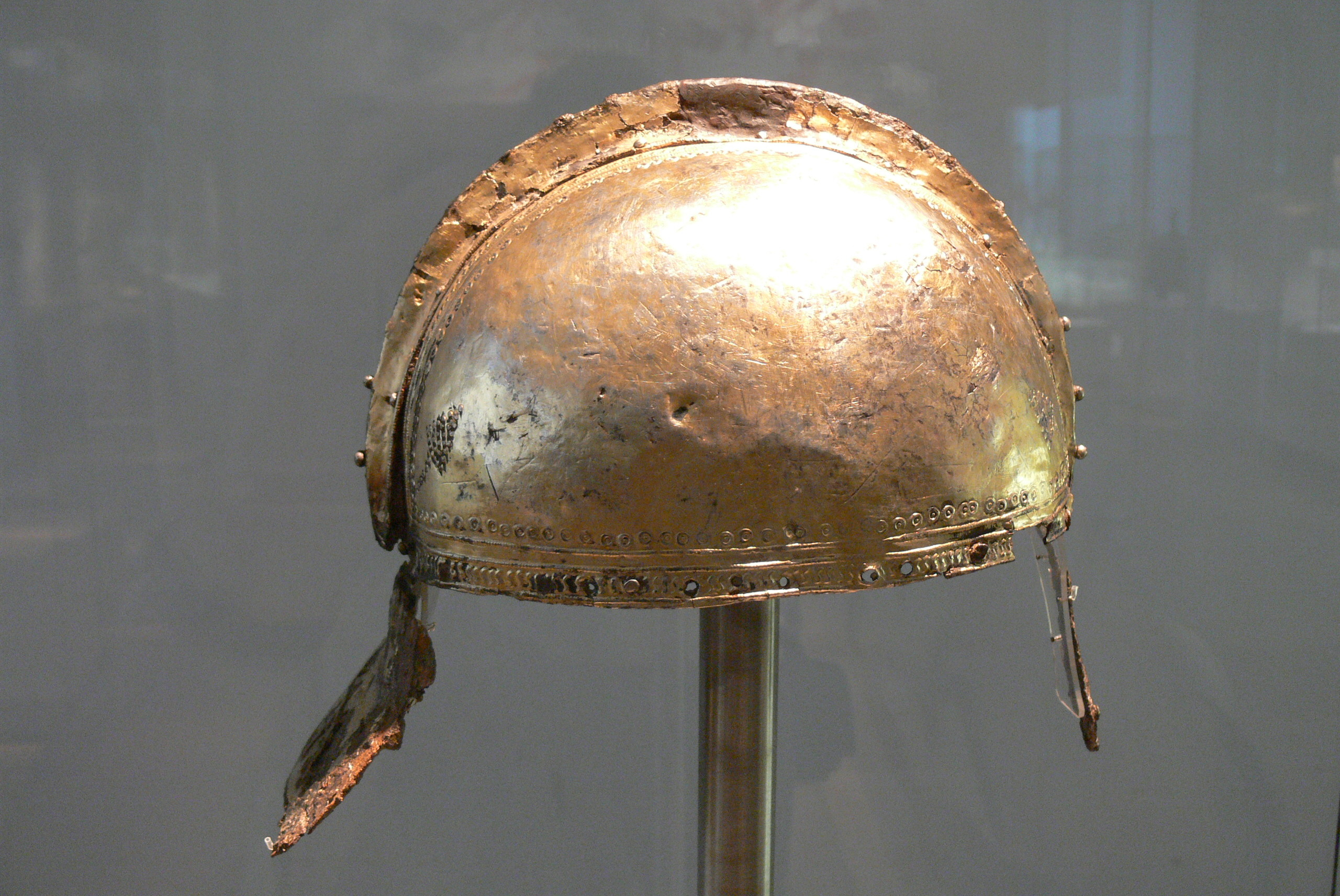
Ridge helmet of the Intercisa type, with a bipartite skull. It is missing its cheek guards

Earlier Roman cavalry helmet types usually have cheek guards that have a section covering the ears, whereas infantry helmets do not. Many authors have extrapolated from this that the Intercisa-type helmets were infantry helmets, while the Berkasovo-type helmets were cavalry examples, based mostly on the existence of ear holes in the Intercisa-type. One Berkasovo-type helmet, the Deurne helmet, has an inscription to a cavalry unit of the equites stablesiani, tending to support this hypothesis. The Berkasovo I helmet was found along with horse equipment. However, both Intercisa- and Berkasovo-types are depicted being worn by infantry and cavalry in Roman art, and some finds of these helmets, such as the Burgh Castle example, show they were used interchangeably.

Late Roman ridge helmets are depicted for the first time on coins of Constantine the Great and are believed to have come into use between 270 and 300 AD. The last archaeological examples date to the early 5th century, and include the River Maas Helmet, dated to 409–411 by coins of Constantine III, and the Concești example, found in a Hunnic burial. The ridge helmet remained in artistic usage well into the 7th century and possibly later. Helmets with a rounded shape are also illustrated in Byzantine manuscripts of the 10–12th centuries, and may have been derived from the earlier Roman 'ridge helmet'.

Early copies of ridge helmets include the Fernpass example, dated to the 4th century and found in Austria, and believed to belong to a Germanic warrior who had his own helmet modified to look like a ridge helmet.

== Characteristics ==
=== Construction ===
Unlike earlier Roman helmets, the skull of the ridge helmet is constructed from more than one element. Roman ridge helmets can be classified into two types of skull construction: bipartite and quadripartite, also referred to as Intercisa-type and Berkasovo-type, respectively. The bipartite construction method is usually characterized by a two-part bowl united by a central ridge running from front to back and small cheekpieces, also it lacks a base-ring running around the rim of the bowl. Some examples of the bipartite construction also utilize metal crests, such as in the Intercisa-IV and River Maas examples. The second type of helmet has a quadripartite construction, characterized by a four-piece bowl connected by a central ridge, with two plates (connected by a reinforcing band) on each side of the ridge, and a base-ring uniting the elements of the skull at the rim of the helmet; this type is further characterised by large cheekpieces. Many examples of this helmet also have a nasal. In all types it is believed that the cheekpieces were attached to the skull by a helmet liner and the separate neck guard was attached by flexible leather straps, the buckles of which survive on some examples.

There are notable exceptions to this classification method, which include the Iatrus and Worms helmets, which have large cheekpieces and a base ring respectively. Other helmets also contain minor variations.

=== Decoration ===
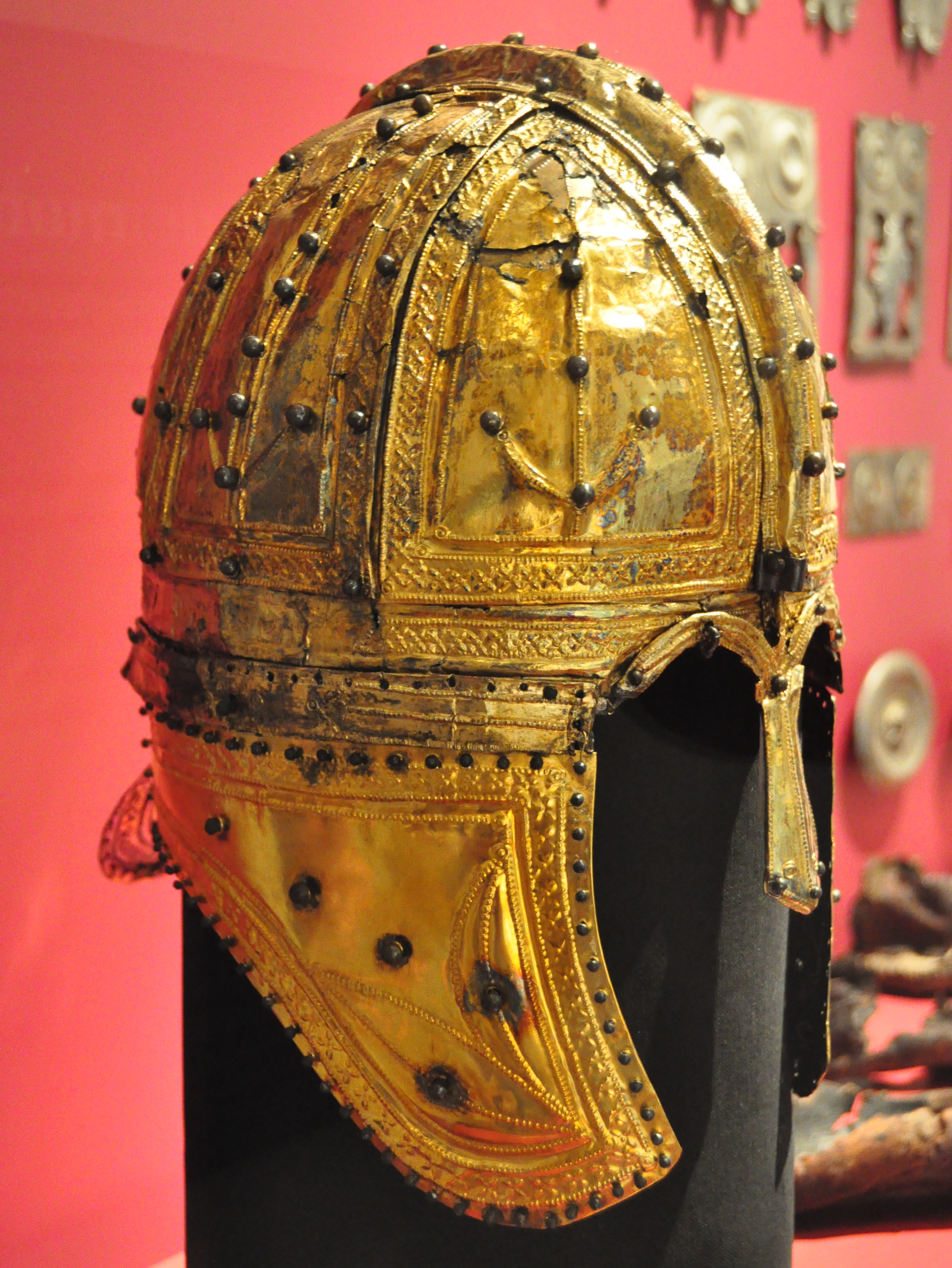
Late Roman ridge helmet (Berkasovo-type), found at Deurne, Netherlands. It is covered in silver-gilt sheathing and is inscribed to a cavalryman of the equites stablesiani.

The majority of examples excavated to date have evidence of either decorative silvering of the iron, or are covered by costly silver or silver-gilt sheathing, a job entrusted to men called barbaricarii. The amount of silver and gold used in the sheathing was officially graded by rank and was sometimes inscribed on the helmet. For example, the Deurne helmet has the weight of silver recorded on the outside and had 368/9 grams of silver and a small amount of gold in the gilding. Additional decoration is found on some surviving helmets; for example the Berkasovo-I example is decorated with many glass gems on the bowl, cheekpieces, and neckguard. The emperors Constantine I and Valentinian I are recorded as owning gem-encrusted gold helmets; in the case of the emperors, the gems would have been precious jewels, rather than paste. For a number of extant helmets, all that remains is the decorative silver or gold sheathing, the iron having corroded away entirely. A single helmet found at Intercisa in Hungary, where a hoard of 15–20 helmets was unearthed, has a tall, integral, iron crest attached to the ridge. A similar helmet found at Augst has three slots in its ridge for the attachment of a separate crest. There have also been finds of unattached crest pieces, or ones attached to only the ridge-piece of a helmet, the skull not having survived.

=== Typology ===
- Intercisa-type (bipartite), named after Intercisa hoard in Hungary.
  - Intercisa helmets I–IV
- Berkasovo-type (quadripartite), named after Berkasovo hoard in Serbia. A total of 15 specimen are known.
  - Berkasovo helmets I–III, three specimen held at the Museum of Vojvodina, I–II found at Berkasovo in 1955, III at Jarak in 2006. Berkasovo I is regarded the most beautiful and magnificent specimen of Roman ridge helmets. The owners were high-ranking cavalry soldiers, active in the 4th century.
  - Deurne helmet, a specimen held at the Rijksmuseum van Oudheden, found at Deurne in Netherlands in 1910. The owner served in one of Constantine the Great's elite cavalry units.

== Legacy ==
Many helmets of the Germanic states of Western and Northern Europe in the Early Middle Ages are derivations of the Roman ridge helmet, these include the Anglo-Saxon Coppergate helmet.

== Bibliography ==
- Bishop, M. C.; Coulston, J. C. (1989). Roman Military Equipment: From the Punic Wars to the Fall of Rome. Aylesbury: Shire Publications. ISBN 978-0-74780-005-7.
- Bishop, M.C. and Coulston J.C. (2006) Roman Military Equipment: From the Punic Wars to the Fall of Rome, Oxbow Books. ISBN 9781842171707
- Connolly, Peter (1998). Greece and Rome at War. London: Greenhill Books. ISBN 978-1-85367-303-0.
- Dawson, Timothy; McBride, Angus (2007). Byzantine Infantryman. Eastern Roman Empire c.900–1204. Oxford: Osprey Publishing. ISBN 978-1-84603-105-2.
- Driel-Murray, Carol Van, (2000) A late Roman assemblage from Deurne (Netherlands), Bonner Jahrbücher, 2000 - journals.ub.uni-heidelberg.de
- James, Simon (1986). "Evidence from Dura Europos for the Origins of Late Roman Helmets". Syria. 63 (1–2). Institut Francais du Proche-Orient: 107–134. doi:10.3406/syria.1986.6923.
- Johnson, Stephen (1980). "A Late Roman Helmet from Burgh Castle". Britannia. 11. Society for the Promotion of Roman Studies: 303–312. doi:10.2307/525684. JSTOR 525684.
- Klumbach, Hans (1973). Spätrömische Gardehelme. Beck. ISBN 978-3-40600-485-8.
- Lyne, Malcolm (1994). "Late Roman Helmet Fragments from Richborough". Journal of Roman Military Equipment Studies. 5: 97–105.
- Southern, Pat; Dixon, Karen R. (1996). The Late Roman Army. London: B.T. Batsford Limited. ISBN 978-0-30006-843-6.
- Stanković Pešterac, Tijana (2019). Roman Gilded Helmets of the Museum of Vojvodina (PDF). Novi Sad: Museum of Vojvodina. ISBN 978-86-81086-38-4.
