= Eduard von Kallee =

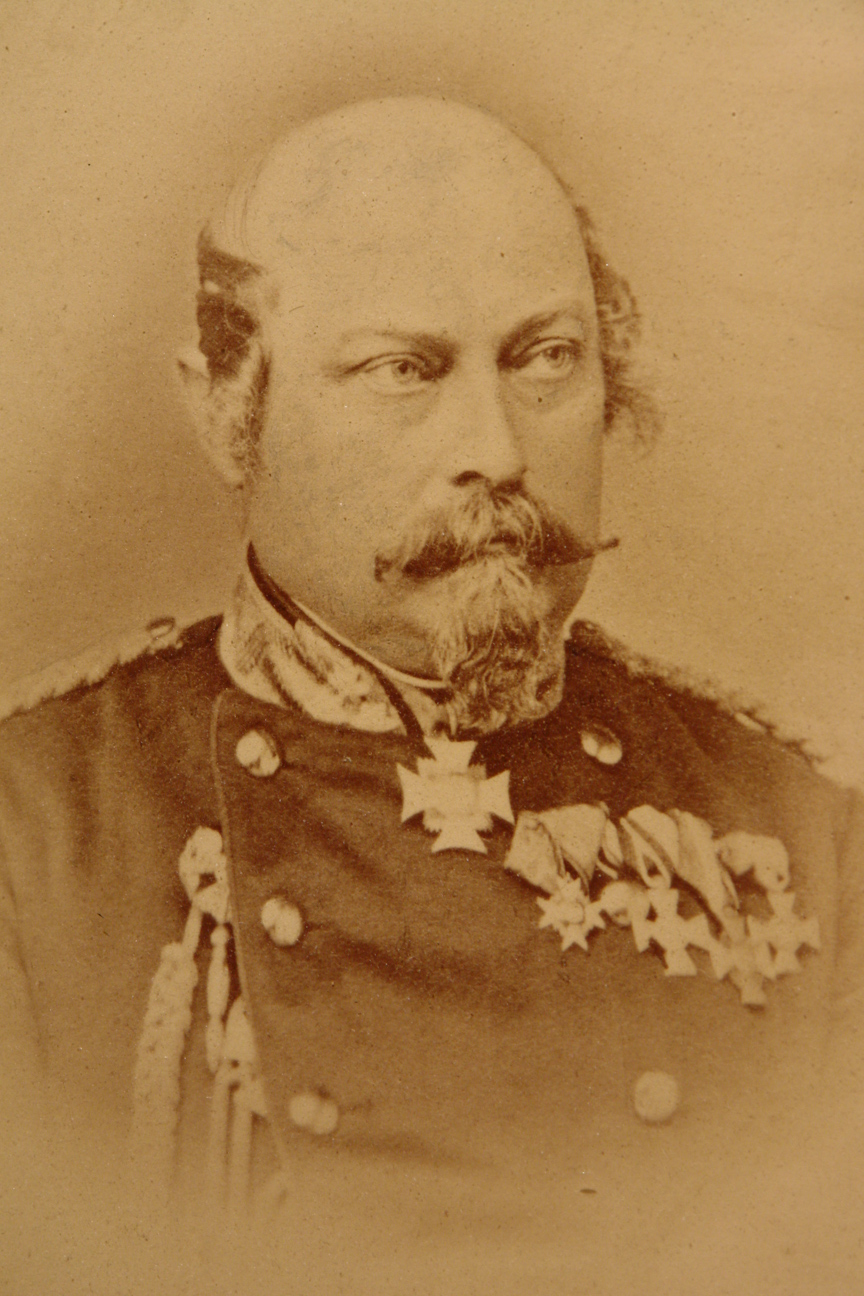
General Eduard von Kallee

Eduard von Kallee (26 February 1818 in Ludwigsburg – 15 June 1888 in Stuttgart) was a German Major General and archaeologist.

== Biography ==
From 1841 Kallee was adjutant to the Kingdom of Württemberg's Chief of Staff, and when he became a lieutenant in 1852 he received the Knight's Cross of the Order of the Crown (Württemberg) and the associated personal nobility status. He also received the 4th Class Order of the Red Eagle of the Kingdom of Prussia, the Hessian Order of Merit of Philip I and the Commander Class of Friedrich Order.

In 1860, he was promoted colonel, which demonstrates the evidence of extraordinary confidence in him by King William I of Württemberg, whose illegitimate son he probably was. His mother Juliana Kallee Eleonora, née Schuessler, who was born in Stuttgart and died there in 1839, was first married to the steward in the Royal Palace, Christian Wagner, and later married to Gottlieb Kallee, the Court Gardener of the widowed queen. It is recorded that King William I tapped the young Kallee "on the shoulder when he announced his decision that he wanted to become an officer (and not a painter)." This was felt to be an exceptional favour, because "the king did not touch easily someone, even princes could boast only rarely that he had shaken their hand." He married Malvine Majer, and on 18 December 1854 their son Richard Kallee was born, who later became parish priest of Feuerbach.

As Major General he reluctantly took part in the battles of Tauberbischofsheim and Gerchsheim. From 1869 he devoted himself to literary, artistic and archaeological studies, especially research on the Roman Limes. He was an early archaeologist at the forts of Köngen, Benningen am Neckar, Schirenhof and Unterböbingen, which are now listed as part of a UNESCO World Heritage Site. He chose the places of his excavations based on assessing military strategic considerations. He acquired and spread his knowledge about Roman history also on the Limes Gate Dalkingen, which he interpreted as a military outpost, and in Rottenburg am Neckar.

== Paintings ==
Eduard von Kallee produced sketches, watercolors, engravings, and oil paintings in the Biedermeier style.

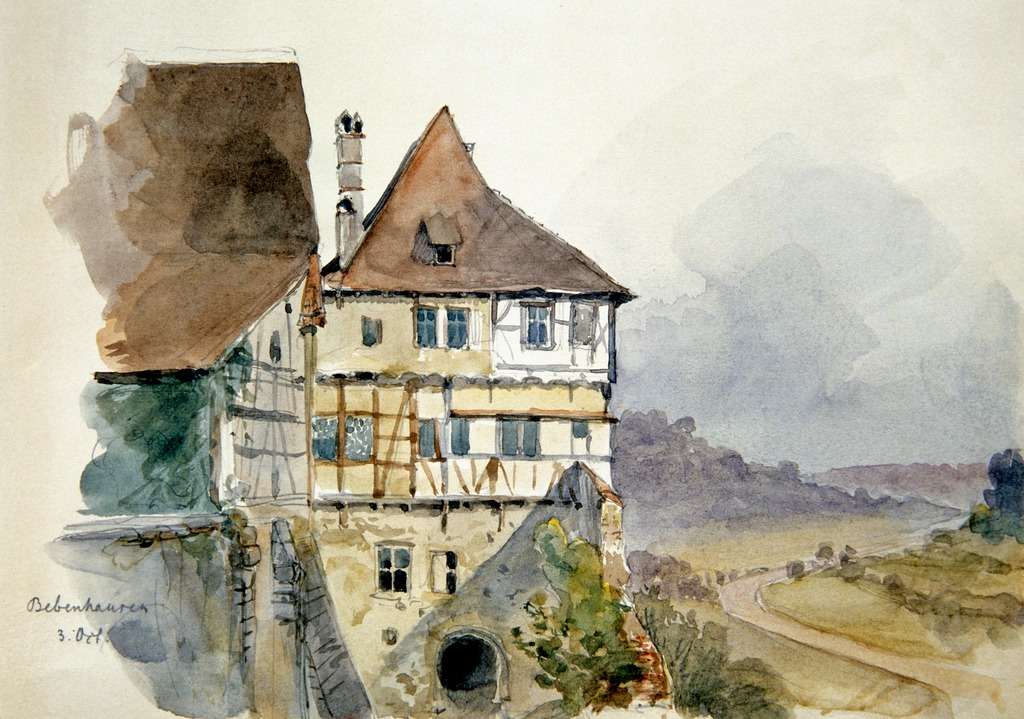
Bebenhausen Abbey

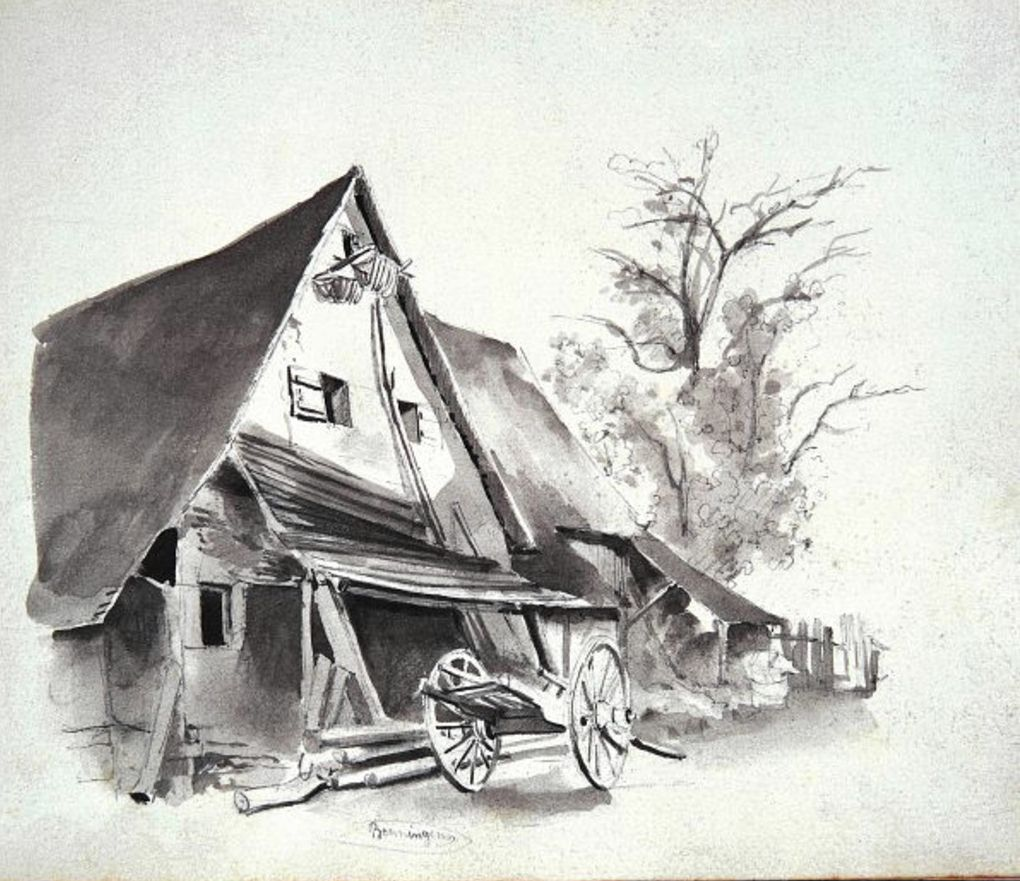
Old farm in Benningen am Neckar

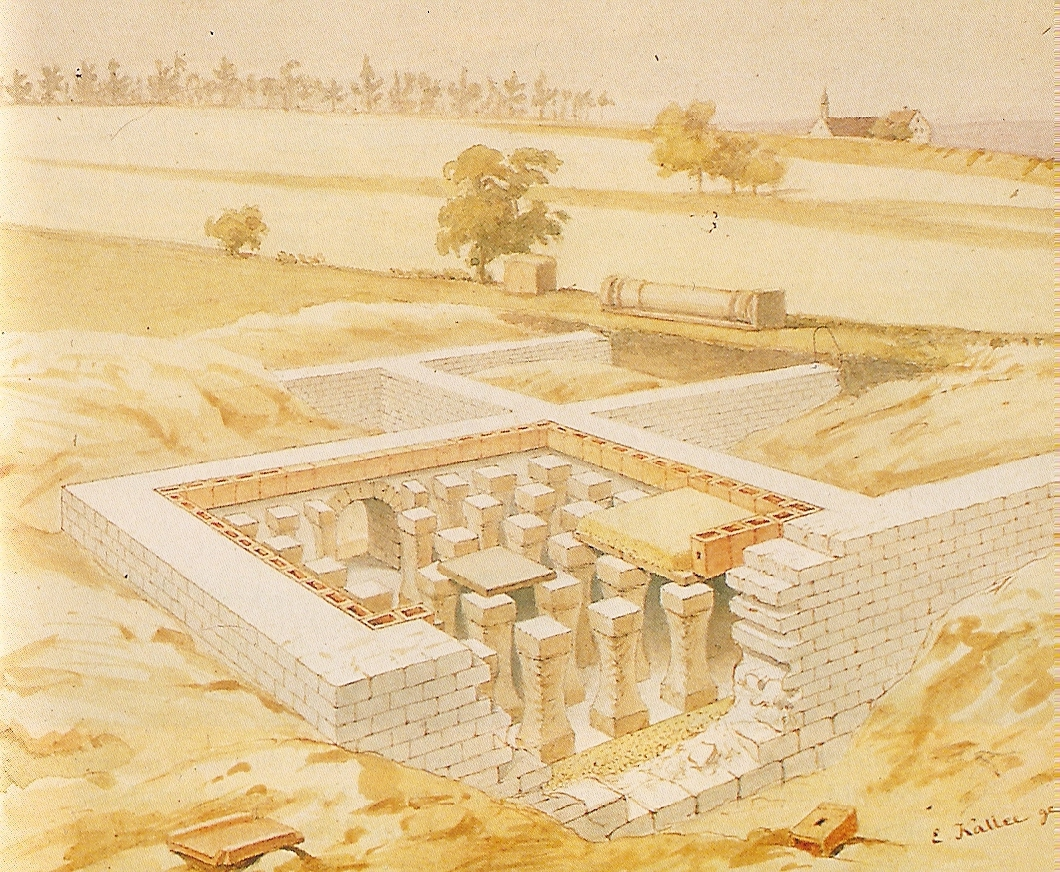
Roman bath in Rottenburg

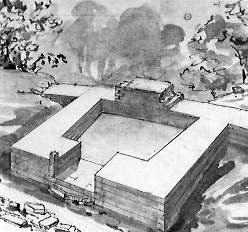
Tower at the Roman castle of Köngen

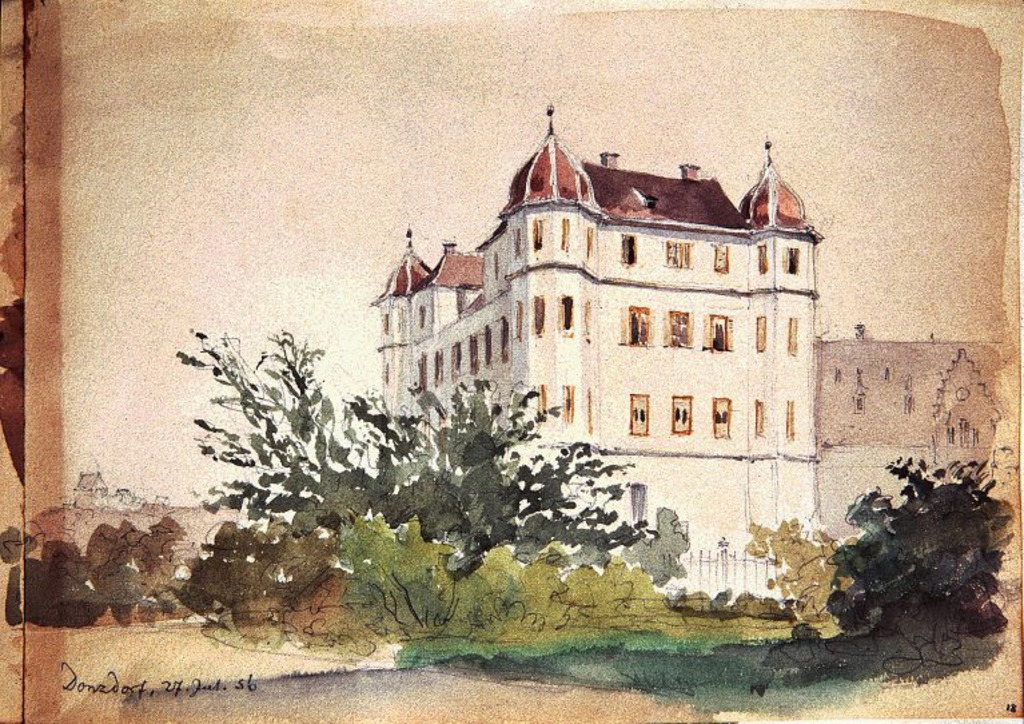
Donzdorf Castle
