= Richard Kallee =

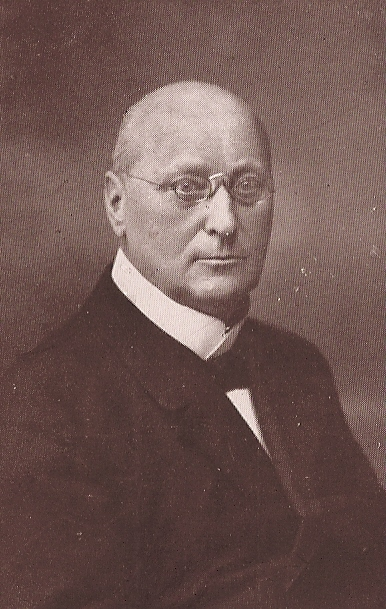
Richard Kallee

Richard Kallee (18 December 1854 – 15 July 1933) was a German Protestant pastor.

== Life and work ==
Richard Kallee was born on 18 December 1854 in Ludwigsburg.

On 7 October 1877 he was ordained in the church of Böblingen and then worked in the parishes of Willsbach, Michelbach am Wald and the Collegiate Church of Oehringen. He married Mathilde née Wunderlich, a daughter of the pastor Albert Wunderlich in Echterdingen. The couple had two sons: Walter Kallee was born in 1881, and Albert Kallee in 1884. On 15 September 1896 he took over the parish in Feuerbach, near Stuttgart. On 16 July 1916 he received the Charlotte Cross from Queen Charlotte of Württemberg, when she visited his nursery. His service ended in October 1923 with the retirement.

Like his father, General Eduard von Kallee he was an enthusiastic historian and archaeologist. In Pfedelbach he identified a ring of pre-Roman walls and mounds. He discovered in 1903 prehistoric fortifications and a village fortress on the Lemberg (Stuttgart).

From 1904 he discovered several Alemannic graves, tombs and sandstone cists in Feuerbach. A total of 102 tombs were excavated and documented by him and his team. Together with his helpers he took great care to recover 760 artifacts from these Alemannic graves: skulls and bones, coins, pottery shards, combs, necklaces, belts, locks, swords, spears, arrows and spores, which he researched and published up to the end of his life.

In August and September 1912, the finds from the excavations were exhibited on the Feuerbach trade exhibition, where they were presented to a large number of spectators. On the first Sunday of the exhibition more than twenty thousand visitors attended the show, and on 16 September King William II of Württemberg also took his time to get an explanation of the exhibits by Kallee. An exhibition brochure was published especially for this event with the title "Feuerbach in Prehistory and Early History: Guide to the Feuerbach Antiquities Collection" at a cost of 30 pfennigs. On 4 November 1926 the Feuerbach Museum of Local History was inaugurated under Kallee's directorate. In 1938, the former Paulinenstrasse was renamed in his memory to Kalleestrasse.

He died in Feuerbach on 15 July 1933, just three weeks after his wife, and was buried in an honorary grave in the cemetery there, which is still maintained by Stuttgart City Council. His funeral was attended by the Stuttgart Mayor Paul, some representatives of the Tübingen Royal Society Roigel, the Swabian Schiller Society and the Wednesday Club. The pastor of Cannstatt Jöhne praised his eloquence, his open, healthy character, which had however no lack of corners and edges, and especially his love for the homeland and its history. The local historian and museum curator Prof. Peter Goessler said in his obituary: "Kallee was mentally agile, versatile, interested, and capable of quickly reporting about things that impressed him as a skilled orator and writer."
