= Jupiter Column =

Type of Roman Germanic monument

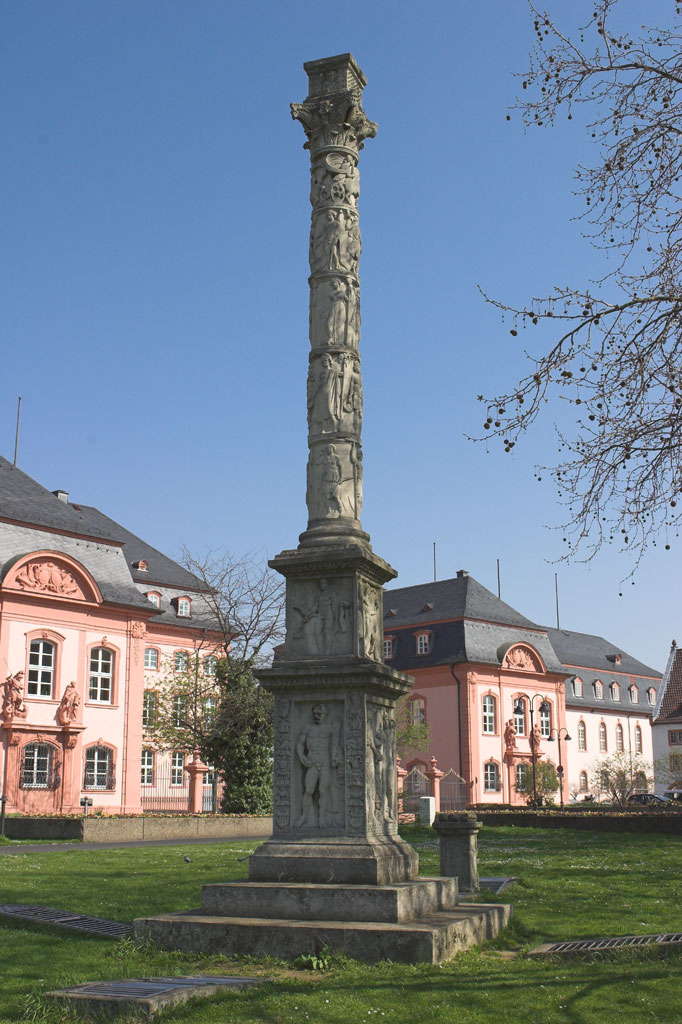
Jupitersäule outside the parliament at Mainz (Reconstruction, original is in the Landesmuseum Mainz)

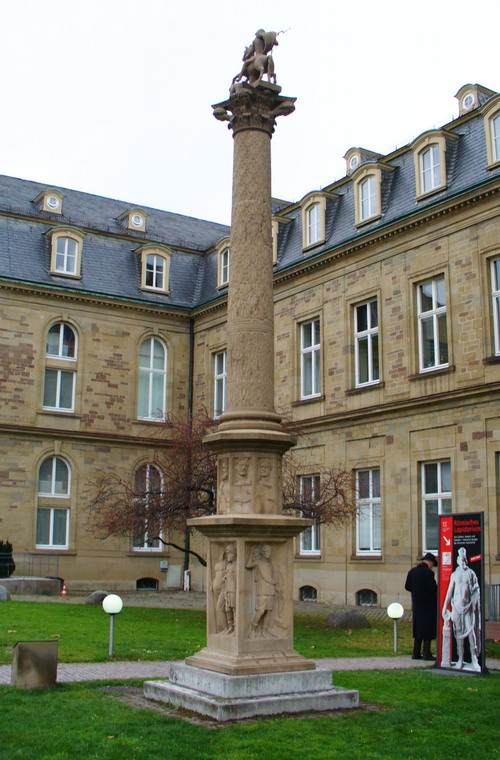
Jupitersäule at the New Palace of Stuttgart, Reconstruction of the column from Hausen an der Zaber

A Jupiter Column (German: Jupitergigantensäule or Jupitersäule) is a monument belonging to a type widespread in Roman Germania.

== Description ==
Jupiter Column pillars express the religious beliefs of their time. They were erected in the 2nd and 3rd centuries AD, mostly near Roman settlements or villas in the Germanic provinces. Some examples also occur in Gaul and Britain.

The base of the monuments was normally formed by a Viergötterstein (four gods stone), in itself a common monument type, usually depicting Juno, Minerva, Mercury, and Hercules. This would support a Wochengötterstein (a carving depicting the personifications of the seven days of the week), which, in turn, supported a column or pillar, normally decorated with a scale pattern. The column was crowned with a statue of Jupiter, usually on horseback, trampling a Giant (usually depicted as a snake). In some cases, such as at Walheim, the column capital is decorated with four heads, usually interpreted as depictions of the four times of day (morning, midday, evening, night). The total height of a Jupiter Column is normally around 4 meters, but some examples are taller, including a famous example at Mainz with a height of more than 9 meters.

The columns in Upper Germany normally depict Jupiter defeating a Giant, as described above, and are thus known as Jupitergigantensäulen ("Jupiter-Giant-Columns"). In Lower Germany, Jupiter is normally depicted enthroned without the Giant; those monuments are commonly described simply as Jupitersäulen ("Jupiter Columns").

The pillars were often placed within a walled enclosure and accompanied by an altar.

No such monument has survived intact. They are known from excavated finds or from secondary use as spolia used in the construction of Christian churches. Recently, reconstructions of some Jupiter Columns have been erected at or near where they were found, such as at Ladenburg, Obernburg, Benningen am Neckar, Sinsheim, Stuttgart, Mainz, and near the Saalburg.

According to the historian Greg Woolf, the pillars depict the victory of Jupiter Optimus Maximus over the forces of Chaos, the god himself being raised high above the other gods and humankind, but closely linked with them. Woolf sees most such monuments as dedications by individuals.

== Bibliography ==
- Die Iupitersäulen in den germanischen Provinzen. Rheinland-Verlag, Köln 1981. (Bonner Jahrbücher, Beihefte 41) Includes: Gerhard Bauchhenß: Die Jupitergigantensäulen in der römischen Provinz Germania superior; Peter Noelke: Die Jupitersäulen und -pfeiler in der römischen Provinz Germania inferior. ISBN 3-7927-0502-8
- Gerhard Bauchhenß: Jupitergigantensäulen. Stuttgart 1976. (Kleine Schriften zur Kenntnis der römischen Besetzungsgeschichte Südwestdeutschlands, 14)
- Greg Woolf: Representation as Cult: the Case of the Jupiter Columns. In: Wolfgang Spickermann et al. (eds.): Religion in den germanischen Provinzen Roms. Mohr Siebeck, Tübingen 2001, S.117ff., ISBN 3-16-147613-1
