= Böbingen an der Rems =

- Municipality
- Coat of arms

- Location of Böbingen an der Rems within Ostalbkreis district
- Interactive map of Böbingen an der Rems
- Location within Germany Location within Baden-Württemberg
- Coordinates: 48°49′19″N 09°55′09″E
- Country: Germany
- State: Baden-Württemberg
- Admin. region: Stuttgart
- District: Ostalbkreis

Government
  - Mayor (2019–27): Jürgen Stempfle

Area
  - Total: 12.22 km^{2} (4.72 sq mi)
- Elevation: 385 m (1,263 ft)

Population (2025-12-31)
  - Total: 4,523
  - Density: 370.1/km^{2} (958.6/sq mi)
- Time zone: UTC+01:00 (CET)
  - Summer (DST): UTC+02:00 (CEST)
- Postal codes: 73560
- Dialling codes: 07173
- Vehicle registration: AA
- Website: www.boebingen.de

Böbingen an der Rems (German pronunciation: [ˈbøːbɪŋən ʔan deːɐ̯ ˈʁɛms], lit. 'Böbingen on the Rems') is a municipality in the German state of Baden-Württemberg, in Ostalbkreis district. It lies on the river Rems.

== History ==
=== Roman history ===
The Roman limes passes through Böbingen, and the historical name of the locality "Bürgle" (= small castle) indicates that the presence of a Roman fort in Unterböbingen had never been forgotten. In 1885/86 first archeological excavations were conducted by the retired Chief of Staff of the Württemberg Army, Major-General Eduard von Kallee. Based on military strategic considerations he identified Unterböbingen as a Roman castrum. In 1892 Major Heinrich Steimle examined this in more detail by excavations on behalf of the Empire-Limes-Commission. The Roman military thermal bath, which was also open to the civilian inhabitants of the village was placed outside of the fort and excavated in 1978 north of the fort on a high terrace on the ridge above Remstal.

The fort and surrounding remains of the Unterböbingen castrum are since 2005 part of the UNESCO World Heritage, as they are a section of the Upper-Rhaetian Limes.

=== Alemannic settlements and first written reference ===
Many historical artefacts have been found in excavations, such as Alemannic graves. These and the old Michael Church in Oberböbingen are references to subsequent settlements, after the Romans had given up this military out-post. The first written reference about the municipality Böbingen is from 1281. In a document of 30 November 1291 is mentioned that the Gotteszell monastery had bought a farm in "Bebingen".

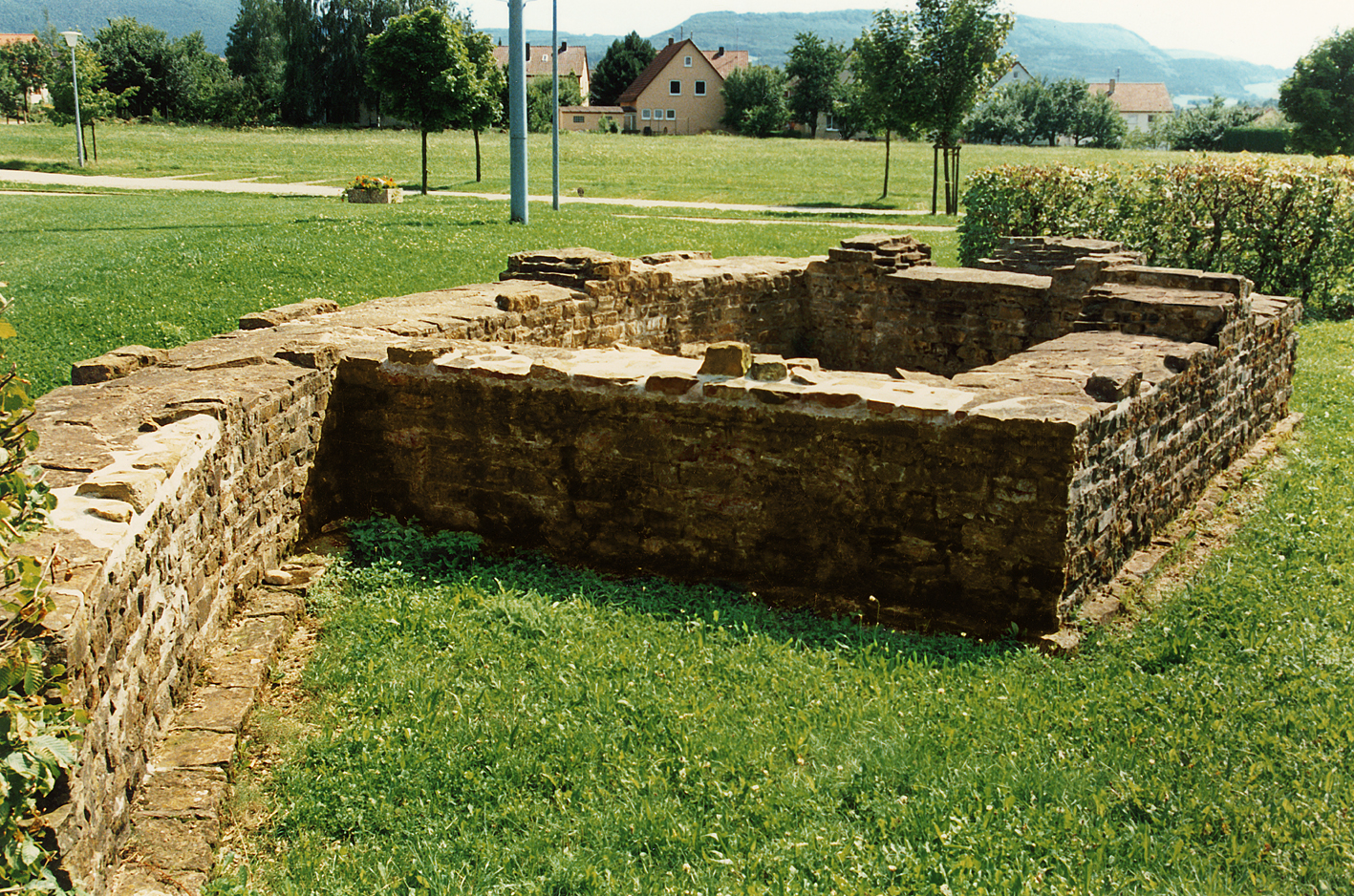
Tower at the south-east corner of the Roman castrum Unterböbingen, which has been found by General Eduard von Kallee based on his military experience

=== 18th–19th centuries ===
In the 19th century the inhabitants of Böbingen lived mainly from agriculture. The area belonged since 1818 to Oberamt Gmünd, later to district Schwäbisch Gmünd. Through the construction of the Stuttgart-Bad Cannstatt–Aalen railway Böbingen got a connection towards Aalen und Stuttgart.

=== 20th–21st centuries ===
In the 20th century the 4,4 kilometers long Böbingen-Heubach railway was built and opened in 1920. In 1938, the two communities Unterböbingen and Oberböbingen merged to form a community. After the Second World War many refugees settled in Böbingen. In 1973 the place came to the newly formed Ostalbkreis.
