= Robert Zahn =

German engineer and industrialist

- Born: March 23, 1861
- Died: January 21, 1921; Leipzig Hospital
- Burial place: Leipziger Südfriedhof
- Children: 4

Portrait of Robert Zahn

Robert Zahn (23 March 1861 in Münchberg– 21 January 1914 in Leipzig) was a German engineer and industrialist. Zahn started designing embroidery machines. As the director of the Vogtländische Maschinenfabrik (VOMAG) at a later stage, he played a major role in the technical perfection of the machines being produced there. The Plauen firm became one of the leading public limited companies in the engineering sector in Germany under his leadership.

== Life ==
Zahn was born as the son of Christian Karl Zahn and his wife Johanna Louise (née Jahreis). He attended school in Münchberg and later went to the vocational college in Hof, Bavaria. He started a course at the Technicum Mittweida in 1876, but did not complete his studies. He found work as a technician at the Stickmaschinenfabrik Kappel in 1882. He gained a fundamental knowledge of engineering there. However, he saw better opportunities for promotion at the Hilscher knitting and embroidery machine factory and moved to this company in 1894. Working with Max Hilscher, he registered his first two German patents in 1895. But he had already moved to Plauen to work at the Vogtländische Maschinenfabrik (VOMAG) in the following year. Following a three-year period in what was the world’s largest automated embroidery factory, Feldmühle AG in Rorschach in Switzerland, he returned to Plauen in 1900. VOMAG gave the gifted design engineer the creative freedom to boost his successful career. In 1904, when Zahn was already the deputy director of VOMAG, the supervisory board appointed him as the sole managing director. His many business trips not only generated orders, but also provided inspiration for improvements to VOMAG machines. Under his leadership, the company continued to expand its embroidery machines and web-fed printing press divisions.

Zahn was married to Luise Seidel in his first marriage. This marriage was dissolved in 1913. He then married his long-standing friend Paula Grabner in December in London. The two relationships produced four children: Hans, Friedrich, Walter and Erna. Zahn died very unexpectedly after an operation on his intestines in a Leipzig hospital on 21 January 1914. He was buried at the Leipziger Südfriedhof.

== Achievements ==
As a result of his work as a design engineer at the Kappel embroidery machine factory, Zahn was familiar with the technology of a shuttle embroidery machine operating according to the system introduced by Isaac Gröbli. During his time in Switzerland, he had got to know the further development work to produce automatic embroidery machines with a jacquard loom mechanism, which were controlled using a punched tape. At that time, the automatic machines were made in line with the patents of J. Arnold Gröbli, a son of Isaak Gröbli and brother of the mathematician Walter Gröbli, by Kursheedt Manufacturing Co. in the USA for the automated embroidery factory in Rorschach. As Zahn had successfully worked on optimising the Gröbli automatic embroidery machines in Switzerland, an exclusive licensing deal was signed between Feldmühle AG in Rorschach and VOMAG in Plauen in 1900 to manufacture automatic embroidery machines. This marked the start of the Plauen engineering company’s rise to become the world’s largest producer of embroidery machines.

At Zahn’s suggestion and in line with his outline sketches, a design team improved the Gröbli automatic machines with an associated embroidery punch machine in 1908. After the expiry of existing patents and licenses, VOMAG supplied a technically advanced automatic embroidery machine, which had been developed in-house, starting in 1910. The machine was marketed very successfully as the “Zahn system” and 2,000 of these machines were sold around the world in just 3 years. As an engineer, manager and director of VOMAG from 1904 onwards, Zahn had a major influence on the future direction of the Vogtland engineering company. Under his leadership, the firm perfected the construction of rotary printing press, a process started in 1899. VOMAG equipped the B.Z. am Mittag tabloid newspaper with what were the largest and fastest rotary printing presses at that time in 1908. The company presented the world’s first web-fed offset printing press. in 1912. The company also considered making trucks, but this only started in 1915.

== Honours ==
Münchberg honoured its important son with an information board on the house of his birth in 2015. The city of Plauen has named a street after Robert Zahn. The Embroidery Machine Museum, Plauen, also promotes the memory of Robert Zahn. There is still a working model that uses Zahn system there.
