= Gustav Hartenstein =

German philosopher and author

Gustav Hartenstein (18 March 1808 – 2 February 1890) was a German philosopher and author. He was one of the most gifted followers of Johann Friedrich Herbart.

== Biography ==
He was born at Plauen, Saxony, and educated at the Fürstenschule in Grimma. From 1826 he studied at the University of Leipzig, where his teachers were Karl Gottfried Wilhelm Theile, Heinrich Gottlieb Tzschirner, Christian Wilhelm Niedner, Gottfried Hermann, Wilhelm Traugott Krug and Wilhelm Wachsmuth. In 1833 he obtained his habilitation for philosophy with the thesis De Archytae Tarentini fragmentis philosophicis, and in 1836 was named a full professor at the University of Leipzig. In 1848/49 he served as academic rector.

He died in Jena.

== Works ==
He extended Herbart's thinking in the works entitled:

- Die Probleme und Grundlehren der allgemeinen Metaphysik (1836)
- Die Grundbegriffe der ethischen Wissenschaften (1844)

Also, he was the author of a 12–volume edition of Herbart's works, titled Johann Friedrich Herbart's sämmtliche werke (1850–52). In 1867 he published an edition of Immanuel Kant's collected works; Immanuel Kant's sämmtliche Werke (8 volumes).
