= Tauchnitz publishers =

German printing and publishing family company

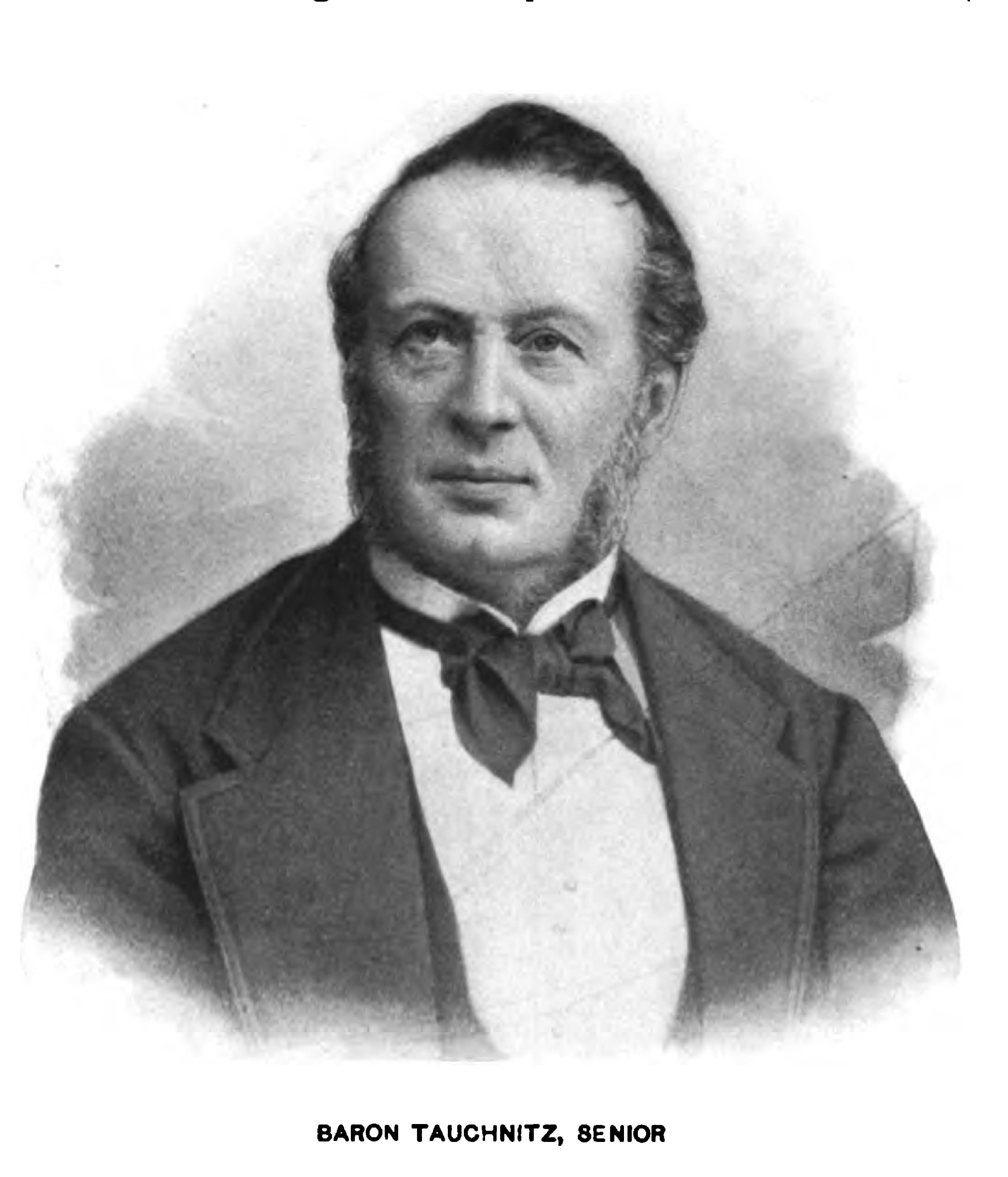
Christian Bernhard von Tauchnitz

Tauchnitz was the name of a family of German printers and publishers. They published English language literature for distribution on the European continent outside Great Britain, including initial serial publications of novels by Charles Dickens. Though copyright protection did not exist between nations in the 19th century, Tauchnitz paid the authors for the works they published, and agreed to limit their sales of English-language books to the European continent, as authors like Dickens or Bulwer-Lytton had separate arrangements for publication and sale in Great Britain.

== Carl Christoph Traugott Tauchnitz ==
Carl Christoph Traugott Tauchnitz (1761–1836), born at Grossbardau near Grimma, Saxony, established a printing business in Leipzig in 1796 and a publishing house in 1798. He specialized in the publication of dictionaries, Bibles, and stereotyped editions of the Greek and Roman classics. He was the first publisher to introduce stereotyping into Germany.

The business was carried on by his son, Carl Christian Philipp Tauchnitz (1798–1884), until 1865, when the business was sold to O. Holtze. He left large sums to the city of Leipzig for philanthropic purposes.

== Founding of Bernhard Tauchnitz ==
Christian Bernhard, Freiherr von Tauchnitz (25 August 1816, Schleinitz, present day Unterkaka – 11 August 1895, Leipzig), the founder of the firm of Bernhard Tauchnitz, was the nephew of Carl Christoph Traugott Tauchnitz. Christian's father died when he was young and his uncle played an important part in his development. His printing and publishing firm was started at Leipzig (Germany) on 1 February 1837.

Bernhard started the Collection of British and American Authors in 1841, a reprint series familiar to anglophone travellers on the continent of Europe. These inexpensive paperbound editions, a direct precursor to mass-market paperbacks, were begun in 1841, and eventually ran to over 5,000 volumes. In 1868 he began the Collection of German Authors, followed in 1886 by the Students' Tauchnitz Editions.

=== Early copyright reformer ===
In the early 1900s, a journalist writing about the company suggested that the warning on the covers of Tauchnitz's English-language books, "Not to be introduced into England or into any British colony," might lead some to believe that the books were not legitimate. In fact the books were authorised by the authors or their representatives for Continental sale only. The authors were paid royalties even at a time when no copyright protection for English and American books existed in Germany. That was Baron Tauchnitz's policy from the foundation of his company. He wrote in his original prospectus:

"Allow me to remark that I, as well as any other publisher in Germany, have at present the right to embark in such undertakings without any permission from the authors; and that my propositions arise solely from a wish thereby to take the first step towards a literary relationship between England and Germany, and towards an extension of the rights of copyright, and to publish my editions in accordance with those rights."

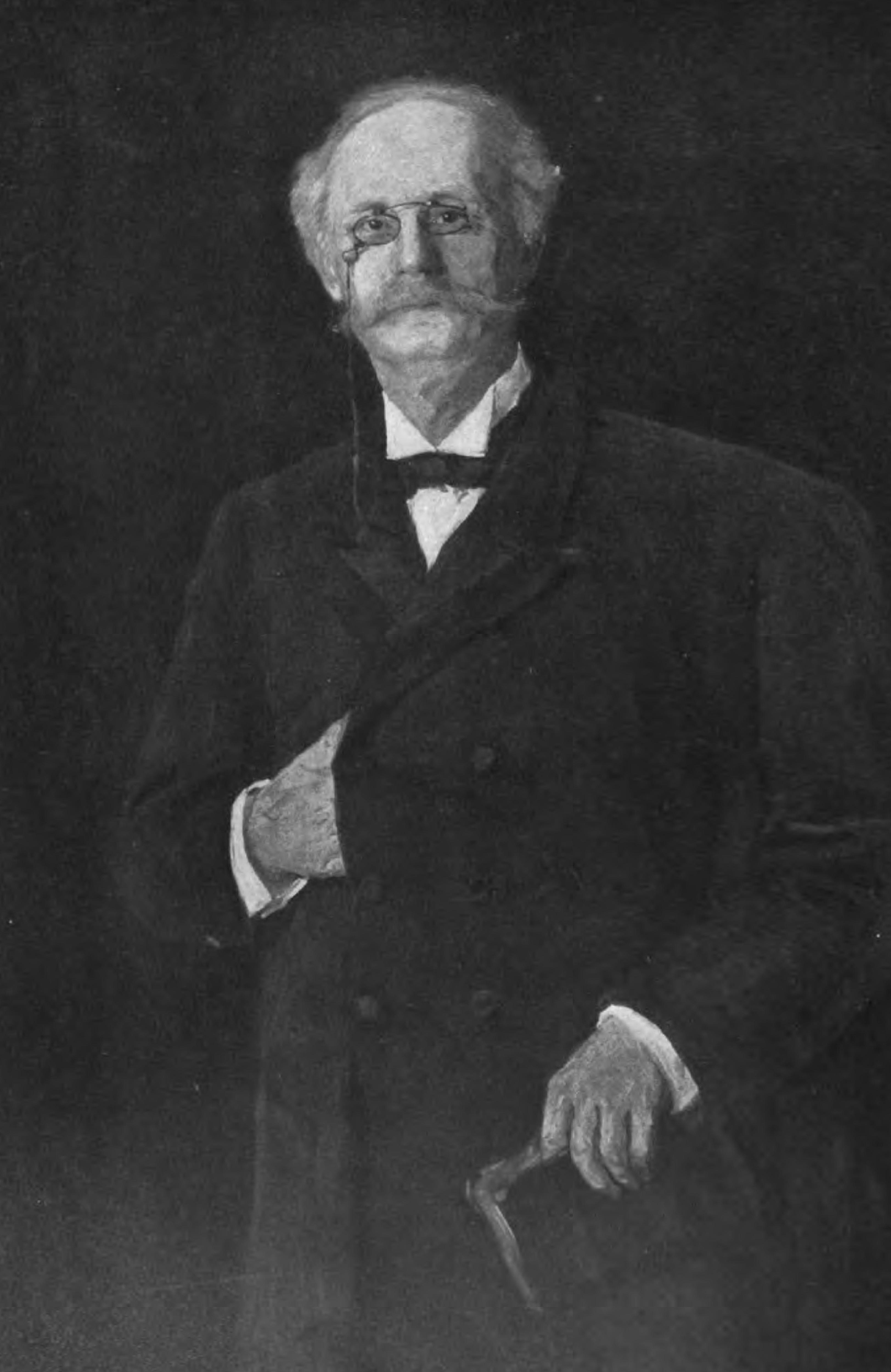
Christian Karl Bernhard Tauchnitz. from a portrait by Vilma Lwoff-Parlaghy

In 1841, when Tauchnitz started his English-language editions, there were no copyright treaties between England or the United States and Continental countries. Although Tauchnitz's editions were authorised, they were not protected from copyright infringement and he could offer no such protection to the authors he paid. A few years later, various Continental States formed copyright treaties with Britain: Prussia and Saxony in 1846, France in 1852, and successively nearly all European states. In these countries, the Tauchnitz Authorised Edition became the Copyright Edition. Finally, the Berne Convention of 1886 conferred copyright upon authors in its fullest form over the greater part of the developed world. Tauchnitz editions were the only authorised editions of works by American authors on the Continent of Europe until 1891, when, by the Copyright Treaty with the United States of America, they too became copyright editions.

=== Honours bestowed ===
In 1860 he was ennobled with the title of Freiherr (Baron) for his services to literature, and in 1877 was made a life member of the Saxon Upper Chamber. From 1866 to 1895 he was British consul-general for the kingdom and duchies of Saxony.

== Christian Karl Bernhard ==
Christian Bernhard was succeeded in the business by his son, Baron Christian Karl Bernhard Tauchnitz (born 29 May 1841). Christian Karl received his education at the Fürstenschule in Meissen, studied law at the Universities of Berlin, Zürich and Leipzig, and was a Doctor of Jurisprudence, and had passed the state examination by the age of twenty-one. He made a tour of Europe, stayed some time in England, and learned to speak and write English with barely a flaw. In 1866, he entered into partnership with his father at his firm.

== Catalogue ==
Two Tauchnitz books from the 1930s. The last line on the cover reads: Not to be introduced into the British Empire or U.S.A. (Details)

The two authors who first attracted Tauchnitz's attention were Dickens and Lytton with the novels Pickwick Papers and Pelham, which appeared in 1841. Twenty-two years later, in 1863, the five-hundredth title of the series was published under the title Five Centuries of the English Language and Literature. In 1869, an English-language edition of The New Testament, exhibiting the differences between the original Alexandrine, Sinaitic and Vatican manuscripts, was the one-thousandth title. It was dedicated by the Baron "To my English and American Authors, as a Token of Esteem for the Living, and a Tribute of Remembrance to the Dead." In 1881, the two-thousandth title, Of English Literature in the Reign of Victoria by Henry Morley was issued, in which facsimiles of the signatures of all the authors who had been published in the Tauchnitz series appeared. By 1901, 3,500 books had been published.

It was not only a catalogue of English works. German and French works filled a large space, as well as the Greek and Latin classics, which had been a speciality of his uncle Karl. His German edition of the Bible was a scholarly work. It included contributions from important German scholars including, Karl Gottfried Wilhelm Theile, Seligman Baer, Franz Delitzsch, Constantin von Tischendorf and Oscar von Gebhardt, together with the Bibliotheca Patrum. Scientific works, books on jurisprudence, and dictionaries covering most of the world's major languages, filled the catalogue as well.

The publishers amassed a huge amount of correspondence from authors of the day, which amounted to an important Who's Who of the time. Letters of thanks and dedications from many authors were in the Tauchnitz archive. These included letters from Harrison Ainsworth, Wilkie Collins, Maria Susanna Cummins, Louisa M. Alcott, the Countess of Blessington, Baron Lytton, Dinah Craik, Thomas Carlyle, Charles Dickens, Benjamin Disraeli, Gladstone, Thomas Babington Macaulay, George Henry Lewes, George Eliot, Nathaniel Hawthorne, Washington Irving, Longfellow, Elizabeth Gaskell, Charles Lever, Thackeray, Charles Reade, Tennyson, Robert Browning, Gerald Du Maurier, James Payn and Robert Louis Stevenson. From 1934 until 1951, Tauchnitz Editions and the Albatros Press, a competing English-language paperback series founded in 1932, were closely linked, and Max Christian Wegner played a role in both companies.

== The Todd-Bowden Collection of Tauchnitz Editions ==
The Todd-Bowden Collection is an important collection of Tauchnitz editions in the British Library. It was acquired in 1992, with the aid of the German KulturStiftung der Länder and the National Heritage Memorial Fund. The collection includes approximately 6,700 volumes, together with sale catalogues, leaflets, and other advertising material, and is one of the most important collections of Tauchnitz books outside Germany.
