= Hertenstein =

Hertenstein may refer to:

- Hertenstein, Lucerne, a village part of the municipality of Weggis, Canton of Lucerne, Switzerland
  - Hertensteiner Programm
- Hertenstein, Aargau, a village in the municipality of Obersiggenthal, Canton of Aargau, Switzerland
- Ruine Hertenstein, the ruin of a castle at Sigmaringen, Germany
- Hertenstein Castle, the ruin of a castle near Blaufelden, Germany

== People with the surname ==
- Wilhelm Hertenstein (1825-1888), member of the Swiss Federal Council (1879-1888)

== See also ==
- Hartenstein (disambiguation)
