= George A. Tice =

American photographer (1938–2025)

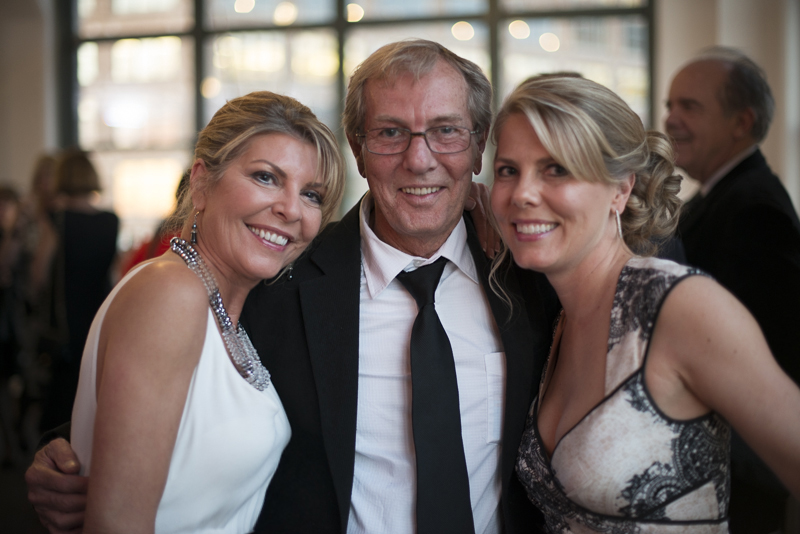
- George Tice with his assistants, his daughters Lisa and Jennifer Tice, 2013
- Born: October 13, 1938; Newark, New Jersey, US
- Died: January 16, 2025 (aged 86); Middletown Township, New Jersey, U.S.
- Known for: Photography
- Spouses: Joanna Blaylock (m. 1958; div. 1960); Marie Tremmel (m. 1960; div. 1977); Galina Kirlenco (m. 1984–1986)
- Children: 4

George Andrew Tice (October 13, 1938 – January 16, 2025) was an American photographer. His work depicts a broad range of American life, landscape, and urban environment, mostly photographed in his native New Jersey. He lived all his life in New Jersey, except for his service in the U.S. Navy, a brief period in California, a fellowship in the United Kingdom, and summer workshops in Maine, where he taught at the Maine Photographic Workshops, now the Maine Media Workshops.

Tice's work is held in the collections of the Art Institute of Chicago, Center for Creative Photography, J. Paul Getty Museum, Metropolitan Museum of Art, Museum of Modern Art, San Francisco Museum of Modern Art, and Whitney Museum.

== Early life and entry into photography ==
George A. Tice was born in Newark, New Jersey, on October 13, 1938, the son of insurance underwriter William S. Tice and Margaret Robertson, a Traveller of Irish, Scottish, and Welsh ancestry with a fourth grade education. In 1663, Tice's Belgian ancestors settled in Brooklyn and their firstborn son, Peter Tyson, moved to Monmouth County, New Jersey, in 1709, making Tice a tenth-generation New Jerseyan. Though George was raised by his mother, he regularly visited his father for advice until William's death when George was 19.

His first contact with photography was in the albums of family photographs belonging to his father, which gave him the desire to create images of his own. He began with a Kodak Brownie. In 1953, having bought a Kodak Pony, which gave him some control over exposure and focus, and a Kodak developing kit, he began to advance his craft. He also joined the Carteret Camera Club. Tice's photographs of homeless men on the Bowery won second place in the black-and-white print competition. It was at this point that he decided to make photography his career.

In 1955, he attended the Newark Vocational and Technical High School, where he briefly studied commercial photography under Harve Wobbe. When he turned sixteen, he quit school and took a job as a darkroom assistant for Classic Photo, a portrait studio in Newark. He also worked as a stock boy at Kresge’s Department Store in Newark, then as an office boy in the circulation department of the Newark Evening News. It was at this job that he learned about the death of the actor James Dean through a clipping about his death. Tice later adopted Dean as one of his subjects in Hometowns: An American Pilgrimage.

In 1956, Tice enlisted in the United States Navy. Despite scoring well on an IQ test, Tice was denied admission to the Navy's photography school and assigned to work as a messenger because he had not graduated high school. However, Tice ultimately convinced a superior officer to transfer him into a Photographer's Mate Third Class. After boot camp and two years at Naval Air Station Memphis, he was transferred to sea duty aboard the aircraft carrier, USS Wasp. One of the photographs he made on board, Explosion Aboard the U.S.S. Wasp, 1959, was published on the front page of The New York Times. Edward Steichen, then Director of Photography at the Museum of Modern Art, was struck by the image and requested a print for the museum's collection. That same year, Tice received an honorable discharge.

== Early career ==
In 1960, now a civilian, Tice joined the Vailsburg Camera Club and took a job as a family portrait photographer for Americana Portraits. As an active member of the club, he exhibited in international salons. That same year, he began to make short trips to Lancaster County, Pennsylvania, to photograph the Amish and Mennonite communities, using 35mm and medium format cameras. In 1964, he began his series of tree photographs and ended his association with the Vailsburg Camera Club, believing that he had learned all he could from its members. Tice had his first solo exhibition at the Underground Gallery in New York City and then moved with his family to California, where he pursued artistic projects like his series on the ghost town of Bodie, California, on the edge of the Sierra Nevada range.

Only six months after moving to Irvington, California, Tice moved his family back to New Jersey due to his wife's homesickness and his dissatisfaction with the lower pay for portrait photography. In 1967 he bought a 4 x 5 Deardorff view camera and made studies of ice formations. In the same year he traded in his 4 x 5 for an 8 x 10 view camera and began his aquatic plant series. He also produced his first photographs of Paterson, New Jersey, which became the subject of two books and exhibitions, Paterson and Paterson II. The following year he published The Amish Portfolio, a set of twelve, limited-edition prints with an introduction by Jacob Deschin. With his advance from Doubleday for Fields of Peace he bought a brand new 8 x 10 Deardorff, which remained his preferred instrument.

== Maturity ==
In 1968, Tice met Lee Witkin, and they combined their knowledge of the history of photography to establish the Witkin Gallery in New York. That year, Tice issued the portfolio Trees, taught a workshop in Aspen, Colorado, and began to experiment with platinum printing, a lost art since World War I when wartime platinum prices forced manufacturers of the special printing paper out of business. Since William Willis' patents insufficiently described the paper used for printing, Tice reinvented the process and detailed his efforts in a 1970 issue of the British photography journal Album. In 1972, Tice continued to experiment with early photographic processes by printing a photogenic drawing of leaves in a contact frame exposed to sunlight onto hand-sensitized paper coated with diluted silver nitrate, resembling Henry Fox Talbot's Calotype negatives.

In 1970, Doubleday published Tice's first book, Fields of Peace: A Pennsylvania German Album, with text by Millen Brand. That year, he photographed coastal Maine, taught at The New School for Social Research, and traveled to London and Paris with Lee Witkin. Together, they met with Frederick H. Evans' son, who sold them a block of platinum prints and lantern slides for the Witkin Gallery.

George A. Tice, "Car for Sale" (1969)

In 1971, Tice issued his portfolio, Bodie, with an introduction by Lee Witkin, printed an Evans portfolio from lantern slides, and published, again with Doubleday, Goodbye River Goodbye, with poetry by George Mendoza. In 1972 Life magazine sent him on assignment for the article "Home to Iowa." Rutgers University Press published Paterson, and the Metropolitan Museum of Art presented a solo exhibition, Paterson, New Jersey. Doubleday published Seacoast Maine: People and Places, with a text by Martin Dibner.

Tice received fellowships from the National Endowment for the Arts and the Guggenheim Foundation. Paterson was awarded the Grand Prix du Festival d'Arles. In the last year of his life, Edward Steichen appointed Tice as printer of his negatives, a role which Tice fulfilled until 1998 by printing several portfolios of Steichen's work. Tice also made prints of photographs by Frederick H. Evans, Francis Bruguière, and Edward Weston, which were issued by the Witkin Gallery. In 1975, the Witkin Gallery presented a twenty-year retrospective of Tice's work accompanied by the book George A. Tice, Photographs: 1953–1973, which was published by the Rutgers University Press.

Ansel Adams recommended Tice for a commission by the Field Museum of Natural History to make a pair of 60-foot (18 m) murals of Sapelo Island. Life sent Tice to Hutchinson, Kansas, to contribute to its special report "One Day in the Life of America."

Around 1976/77, Tice acquired a Fujica soft-focus lens, which he used over the next two years for a series of photographs of a girlfriend, Deborah, and three white cats, one of which belonged to his daughters. Whereas modern photographers treated soft focus as a flaw producing cloudy glows, Tice praised the effect as one lost along the history of photography.

Urban Landscapes: A New Jersey Portrait followed in 1976, again from the Rutgers University Press, an expansion of Tice's vision of the gritty cities of industrial New Jersey. As in Paterson, Tice explored scenes of the working man's environment that survived only precariously at the time, soon to disappear forever. Although his subject-matter, technique, and style extend far beyond that, almost to the point of universality, the urban scene of New Jersey remained his most familiar vein.

In 1977, Tice produced Artie Van Blarcum: An Extended Portrait, documenting the life of a Tri-County Camera Club member. When Tice decided to create a book about him, Blarcum reluctantly allowed Tice to watch his daily life. Blarcum, then 52, was presented as a New Jersey everyman who was a third-generation factory worker sharing his family home with his brother. Tice used Blarcum's amateur photography to critique art that intends to suit the tastes of competition judges by perfecting one's technique on banal subject matter. After Blarcum's death, Tice presented his archives to William Paterson University, which exhibited them from September 8 – October 16, 2015.

== Later career ==
After reading Carl Sandburg's biographies of Abraham Lincoln in 1981 and coming across the Lincoln Motel & Abe's Disco in Newark, New Jersey, Tice began a series cataloging physical depictions of Lincoln across the United States, ranging from the grand Lincoln Memorial to simpler murals in Lincoln, Illinois. In 1984, Rutgers University Press published this series of photographs.

In 1982 Tice printed a portfolio of Edward Steichen's work, Steichen: Twenty-Five Photographs, and another retrospective monograph, Urban Romantic: The Photographs of George Tice, issued by the publisher David R. Godine, marking the beginning of Tice's attempt to equal the quality of his original prints in his books. In 1983, he traveled to the Midwest to photograph the hometowns of legendary American men: James Dean's Fairmount, Indiana, Ronald Reagan's Dixon, Illinois, and Mark Twain's Hannibal, Missouri. In this series, Tice aimed to capture both the social fabric that supported their rise and the remembrances of their lives.

Tice also regularly taught photography classes at numerous institutions including Parson's School of Design in NYC, the Maine Photographic Workshop in Rockport, Maine, and Appalachian Photographic Workshops in Asheville, NC.

The following year, Tice and Cole Weston led a group of American photographers on a cultural exchange program to the Soviet Union. Tice printed a second Steichen portfolio, In the Studio, 12 photographs. In 1985, Evelyne Daitz took over Lee Witkin's gallery in the wake of his death, running it until 1999. Further Steichen portfolios appeared in 1986, Juxtapositions, 12 photographs, and 1987, The Blue Sky, 12 photographs. Tice was inducted into the New Jersey Literary Hall of Fame and awarded the "Michael," a prize designed by Michael Graves. Hometowns: An American Pilgrimage, was published by New York Graphic Society in 1988.

In 1990, Tice received a joint fellowship from the National Museum of Photography, Film, and Television (now the National Science and Media Museum) and Ilkley College. The following year, they published the work he did as a fellow, Stone Walls, Grey Skies: A Vision of Yorkshire, consisting of moody, atmospheric views of the countryside and coast. An expanded second edition of the book was published in 1993.

George A. Tice, Oak Tree, Holmdel, NJ (1970)

In 1992, Tice extensively studied his family history. Whereas his father, William S. Tice, believed that the family came from 19th-century German immigrants, George Tice found that his ancestors arrived on the ship Rosetree in 1663 from Liège, Belgium, and settled in modern-day Brooklyn. In 1709, Peter Tyson, moved to Monmouth County, New Jersey, founding an area that became known as Ticetown as the family's last name shifted. In 1848, Jacob S. Tice built a homestead that was home to four generations of George Tice's ancestors in a family of farmers and boatmen. By the time the house was rediscovered, it was dilapidated and fully collapsed in 2005. In 2007, Lodima Press published George Tice's photographs taken across the areas his ancestors had lived.

Tice spent 1994 photographing urban landscapes across New Jersey, which he published eight years later as George Tice: Urban Landscapes.

From 1997-1998, Tice printed more of Edward Steichen's negatives for his widow Joanna's book, Steichen's Legacy, and made two maquettes of Steichen's unfinished project, Shadblow, The Final Apprenticeship of Edward Steichen. Tice received a New Jersey State Council on the Arts Fellowship. His revised and expanded edition of Fields of Peace: A Pennsylvania German Album, was published by Godine in 1998. Godine published George Tice: Selected Photographs, 1953–1999, a pocket-sized retrospective. His work was shown in American Photographs 1900/2000, Part 3, 1968–1999 at the James Danziger Gallery in New York City.

In 2000, Tice had his first showing at the Ariel Meyerowitz Gallery. He then began photography for Paterson II. The following year, Godine published a pocket-sized retrospective book with the same title as the show. In 2002, W. W. Norton published George Tice: Urban Landscapes with introduction by Brian Wallis, accompanied by an exhibition of the same title at the International Center of Photography. The show traveled to the New Jersey State Museum, University of Maine's Museum of Art, and Point Light Gallery in Sydney, Australia.

In 2004, there were further shows at the Candace Perich Gallery in New York and the Zelda Cheatle Gallery in London. That year, Tice traveled to London, Yorkshire, and Belgium, where he oversaw the production of Common Mementoes, a collection of previously unpublished urban landscapes from the 1990s. Five of his photographs were adapted for scenic drops and rear projections for the Broadway musical, Jersey Boys. Tice had an exhibition at the Scott Nichols Gallery in San Francisco, and he resumed work on the Tice genealogy and photography of Ticetown.

In 2006, Tice traveled to Belgium to work with Georges Charlier of Amanasalto for the production of Paterson II. He supervised printing of a special edition of 20 x 24 platinum/palladium prints by Salto. Paterson II was published by Quantuck Lane Press with an essay by A. D. Coleman, "The Poetics of the Quotidian: George Tice's Paterson Photographs." A related exhibition, Paterson II: Photographs by George Tice, opened at the Newark Museum, continuing on to Lambert's Castle, Paterson, the Jordan Schnitzer Museum of Art, at the University of Oregon at Eugene.

Tice contributed to the group show at the J. Paul Getty Museum, Where We Live, Photographs of America, from the Berman Collection. He then began to work on an inventory of his archive. In 2009 David R. Godine published Seacoast Maine, with an introduction by John K. Hanson. This was accompanied by an exhibition at the Peter Fetterman Gallery, Santa Monica.

In 2010, New Street Productions filmed the documentary George Tice: Seeing Beyond the Moment, which premiered in 2013 at The Newark Museum of Art as part of Tice's 75th birthday celebrations. That year, the movie was also shown at William Paterson University, Scott Nichols Gallery, Nailya Alexander Gallery, and Point Light Gallery.

In October 2015, the Lucie Foundation honored Tice with their Lucie Award for Lifetime Achievement at Carnegie Hall. In 2022, a book of Tice's photographs titled, Lifework: Photographs 1953–2013, was published by Veritas Editions.

A resident of Middletown Township, New Jersey, Tice died there from complications of chronic obstructive pulmonary disease on January 16, 2025, at the age of 86.

== Personal life ==
Tice married Joanna Blaylock in 1958, while he was serving in the U.S. Navy. A son, Christopher, was born. They divorced in 1960, following his discharge from the Navy. He met and married Marie Tremmel the same year. They had four daughters: Loretta, Lisa, Lynn, and Jennifer. Tice and Marie Tremmel were divorced in 1977. Between 1984 and 1986 he was married to Galina Kirlenco, of Russian descent.

== Awards ==
- 1964: Awarded Frank Roy Fraprie Medal in the 32nd International Photographic Exhibition of the Boston Camera Club
- 1973: National Endowment for the Arts Fellowship; Guggenheim Fellowship; Grand Prix du Festival d'Arles
- 1987: Inducted into New Jersey Literary Hall of Fame, receiving award designed by Michael Graves
- 1990: Joint fellowship from National Museum of Photography, Film, and Television and Bradford and Ilkley College, Bradford, UK
- 1998: New Jersey State Council on the Arts Fellowship
- 2003: New Jersey State Council for the Humanities Honor Book for Urban Landscapes
- 2003: Honorary Doctorate from William Paterson University
- 2015: Lucie Award for Lifetime Achievement

== Publications ==
- Fields of Peace: A Pennsylvania German Album. New York: Doubleday, 1970. With an essay by Millen Brand. Rev. ed.: New York: Dutton, 1973. Rev. ed.: Boston: David R. Godine, 1998.
- Goodbye, River, Goodbye. New York: Doubleday, 1971. Poetry by George Mendoza.
- Paterson. New Brunswick, New Jersey: Rutgers University Press, 1972. Statement by Tice.
- Seacoast Maine: People and Places. New York: Doubleday, 1973. With an essay by Martin Dibner.
  - Boston: Godine, 2009. With an introduction by John K. Hanson
  - Boston: Godine, 2015. ISBN 9781567925104.
- George A. Tice: Photographs, 1953–1973. New Brunswick, New Jersey: Rutgers University Press, 1975. With an introduction by Lee D. Witkin.
- Urban Landscapes: A New Jersey Portrait. New Brunswick, New Jersey: Rutgers University Press, 1975. Statement by Tice.
- Artie Van Blarcum: An Extended Portrait.. Danbury, New Hampshire: Addison House, 1977. With an introduction by Tice and an afterword by Robert Coles.
- Urban Romantic: The Photographs of George Tice. Boston: David R. Godine, 1982. With an introduction by Tice.
- Lincoln. New Brunswick, New Jersey: Rutgers University Press, 1984. With an introduction by Tice.
- Hometowns: An American Pilgrimage. Boston: A New York Graphic Society Book, Little Brown & Co., 1988. With an introduction by Tice.
- Stone Walls • Grey Skies: A Vision of Yorkshire. Bradford, UK: National Museum of Photography, Film & Television, 1990. With a foreword by Tice and an afterword by Juliet R. V. Barker. Expanded ed.: Bradford, UK: National Museum of Photography, Film & Television, 1992. With a foreword by Tice and an afterword by Juliet R. V. Barker.
- George Tice: Selected Photographs, 1953–1999. Boston: David R. Godine, 2001. With a foreword by David R. Godine.
- George Tice: Urban Landscapes. New York: International Center of Photography in Association with W.W. Norton, 2002. With a preface by Tice and an introduction by Brian Wallis.
- Common Mementos. Revere, Pennsylvania: Lodima, 2005. Statement by Tice.
- Paterson II. Quantuck Lane, New York, 2006. With a foreword by Mary Sue Sweeney Price, a preface by Tice and an introduction by A.D. Coleman.
- Ticetown. Revere, Pennsylvania: Lodima, 2007. Essay by Tice.
- Seldom Seen. Exton, Pennsylvania: Brilliant, 2013. With essays By Michael More and August Kleinzahler.
- Lifework: Photographs 1953–2013. Woodinville, Washington: Veritas, 2021. With an essay by Michael Miller and an afterword by Tice.

== Exhibitions ==
Aside from a permanent collection of 13 photographic prints in the New York Museum of Modern Art, Tice's work has also been shown in the following exhibitions:

- Paterson, New Jersey, Metropolitan Museum of Art, New York, 1972.
- Urban Landscapes: A New Jersey Portrait, at Rutgers University Art Gallery, 1976.
- Liberty State Park: The Master Plan, Museum of Modern Art, New York City (organized by MoMA's Department of Architecture), 1979.
- George A. Tice, Photographic Museum of Finland, Helsinki, Finland, 1985.
- Main Street to Red Square, Drew University, Madison, New Jersey, 1985.
- Stone Walls, Grey Skies and A Retrospective, National Museum of Photography, Film & Television, Bradford, UK, 1991
- Urban Landscapes, International Center of Photography, New York, 2002.
- George Tice: Urban Landscapes, An American Master, New Jersey State Museum, Trenton, New Jersey, Museum of Art, University of Maine, Bangor, 2003.
- George Tice: Paterson, Newark Museum, 2006.
- Paterson II: George Tice, William Paterson University, Wayne, New Jersey, 2007.
- A to Z: 26 Great Photographs From the Norton Collection, Norton Museum of Art, West Palm Beach, 2013.
- Seeing Beyond the Moment The Photographic Legacy and Gifts of George Tice, Newark Museum, 2013.
- Without Adornment: Photographs by George Tice, September 9 through December 13, 2013, William Paterson University Galleries, 2013.

== Filmography ==
- Honoree George Tice, Lucie Foundation
- George Tice: Seeing Beyond the Moment, 2013, a documentary written and directed by Bruce Wodder, Peter Bosco, and Douglas Underdahl, High Bridge, NJ, New Street Films.

== Collections ==
Tice's work is held in the following permanent collections:

- Art Institute of Chicago, Chicago, IL: 34 prints
- Center for Creative Photography, University of Arizona, Tucson, Arizona (personal and professional records detailing Tice's work and life)
- J. Paul Getty Museum, Los Angeles, CA: 16 prints
- Metropolitan Museum of Art, New York
- Museum of Modern Art, New York: 13 prints
- San Francisco Museum of Modern Art, San Francisco, CA: 66 prints
- Whitney Museum, New York: 10 prints (Stone Walls, Grey Skies, A Vision of Yorkshire)
