= Johann Daniel Ritter =

German historian

Johann Daniel Ritter (October 16, 1709 in Schlanz – May 15, 1775 in Wittenberg) was a German historian.

In 1732 he received his magister degree from the University of Leipzig, where in 1735 he became an associate professor of philosophy. In 1742 he was appointed professor of history at the University of Wittenberg.

From 1736 to 1745 he edited the Codex Theodosianus.

== Selected works ==
- De Fetialibus Populi Romani, Leipzig 1732 (dissertation).
- De Marcio primo Pontifice M. & Familia Marcia, Leipzig 1733
- Observationes Criticas complectens, Leipzig 1735
- Observationes historicae praemissae orationi aditiali, 1742.
- Historia praefecturae praetorianae ab origine dignitatis ad Constantinum M., 1745.

In 1780 Johann Matthias Schröckh published Ritter's "Aelteste Meisnische Geschichte bis auf Heinrich den Erlauchten" (The history of Meissen up to the time of Henry III).
