= Hartenstein =

Hartenstein may refer to:

- Hartenstein, Saxony, a town in Saxony, Germany
- Hartenstein, Bavaria, a municipality in Nürnberger Land, Bavaria, Germany
- Burg Hartenstein, a castle in Lower Austria, Austria
- Airborne Museum 'Hartenstein', in the Netherlands
- Hartenstein (surname)

== See also ==
- Hartenštejn, a castle in Bochov, the Czech Republic
- Hardenstein
- Hertenstein (disambiguation)
