= Manfred Feiler =

German painter (1925–2020)

- Born: 22 August 1925; Plauen, Weimar Republic
- Died: 15 March 2020 (aged 94)
- Occupations: Painter illustrator

Manfred Feiler (22 August 1925 – 15 March 2020) was a German painter and illustrator.

== Biography ==
Starting in 1939, Feiler studied at the Staatliche Kunstschule für Textilindustrie Plauen. He was granted a scholarship by the German regime, which allowed him to continue his studies. He was heavily influenced by his instructors, Kurt Geipel and Walther Löbering. Later that year, Feiler was sent to the Eastern Front, but he was struck by shrapnel in 1943, causing him to become paraplegic and leave the military service.

In 1948, Feiler unveiled his first exhibitions at the Fritz Geyer Gallery and the Luther House in Plauen. During this time, he worked as an advertiser for the Handelsorganisation. Additionally, he worked as a designer for textile companies in the Plauen area. However, his employment was terminated after he refused to paint pictures of political figures. In 1952, Feiler completely devoted himself to being an independent artist.

In 1961, Feiler exhibited abstract art paintings at the Fritz Geyer Gallery. The exhibition was strongly criticized by the press, and Feiler was portrayed as a "pro-Western dauber." He was accused of desecrating the culture of East Germany, and was banned from publicly displaying his art. He then turned to Otto Dix, another prominent painter who advocated for Feiler to return to painting. However, the regime did not budge, and Feiler resigned to continue his work in private. Nevertheless, he became one of the most important European painters of the 20th century.

After the fall of the Berlin Wall, Feiler began displaying his works in public again. His first exhibition was in Erfurt. Free from political pressure, he opened a new chapter in his art career. In 1998, he met the American artist Paul DeBruyne in Naples, Florida. In 2011, the Freedom Museum Washington purchased two of Feiler's paintings for its own collection.

Manfred Feiler died on 15 March 2020 at the age of 94.

== Awards ==
- Entry in the City of Oelsnitz Guest Book (2000)
- Medal of the City of Plauen (2001)
- Vogtland Honor Award (2010)
- Honorary Citizen of the City of Plauen (2011)
- Order of Merit of the Free State of Saxony (2012)
