= Juliane Pfeil =

German politician (born 1987)

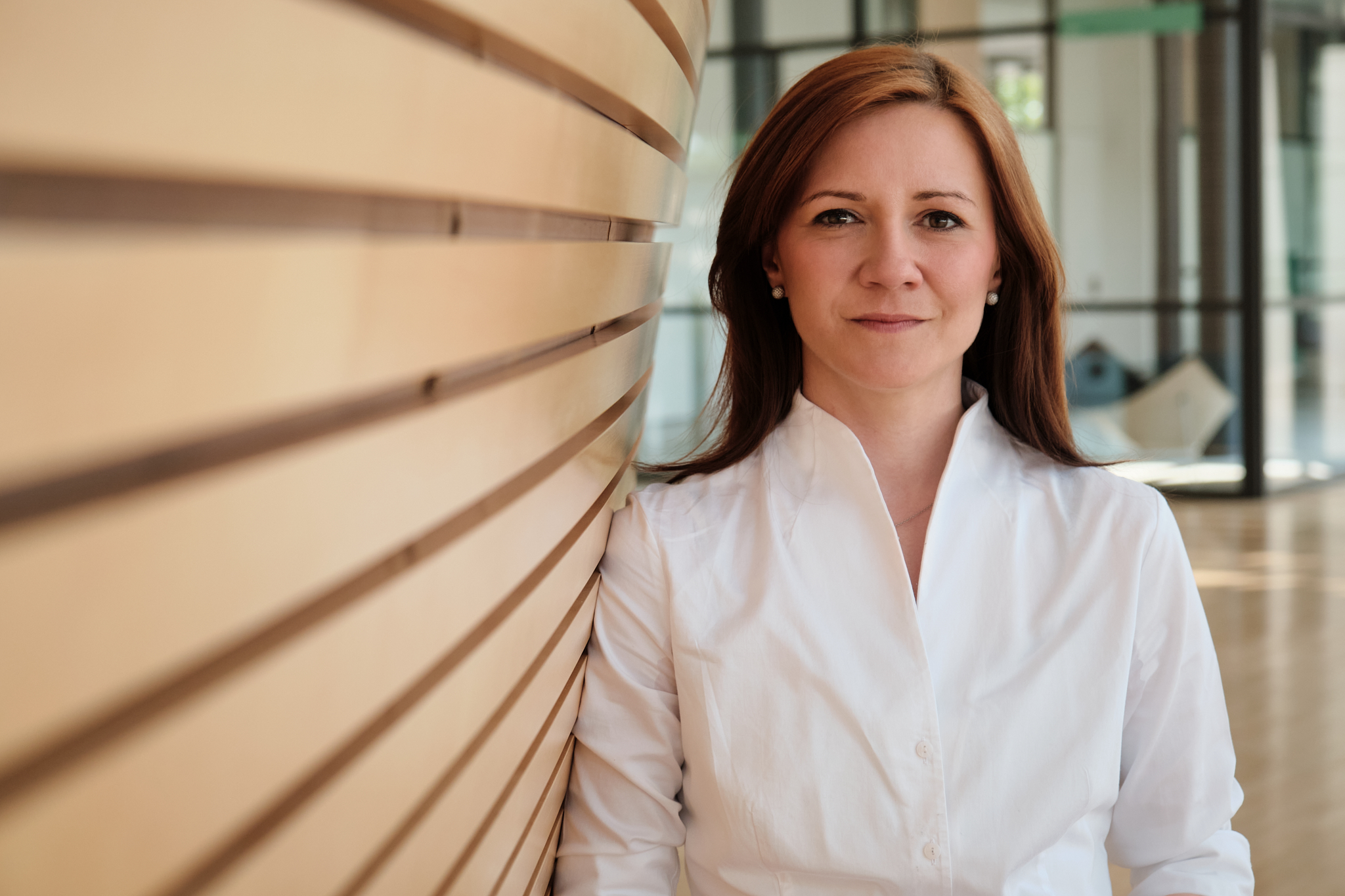
- Pfeil in 2022

Member of the Landtag of Saxony
- Incumbent
- Assumed office 16 November 2021
- Preceded by: Holger Mann
- In office 29 September 2014 – 1 October 2019

Personal details
- Born: 26 April 1987 (age 38) Plauen
- Party: Social Democratic Party (since 2003)

Juliane Pfeil (formerly Pfeil-Zabel; born 26 April 1987 in Plauen) is a German politician. She has been a member of the Landtag of Saxony since 2021, having previously served from 2014 to 2019. From 2009 to 2012, she served as chairwoman of Jusos in Saxony.
