= Karl Christoph Traugott Tauchnitz =

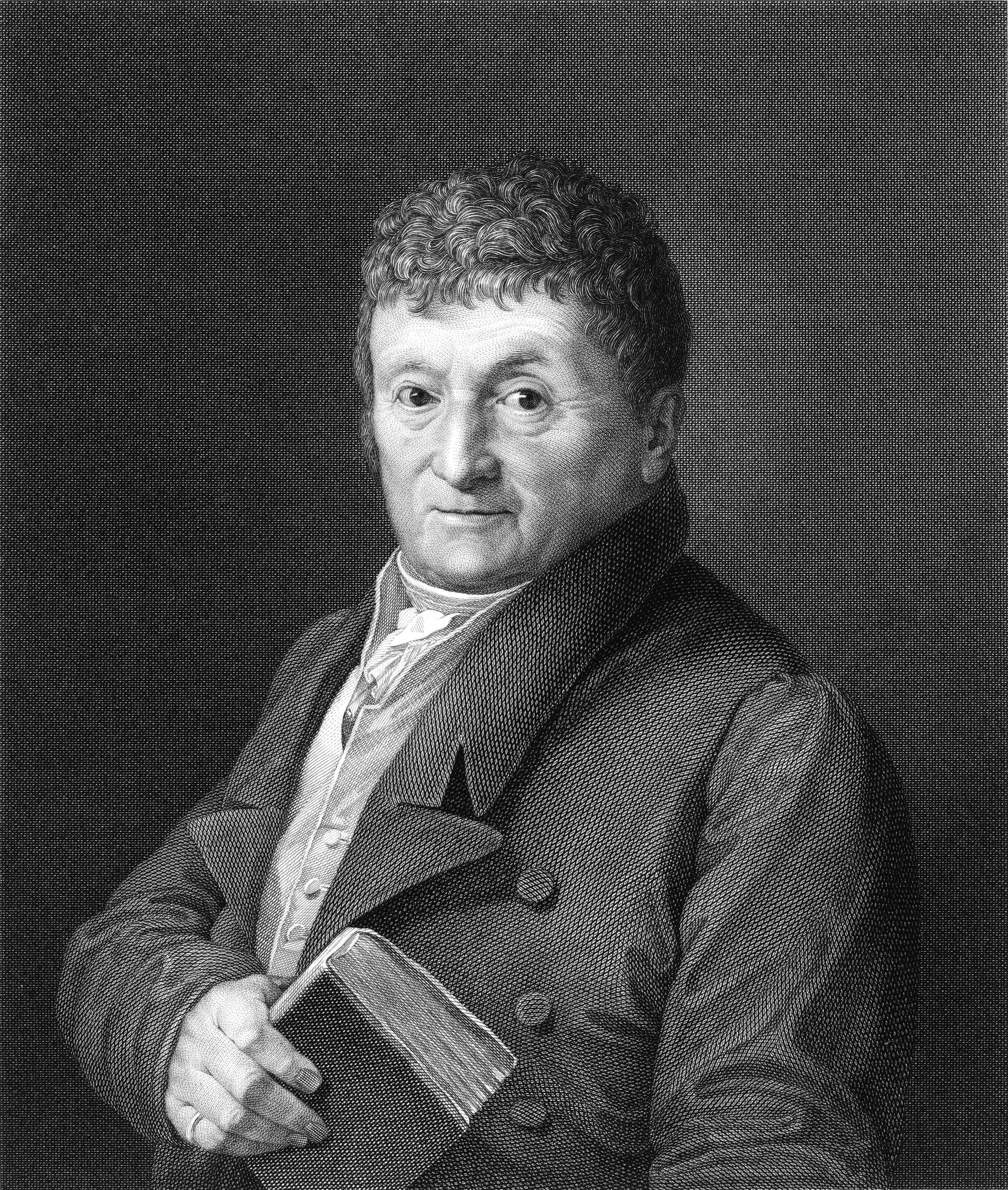

Karl Christoph Traugott Tauchnitz (29 October 1761 – 14 January 1836) was a German printer and bookseller. He was born at Grosspardau, near Grimma and Leipzig, Germany. He learned the printer's trade at Leipzig, and worked in the printing house of Unger in Berlin. In 1792 he entered the house of Sommer in Leipzig. He began a small printing business of his own in Leipzig in 1796. In 1798 he opened a bookstore in connection with the printing business, and in 1800 a type foundery. His business, “Karl Tauchnitz,” became one of the largest establishments of the kind in Germany.

In 1809 he began to issue Greek and Latin classics in accurate, convenient, and cheap editions, and they circulated throughout Europe. He also published fine editions of classical authors in folio. By offering a prize of a ducat for every error pointed out, he brought out a remarkably correct edition of Homer. In 1816 he introduced stereotyping into Germany and applied it to music, an experiment which had not been tried before. His edition of Mozart's Don Giovanni had a wide popularity. His stereotyped editions of the classics were once widely famed alike for their cheapness, their convenience, and their accuracy. He also printed stereotype editions of oriental works, including two of the Hebrew Bible, and an edition of the Koran.

By his will Leipzig received 4,500,000 marks for charitable ends. A son, Karl Christian Philipp Tauchnitz, carried on the business. A Tauchnitz edition of English authors, which numbered over 3,700 volumes, was begun in 1842 by a nephew, Christian Bernhard, Freiherr von Tauchnitz.

== See also ==
- Tauchnitz publishers
