= Christian Bernhard Tauchnitz =

German publisher (1816–1895)

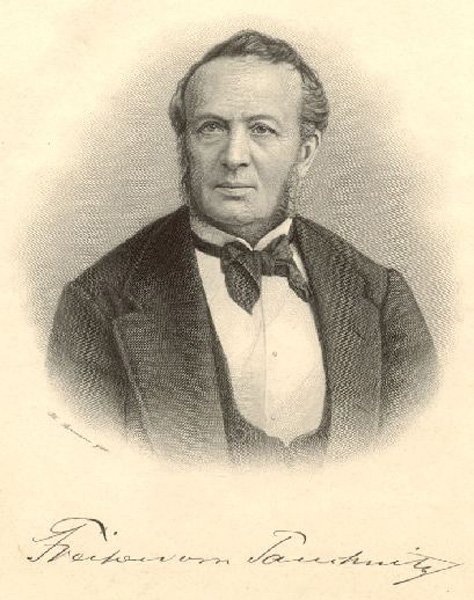

Christian Bernhard Tauchnitz (25 August 1816 – 13 August 1895) was a German publisher.

== Biography ==
He was born near Naumburg, a nephew of Karl Christoph Traugott Tauchnitz. His firm, founded in Leipzig in 1837, was noted for its accurate classical and biblical texts, its dictionaries, and other works of reference. In 1841, Tauchnitz began a Collection of British Authors, now extending to some 3500 volumes and widely read on the continent of Europe. English authors were paid a royalty by Tauchnitz, who thus helped to establish the present international copyright law. A similar collection of German Authors (translated into English) was begun in 1866 and Students' Tauchnitz Editions of English and American works began to appear in 1886 with notes and introductions in German. In 1860 the title of baron was conferred upon him by the duke of Saxe-Coburg-Gotha, and his title was recognized by the king of Saxony in 1861. Tauchnitz was made British Consul General for Saxony in 1872, and a member of the Saxon House of Peers in 1877.

== See also ==
- Tauchnitz publishers
