= Hertenstein Castle =

Ruined castle in Baden-Württemberg, Germany

- Blaufelden-Billingsbach
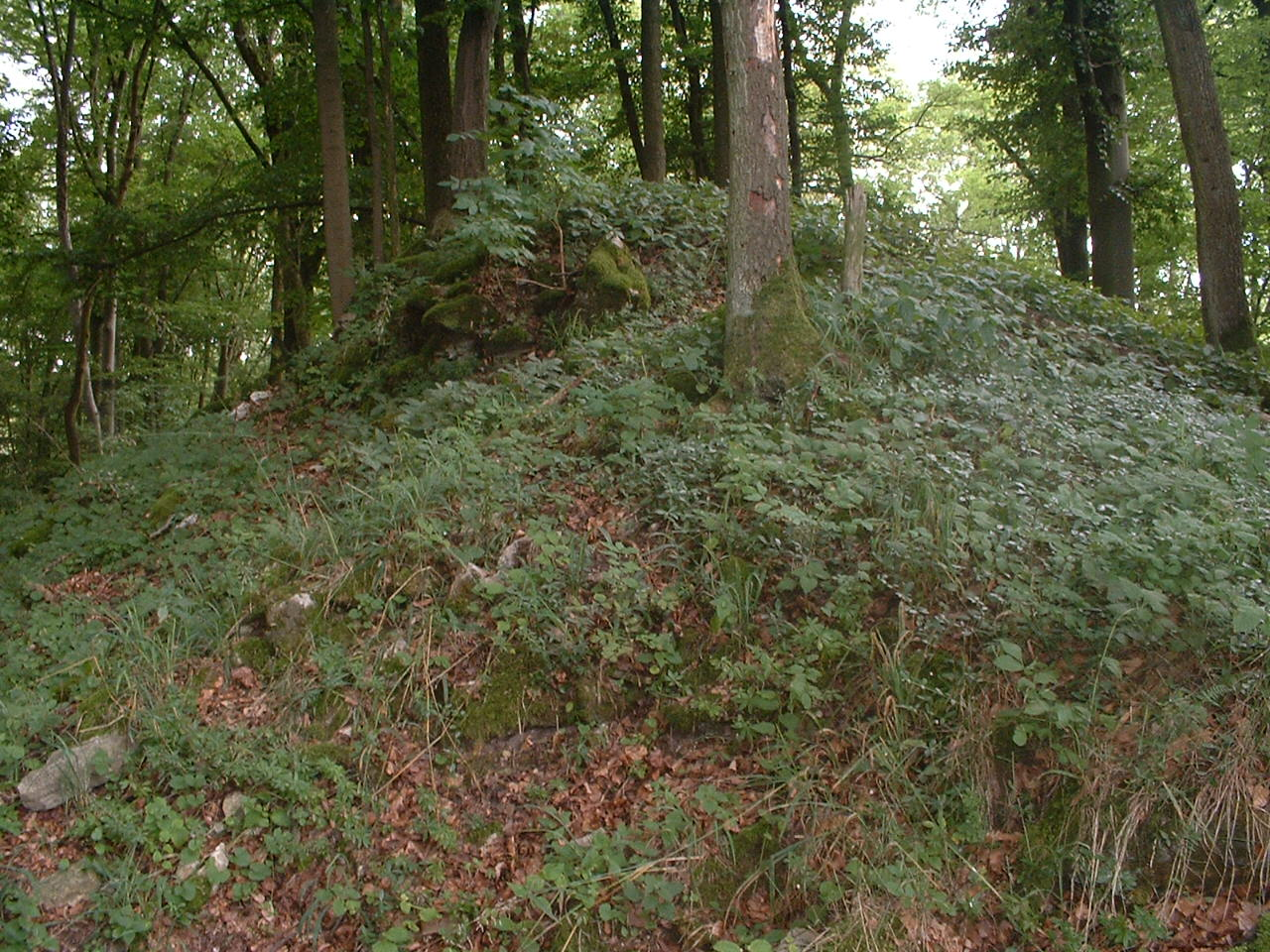
- Remains of the keep

Site information
- Type: Spur castle
- Code: DE-BW
- Condition: Ruin

Location
- Coordinates: 49.297879°N 9.888543°E
- Height: 442.8 m above sea level (NN)

Site history
- Built: Early 13th century
- Materials: Buckel stone

Garrison information
- Occupants: Ministerialis

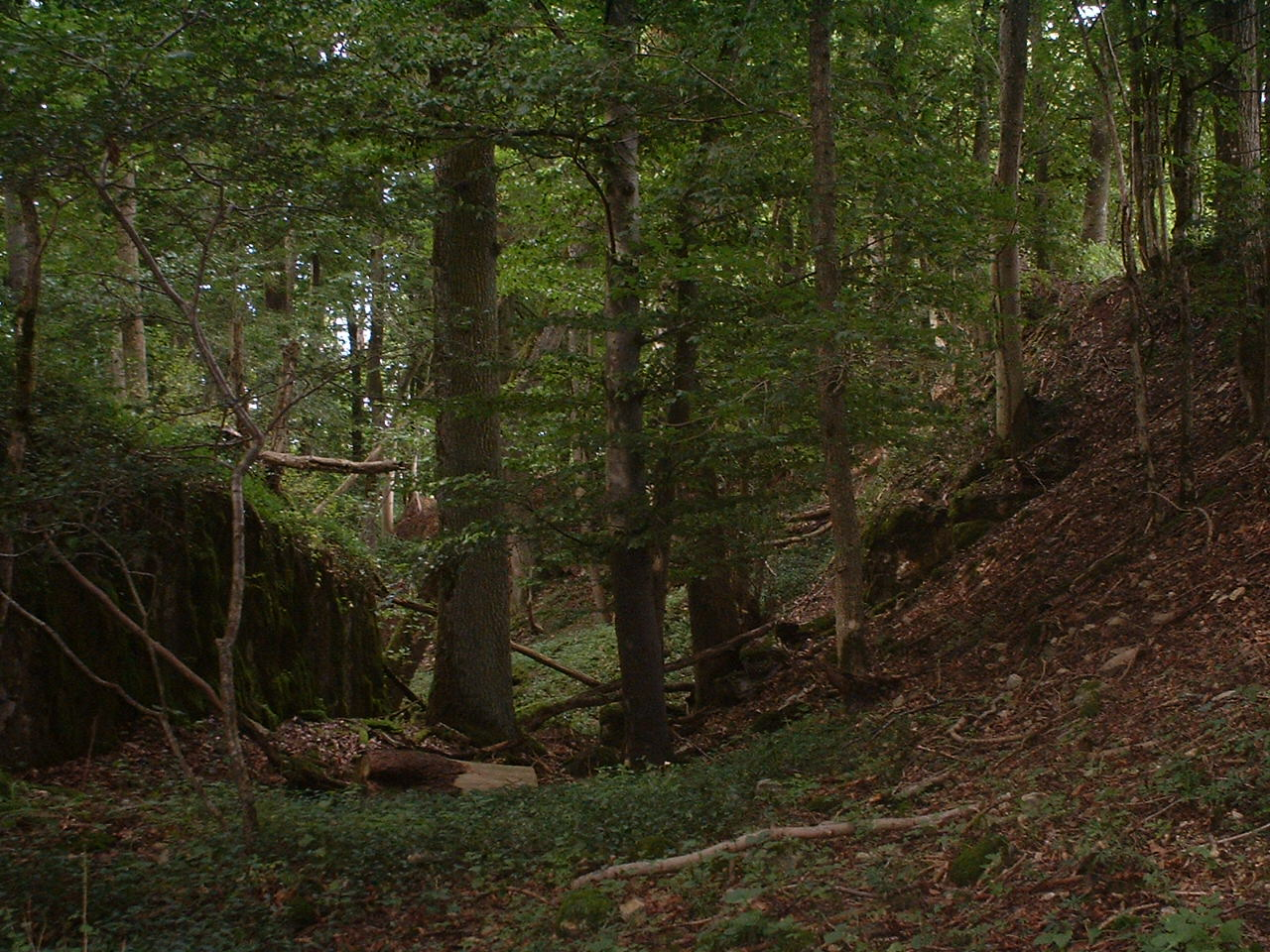
Hertenstein Castle, part of the moat

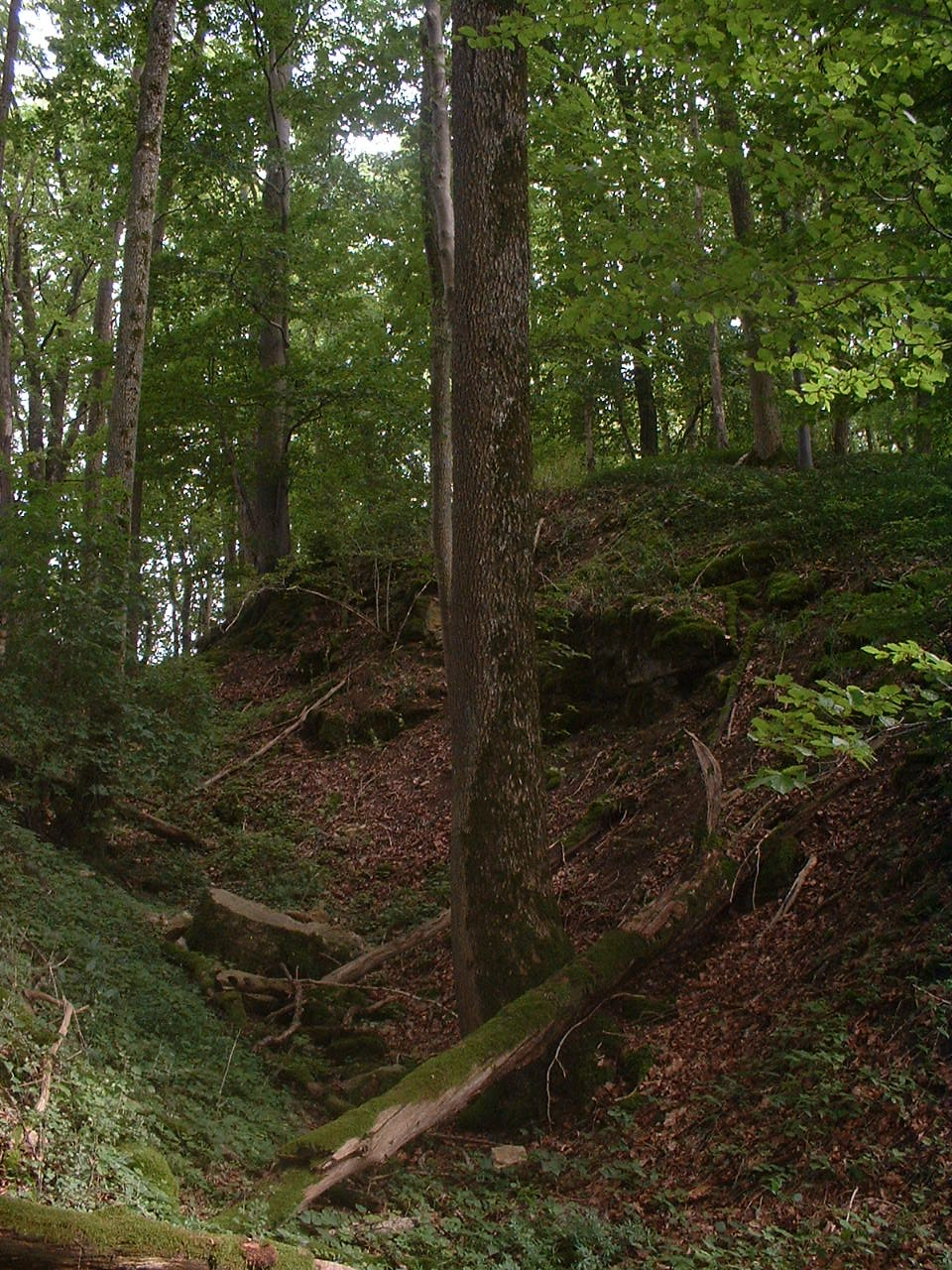
Hertenstein Castle, part of the moat

Hertenstein Castle is a ruined spur castle approximately 900 metres (3,000 feet) southwest of the village of Billingsbach, part of the municipality of Blaufelden, in the district of Schwäbisch Hall in the state of Baden-Württemberg, Germany.

== Description ==
The castle is located on a steep hill above the confluence of two streams (the Billingsbach and the Rötelbach) at an elevation of 442 metres (1,450 feet). The main approach of the castle to the northeast was protected by an 80-metre (260-foot) long artificial moat running from the steep slopes to the north towards the neighbouring hill in the south. The moat is between 5 and 6 metres (16 and 20 ft) deep. Out of the moat a mound rises which are the remains of the outer ward, followed by a drop of 3 to 4 metres (9.8 to 13.1 ft) towards the inner ward. Inside the inner ward is a flat triangular area about 32 metres (105 feet) long and 25 metres (82 feet) wide, in the middle of which the remains of the bergfried (keep) are found. All that is left of the keep is a mound rising up to 5 metres (16 feet) with a diameter of 8 metres (26 feet). The keep was built of rustication buckel stones (squared-off stones with a rounded outer surface).

Only the moat is clearly visible today as none of the castle's structures above ground have survived. The whole area is covered by dense woodland.

== History ==
The castle was built in the early 13th century. The original builders and owners of the castle are unknown. The existence of a castle is only documented as late as 1314 when a certain Eberhard von Hertenstein, lord of Billingsbach and vassal of the counts of Hohenlohe, appeared as a witness in a charter. The lords of Billingsbach seemed to have moved to the spur castle at the beginning of the 14th century. Yet, towards the end of the 14th century, after the extinction of the House of Billingsbach and the castle's return to the counts of Hohenlohe in 1370, the castle appeared to have lost its function as a dwelling place for the local nobility. On a map from 1578, the castle is indicated as being in a ruinous state.

== Function ==
A trading route leading from Künzelsau through the valley of the Jagst towards Schrozberg and Rothenburg ob der Tauber passed through Billingsbach, where it crossed two streams. One of the functions of Hertenstein Castle was to guard this crossing and to protect travellers.

== Excavation ==
In 1948 and 1950, excavations on a small scale revealed shards of ceramics and other artefacts from the medieval period as well as the 16th century, indicating that the castle was inhabited at least until the early modern period.

== See also ==
- List of castles in Baden-Württemberg
