= Evelyne Daitz =

Swiss-American photography dealer (1936–2019)

- Born: Eveline Iris Zoller; April 13, 1936; Dardagny, Geneva, Switzerland
- Died: October 31, 2019 (aged 83); New York City, New York, U.S.
- Occupation: Art dealer specializing in photography

Evelyne Z. Daitz (April 13, 1936 – October 31, 2019) was a Swiss-born American art dealer, curator, and agent, specializing in photography. She was the owner and director of the Witkin Gallery in New York from 1984 to 1999.

== Early life ==
Eveline Iris Zoller was born on April 13, 1936, in Dardagny, Switzerland, the daughter of Johann Zoller and Pauline Feller Zoller. Her father was a blacksmith, and her parents ran a gas station and shop. Eveline Zoller moved to the United States to work as an au pair. She became Eveline Daitz when she married Howard C. Daitz, a photography dealer, in 1962. When she became an American citizen in 1965, she began using the spelling "Evelyne" for her first name.

== Career ==
Daitz helped to run the Witkin Gallery, "the first commercially successful photographic gallery in New York City", with its founder, Lee D. Witkin, from 1976 until his death in 1984. Then she became owner and director of the Witkin Gallery for fifteen years, moving it from E. 57th Street to SoHo in 1985, and closing the gallery and bookstore in 1999. She chose photographers to feature in the gallery, promoting the works of Jill Freedman, Evelyn Hofer, Ruth Orkin, Marion Palfi, Burk Uzzle, and Jerry Uelsmann among many others.

In 1988 Daitz hosted a show of 64 new prints of photographs by Walter Ballhause, who documented life in Weimar Germany. Some of the gallery's shows under Daitz had unusual themes, such as "On the Elbow" (1993), fifty photographs of elbows, and "Sur la Tête" (1998), photographs of objects on human and animal heads, inspired by the work of Graciela Iturbide. "Sur la Tête" was described by the New York Times photography critic as "provocative, mysterious, whimsical, just plain beautiful, or a combination thereof." The gallery's last show, "Clothes Off" (1999), focused on photography and the nude subject, including works by Imogen Cunningham, Judy Dater, Manuel Álvarez Bravo, Edward Weston, Mário Cravo Neto, Arnold Eagle, and Willy Ronis.

In 1994 Daitz selected a portfolio of photographs, published in a limited edition to mark the Witkin Gallery's 25th anniversary. In 2000 she curated a show of Cuban photography at Cuban Art Space in New York. Daitz was also an artists' agent, representing photographers Manuel Álvarez Bravo, Wendell MacRae, and Colette Urbajtel. She was technical advisor to the Manuel Alvarez Bravo Foundation.

== Personal life ==
Eveline Zoller married Howard C. Daitz, a photography dealer, in 1962. Evelyne Z. Daitz died in 2019, aged 83 years, in New York City. The Witkin Gallery's papers, including artists' files, exhibition materials, and gallery records, are archived at the Center for Creative Photography in Tucson.
