= Oscar von Gebhardt =

German Lutheran theologian (1844-1906)

Oscar Leopold von Gebhardt (22 June 1844 – 9 May 1906) was a German Lutheran theologian, born in the Baltic German settlement of Wesenberg in the Russian Empire (now Rakvere, Estonia).

He studied theology at the Imperial University of Dorpat and at several other German universities, and afterwards worked in university libraries at Strasbourg, Leipzig, Halle and Göttingen. In 1891 he became director of the publication department at the Royal Library at Berlin, and in 1893 became chief librarian and professor of paleography at the University of Leipzig.

He specialized in the field of early Christian literature. He strongly believed in the independence of the librarian profession as an academic, but to be separate from the academic teaching profession.

He published Karl Gottfried Wilhelm Theile's "Novum Testamentum Graece" (1875–1900) and "Das Neue Testament griechisch und deutsch" (fourth edition, 1896); edited "The Miniatures of the Ashburnham Pentateuch" (1883); with Adolf von Harnack, "Texte und Untersuchungen zur Gerschichte der altchristlichen Literatur" (1882–1905), a multi-volume series devoted to New Testament and patristic criticism; and with Harnack and Theodor Zahn, an edition of the Apostolic Fathers (1875–78).

Gebhardt died in Leipzig.

== Works ==
- Oscar von Gebhardt, Die Evangelien des Matthaeus und des Marcus aus dem Codex purpureus Rossanensis. Leipzig: Hinrichs, 1883.
- As editor: Novum Testamentum Graece: recensionis Tischendorfianae ultimae textum cum tregellesiano et Westcottio-Hortiano contulit et brevi adnotatione critica additisque locis parallelis (3rd edition 1886; original author: Constantin von Tischendorf).
- Acta martyrum selecta: Ausgewählte Märtyreracten und andere Urkunden aus der Verfolgungszeit der christlichen Kirche, 1902 – Selected acts of martyrs and other documents from the period of persecution of the Christian church.
