= Hartenstein (surname) =

Hartenstein is a German surname. Notable people with the surname include:

- Chuck Hartenstein (1942–2021), former relief pitcher in Major League Baseball
- Gustav Hartenstein (1808–1890), German philosopher and author
- Isaiah Hartenstein (born 1998), German-American basketball player
- Eddy Hartenstein, American CEO of Tribune Company and Los Angeles Times
- Reiner Hartenstein, German computer pioneer
- Werner Hartenstein (1908–1943), U-boat captain involved in the Laconia incident

== See also ==
- Mike Hartenstine (born 1953), American football player
