= Plauen =

Town in Saxony, Germany

- Town
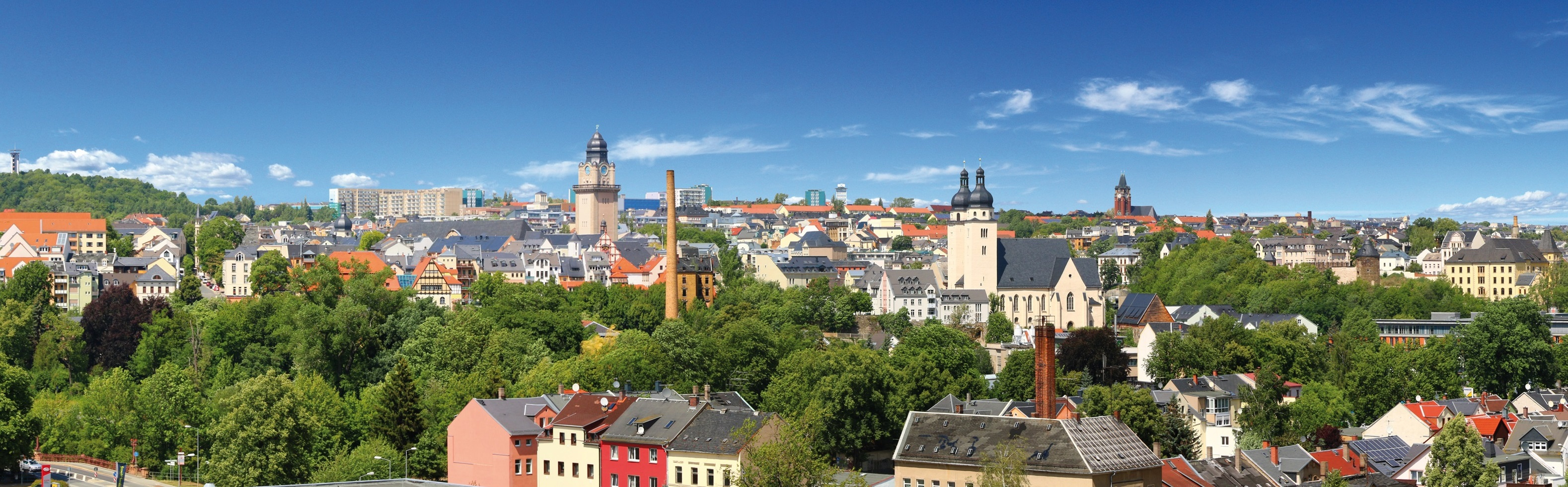
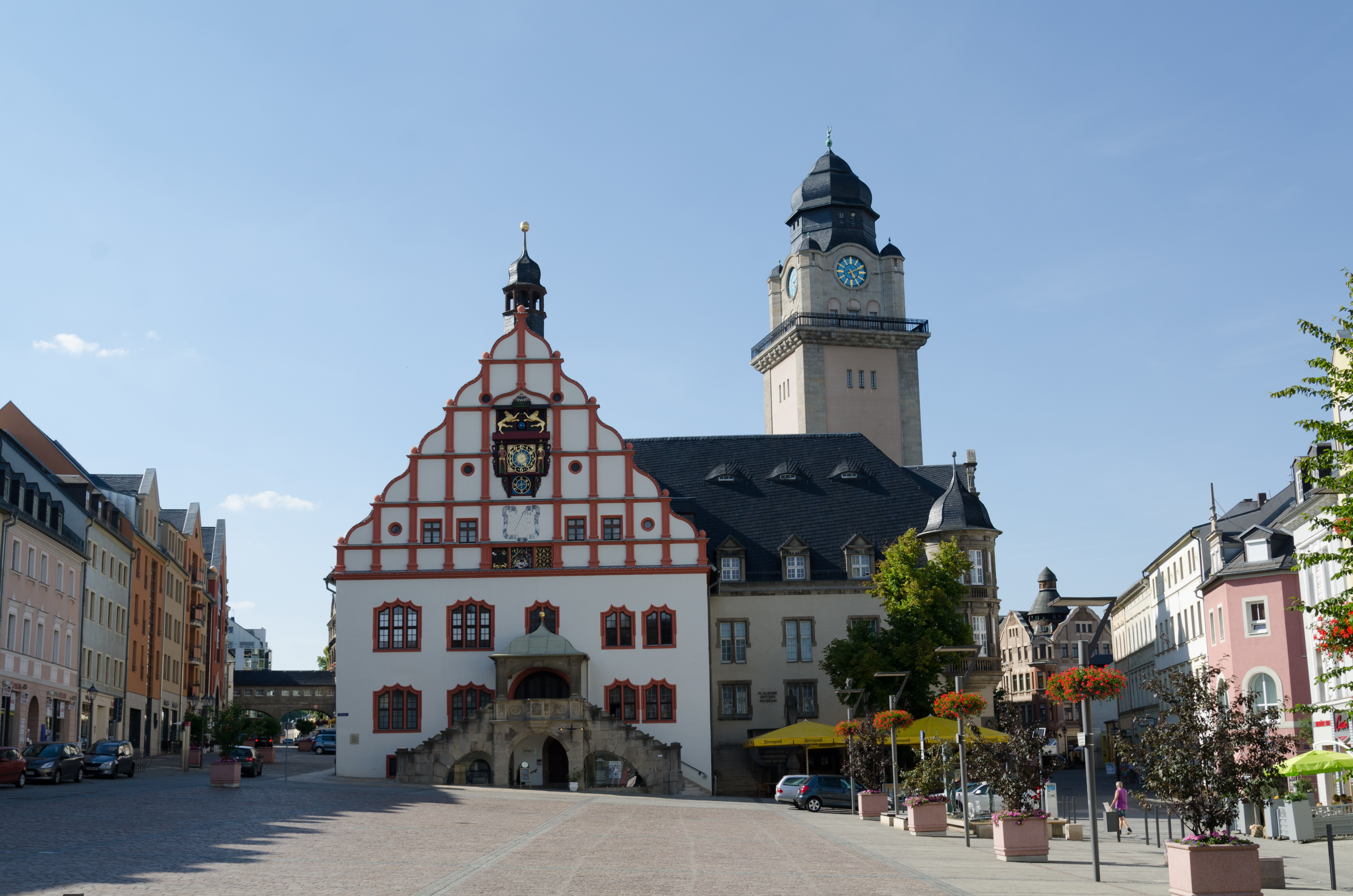
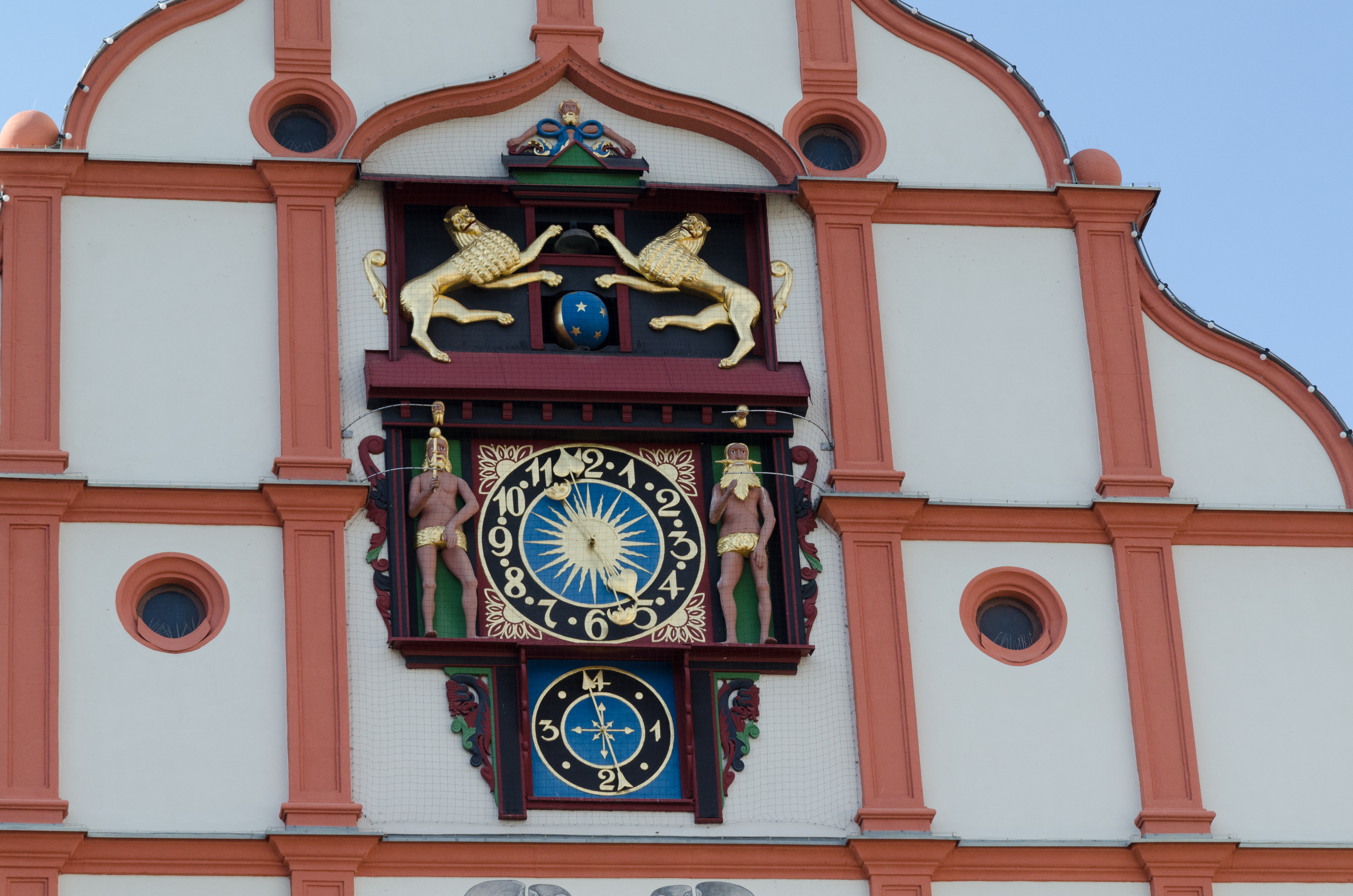
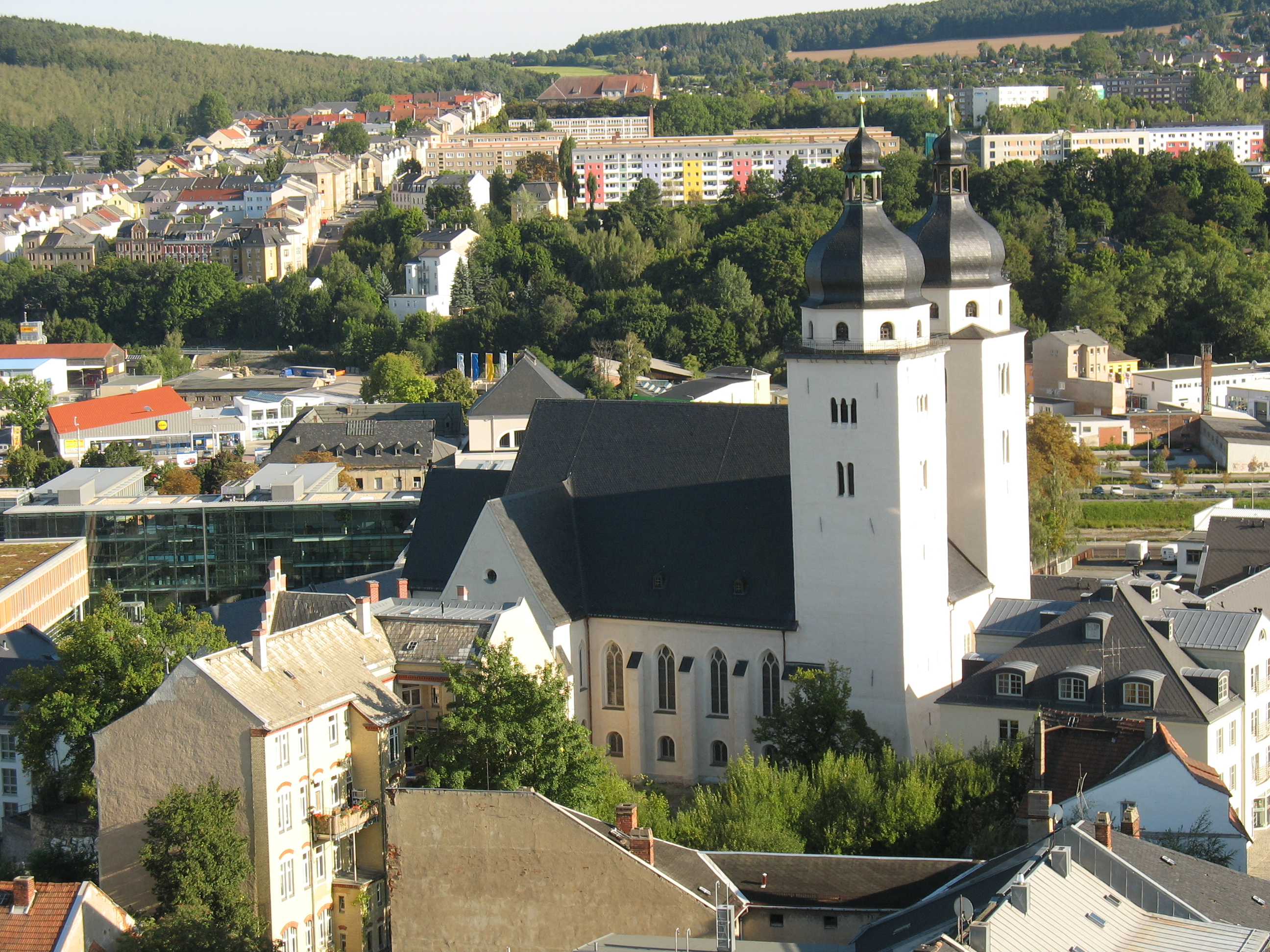
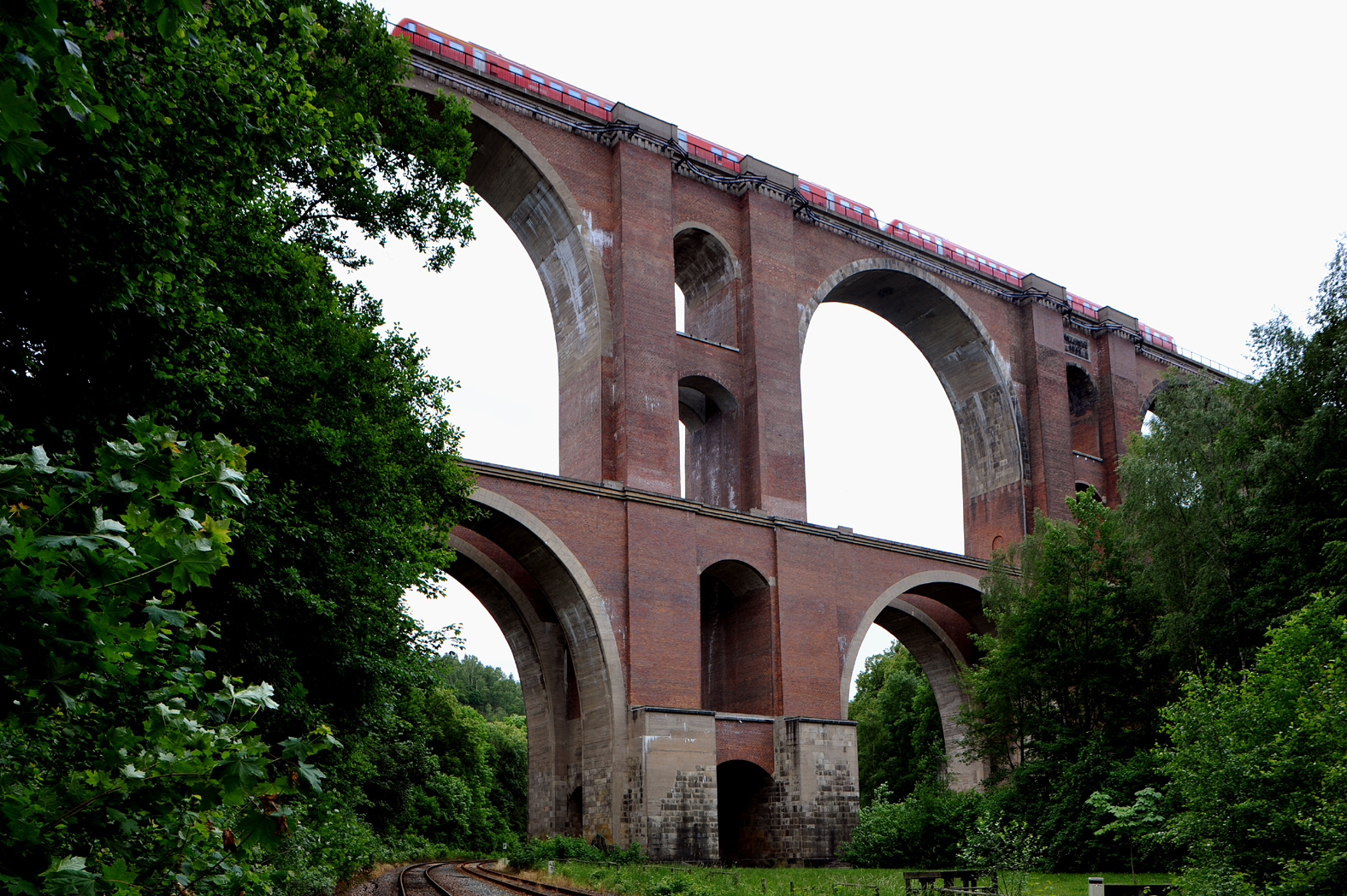
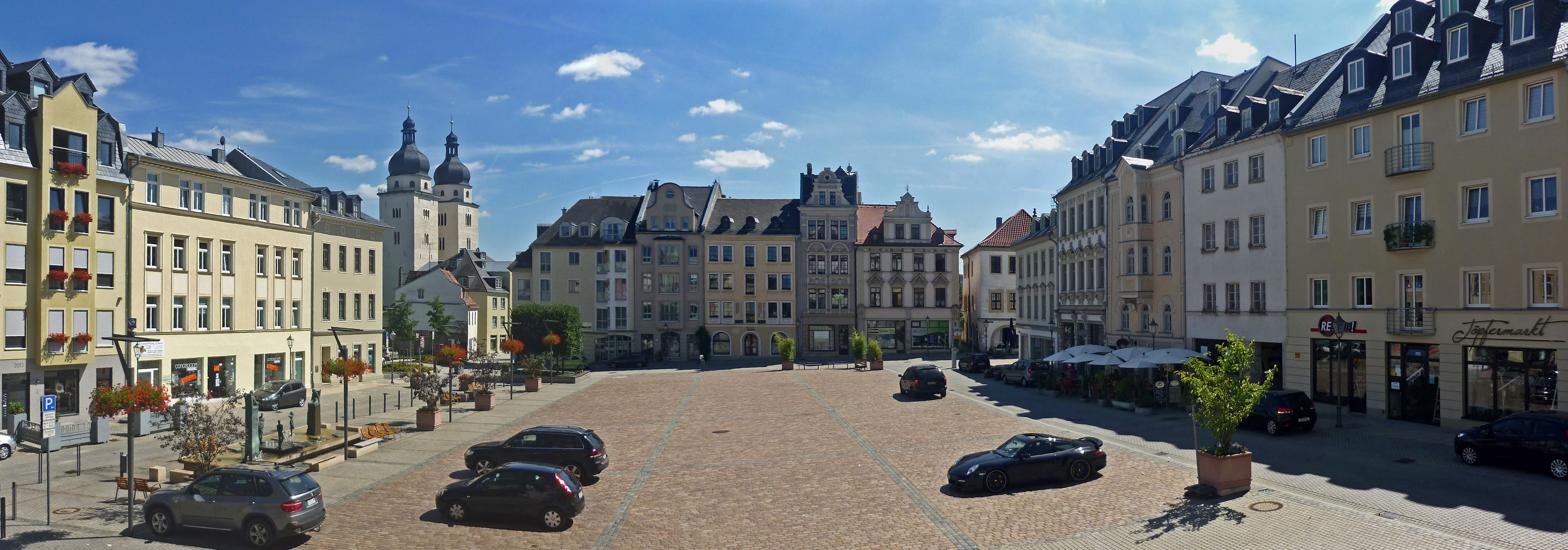
- View over the city centre Old and new city hall Astronomical clock of the city hall St John's Church Elster Viaduct Old market square

- Coat of arms

- Location of Plauen within Vogtlandkreis district
- Interactive map of Plauen
- Location within Germany Location within Saxony
- Coordinates: 50°29′N 12°07′E
- Country: Germany
- State: Saxony
- District: Vogtlandkreis
- Subdivisions: 5 city boroughs with 38 parts

Government
  - Mayor (2021–28): Steffen Zenner (CDU)

Area
  - Total: 102.11 km^{2} (39.42 sq mi)
- Elevation: 412 m (1,352 ft)

Population (2025-12-31)
  - Total: 64,893
  - Density: 635.52/km^{2} (1,646.0/sq mi)
- Time zone: UTC+01:00 (CET)
  - Summer (DST): UTC+02:00 (CEST)
- Postal codes: 08523;-5;-7;-9
- Dialling codes: 03741
- Vehicle registration: V, AE, OVL, PL, RC
- Website: www.plauen.de

Plauen (German pronunciation: [ˈplaʊən] PLOW-en; Upper Sorbian: Pławno; Czech: Plavno) is a town in Saxony, Germany with a population of around 65,000. It is Saxony's 5th most populated city after Leipzig, Dresden, Chemnitz and Zwickau, the second-largest city of the Vogtland after Gera, as well as the largest city in the Saxon Vogtland region (Sächsisches Vogtland).

The city lies on the upper reaches of the White Elster River, a tributary of the Saale, in the Central Vogtlandian Hill Country. Plauen is the southwesternmost city of a string of cities sitting in the densely populated foreland of the Elster and Ore Mountains, stretching from Plauen in the southwest via Zwickau, Chemnitz and Freiberg to Dresden in the northeast. It is the county seat of the Vogtland District. Plauen directly borders Greiz in Thuringia to the north, and it is also situated near the Saxon border with Bavaria (Franconia) and the Czech Republic (Bohemia).

Plauen and the surrounding Saxon Vogtland are known as the historic center of the German embroidery and lace industry, and the products of the region are protected under the label Plauener Spitze ("Plauen Lace"). The Elster Viaduct (Elstertalbrücke), spanning the valley of the White Elster between Plauen and Pöhl, is the second-largest bridge built out of bricks in the world, after the Göltzsch Viaduct.

Despite its location in Saxony the regional Vogtlandian dialect spoken in Plauen is a variety of East Franconian (with Saxon influences) related to the dialects of neighbouring Franconia in Bavaria. The name of the city as well as the names of many of its neighborhoods and boroughs are of Slavic origin.

== History ==
Plauen was founded by Polabian Slavs in the 12th century as "Plawe" and was passed to the Kingdom of Bohemia in 1327. The town was captured by the Archbishop of Magdeburg, Lippold von Bredow, in 1384. In 1466, it was passed to Albertine Saxony and later in 1569 to the Electorate of Saxony. Plauen became incorporated into the Kingdom of Saxony in 1806 during the Napoleonic Wars, and in 1871 it became part of the German Empire.

In the late-19th century, Plauen became a centre of textile manufacturing, specializing in Chemical lace, called Plauen lace. Around 1910, Plauen, as an industrial 'boomtown' of the region, reached its population peak (1910 census: 121,000, 1912: 128,000). Plauen's population, however, has shrunk dramatically since the Second World War (1939: 111,000 inhabitants).

In the 1930s, Plauen hosted the first chapter of the Nazi Party outside of Bavaria.

During the war, the Nazis operated a prison in the town, and three subcamps of the Flossenbürg concentration camp. Five hundred women, mostly Polish, but also Russian, Italian, French, Yugoslavian and Croatian, were imprisoned and used as forced labour in the first two subcamps, and 50 men from various countries were imprisoned in the third subcamp. In June 1943, the Stalag 366 prisoner-of-war camp was relocated from Kremenchuk to Plauen, and then dissolved in July 1943. It was occupied by American troops on 16 April 1945 but was left to Red Army on 1 July 1945. On 15 December 1945, the city issued 7 semi-postal postage stamps of its own to raise money for reconstruction.

From 1945 onwards, Plauen fell into the Soviet occupation zone of Germany, which later became the German Democratic Republic (1949–1990). Plauen hosted a large Red Army occupation garrison and, in the last years of the GDR (DDR), an officer school of the Border Guards ("Grenztruppen der DDR"). The first mass demonstration against the communist regime in the GDR began in Plauen on 7 October 1989; this was the beginning of a series of mass demonstrations across the country and ultimately led to the re-unification of Germany in 1990.

The exposé Fast Food Nation gives special mention to Plauen as the first city of the GDR to have a McDonald's restaurant following the collapse of the Berlin Wall.

As part of Saxony's local government reform of 1 July 2008, Plauen lost its status as a district-free city and was integrated into the Vogtlandkreis district.

== Jewish community of Plauen ==
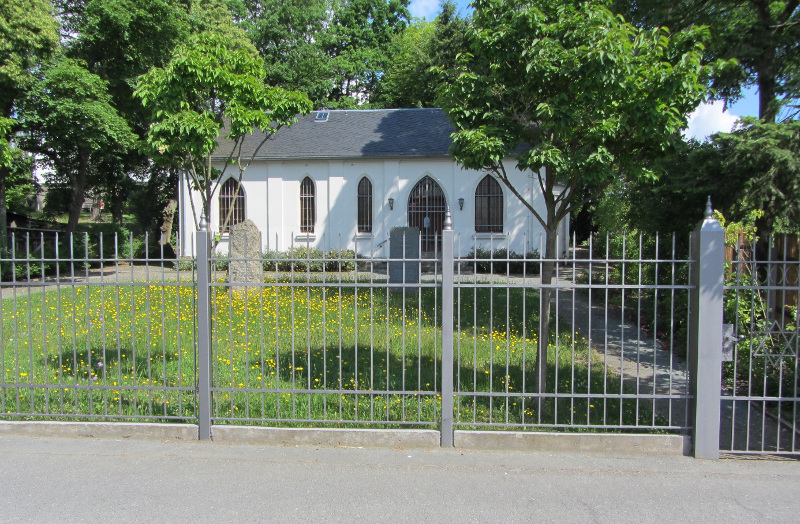

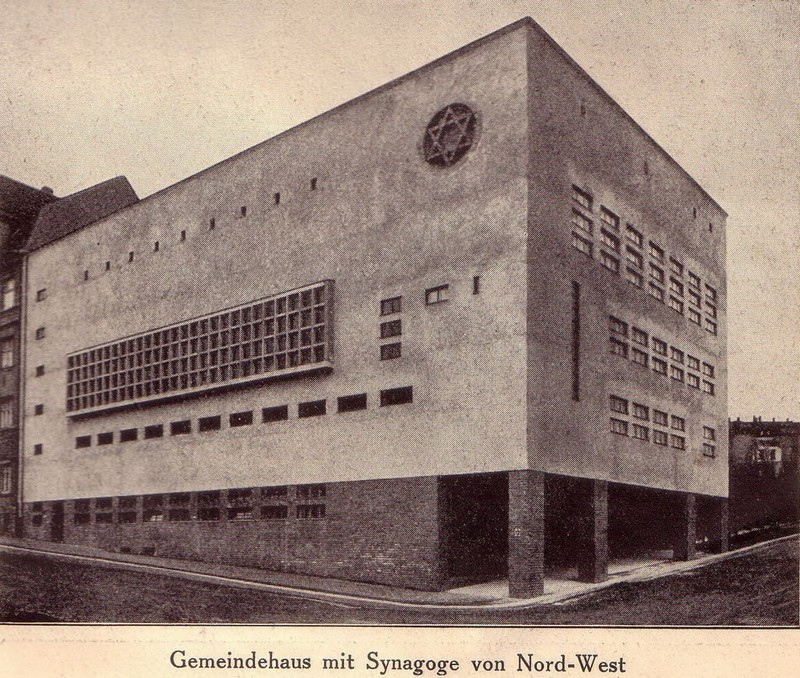
https://www.plauen.de/Verwaltung-und-Stadtrat/Stadtinformationen/Wahlen/Landratswahl-am-03-07-2022/Gemeindehaus-mit-Synagoge.php?object=tx,3317.3.1&ModID=6&FID=3317.2359.1&NavID=3317.2051&La=1&kuo=1

The Jewish community of Plauen dates back to the early 14th century and numbered several hundred between the two world wars. A reform-Jewish, bauhaus-style synagogue was opened in 1930, only to be demolished in 1938 during the Kristallnacht.

Plauen becoming a Nazi stronghold, attacks against the Jewish community were frequent in the 1920s. Physically labelled Jews are documented from 1932. Most of the Jewish population either left or was killed during The Holocaust. Today, no Jewish community exists in Plauen. The city of Plauen maintains a few sites in the city to commemorate past Jewish life in Plauen, such as the Jewish Cemetery.

A 3D-model of the Jewish Synagogue of Plauen was designed by Marc Grellert and his team from the TU Darmstadt as a part of his project to 3D-design German synagogues that were demolished before, during and after WW2.

== Politics ==
The first freely elected mayor after German reunification was Rolf Magerkord of the Christian Democratic Union (CDU), who served from 1990 to 2000. The mayor was originally chosen by the city council, but since 1994 has been directly elected. Ralf Oberdorfer of the Free Democratic Party (FDP) was mayor between 2000 and 2021. The most recent mayoral election was held in two rounds on 13 June and 4 July 2021, in which Steffen Zenner (CDU) was elected.

Candidate	Party	First round		Second round	
Candidate	Party	Votes	%	Votes	%
Steffen Zenner	Christian Democratic Union	8,390	33.5	8,768	41.1
Silvia Queck-Händel	Independent	5,881	23.5	6,477	30.4
Lars Buchmann	Independent	4,197	16.8	4,398	20.6
Ingo Eckardt	Independent	2,077	8.3	Withdrew	
Thomas Kaden	Free Saxons	1,865	7.5	1,107	5.2
Thomas Haubenreißer	Free Democratic Party	1,635	6.5	Withdrew	
Andreas Ernstberger	Independent	970	3.9	574	2.7
Valid votes		25,015	99.6	21,324	99.8
Invalid votes		113	0.4	53	0.2
Total		25,128	100.0	21,377	100.0
Electorate/voter turnout		51,961	48.4	51,926	41.2
Source: City of Plauen

The most recent city council election was held on 9 June 2024, and the results were as follows:

Party	Votes	%	±	Seats	±
Alternative for Germany (AfD)	24,718	28.1	▲8.1	12	▲3
Christian Democratic Union (CDU)	22,638	25.8	▲2.1	11	0
Sahra Wagenknecht Alliance (BSW)	11,730	13.4	New	5	New
Social Democratic Party (SPD)	8,155	9.3	▼4.7	4	▼2
Free Democratic Party (FDP)	4,356	5.0	▼4.9	2	▼2
The Left (Die Linke)	4,333	4.9	▼9.7	2	▼4
Initiative Plauen (WV)	4,179	4.8	▼0.6	2	0
Voter Initiative Plauener List (PL)	4,123	4.7	New	2	New
Alliance 90/The Greens (Grüne)	3,658	4.2	▼4.4	2	▼1
Valid votes	87,890	100.0			
Total ballots	30,855	100.0		42	±0
Electorate/voter turnout	50,803	60.7	▲2.5		
Source: City of Plauen

== Industry and infrastructure ==
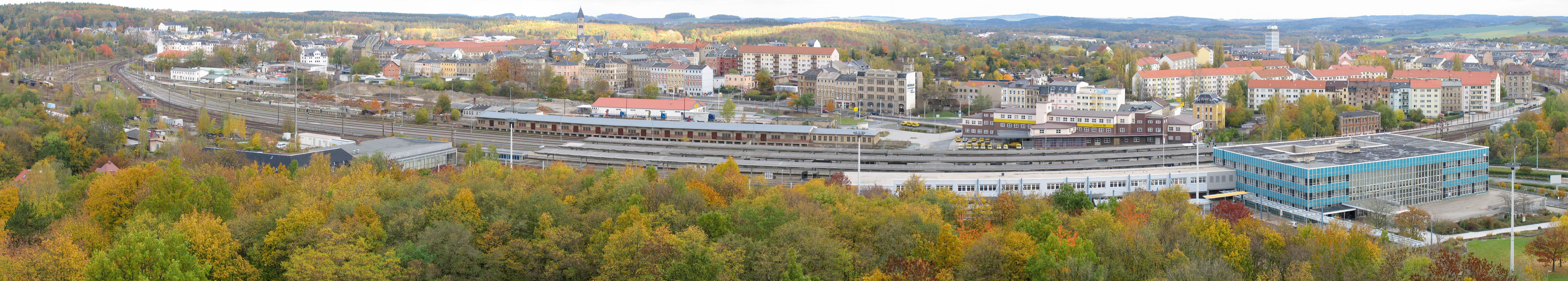
Plauen station

Plauen (Vogtland) Oberer Bahnhof lies on the Leipzig–Hof line. The section of this line through Plauen is part of the Saxon-Franconian trunk line running between Nürnberg, Hof, Plauen, Zwickau, Chemnitz and Dresden. The city had another station, Plauen (Vogtland) Unterer station (now defunct), on the Elster Valley Railway. There is a plan to rename the Oberer (Upper) station into Plauen Hauptbahnhof (Main Station).

Vogtlandbahn (Vogtland Railway), a regional train company, operates services from Plauen to Hof, Werdau, Chemnitz, Zwickau, Falkenstein and Adorf within Germany and Cheb in the Czech Republic. At these stations, there are other Vogtlandbahn services to Munich, Regensburg, Marktredwitz, Dresden and Leipzig within Germany and Karlovy Vary and Prague in the Czech Republic. A Vogtlandbahn Express Bus service runs between Plauen and Berlin Schönefeld Airport and Zoological Garden.

The Plauen Straßenbahn is a tram system with 6 lines connecting the city centre, the central Plauen-Tunnel stop, to the surrounding areas and the upper railway station (Oberer Bahnhof).

== Main sights ==
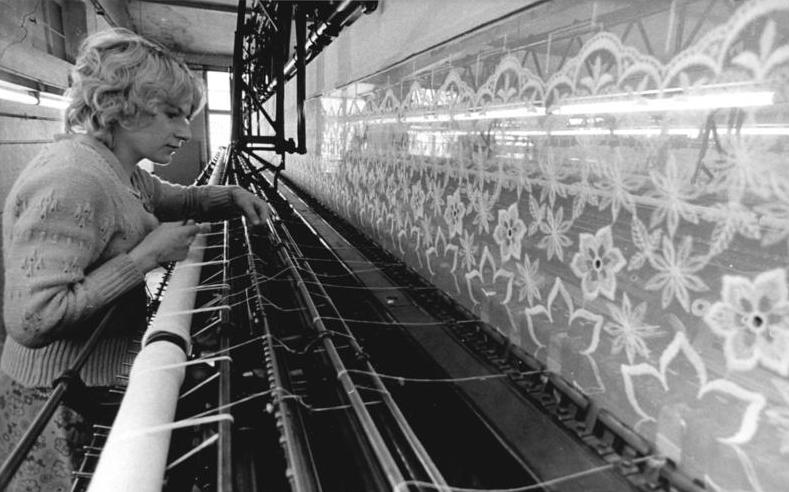
Lace curtain factory, 1980

- Embroidery Machine Museum
- Fabrik der Fäden - textile and lace making museum
- Galerie e.o.plauen – Kunstmuseum Erich Ohser - Erich-Ohser-Haus
- Old City Hall
- Elster Viaduct – second largest brick bridge in the world
- Friedensbrücke – historic bridge
- Göltzsch Viaduct – largest stone arch bridge in the world
- Johanniskirche
- Old Elster Viaduct – oldest bridge in Saxony
- Malzhaus

== Education and science ==
Plauen is home to a University of Applied Sciences with about 300 students and a DIPLOMA Fachhochschule.

== Transport ==
The town is served by Plauen (Vogtland) Oberer Bahnhof with direct train routes to city of Dresden and other towns such as Hof and Reichenbach im Vogtland.

Hof–Plauen Airport is located 46 km (29 mi) south west. However, there are no schedule flights to/from the airport. The nearest airports to the town are:

- Leipzig/Halle Airport, located 145 km (90 mi) north.
- Erfurt Weimar Airport, located 152 km (94 mi) north west.
- Dresden Airport, located 153 km (95 mi) north east.
- Nuremberg Airport, located 166 km (103 mi) south west.

== Twin towns – sister cities ==
Plauen is twinned with:

- Aš, Czech Republic (1962)
- Steyr, Austria (1970)
- Hof, Germany (1987)
- Siegen, Germany (1990)
- Cegléd, Hungary (2005)
- Pabianice, Poland (2006)
- Šiauliai, Lithuania (2010)

The urban district of Jößnitz is twinned with Heilsbronn, Germany.

== Notable people ==
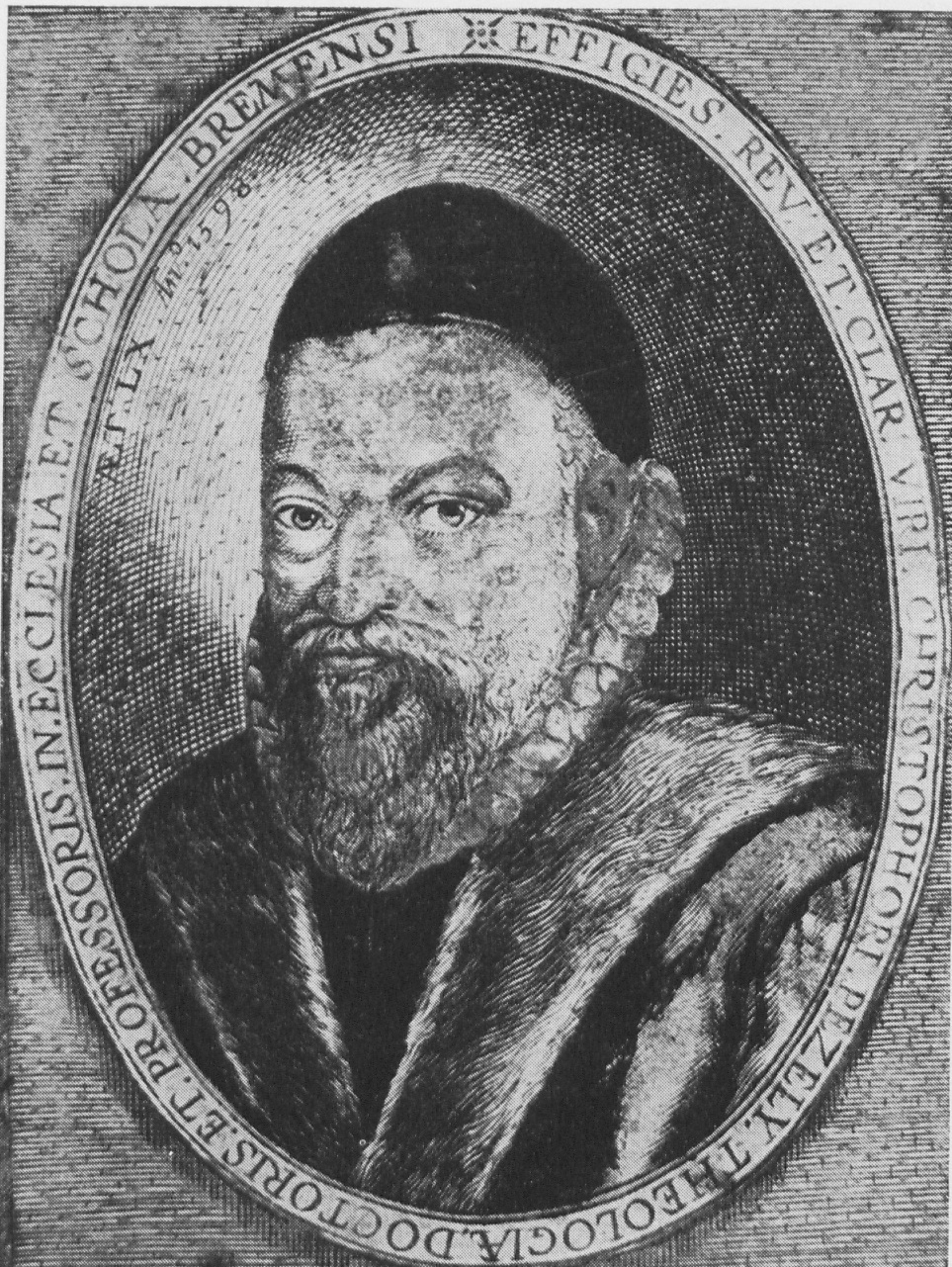
Christoph Pezel 1598

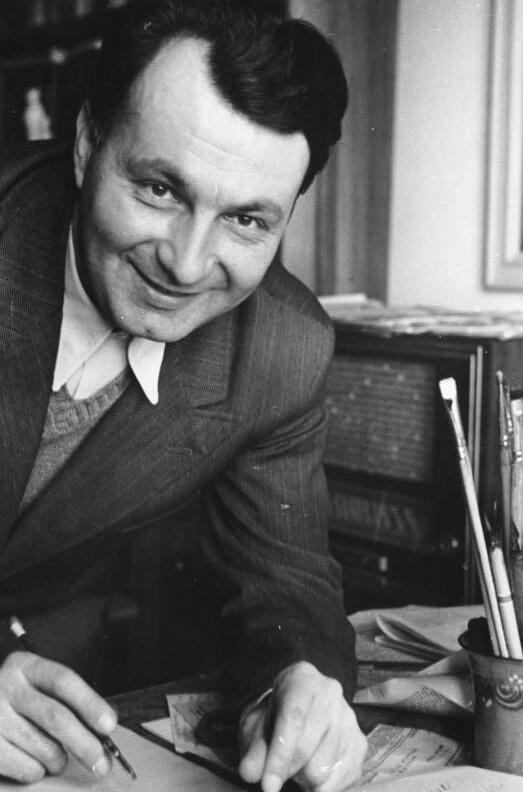
E. O. Plauen 1943

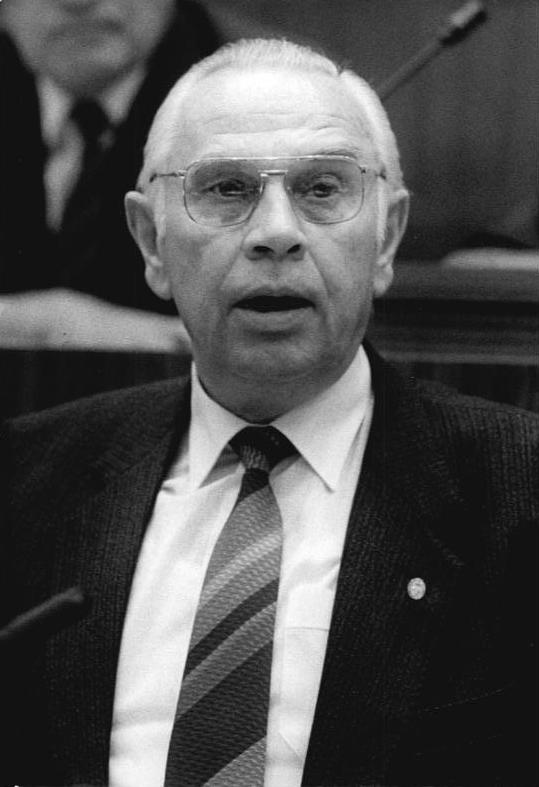
Horst Dohlus 1986

- Heinrich von Plauen (1370–1429), Grand Master of the Teutonic Knights
- Christoph Pezel (1539–1604), theologian
- Georg Samuel Dörffel (1643-1688), astronomer and clergyman
- Johann von Mayr (1716–1759), Prussian general
- Ferdinand Gotthelf Hand (1786–1851), philologist
- Eduard Friedrich Poeppig (1798–1868), botanist, zoologist and explorer
- Gustav Hartenstein (1808–1890), philosopher
- Charles Beyer (1813–1876), locomotive designer and engineer
- Emil Kautzsch (1841–1910), theologian
- Eduard Johnson (1840-1903), local historian, journalist, author of Latin and Greek phrasebooks
- Arwed Rossbach (1844–1902), architect in Leipzig
- Hermann Vogel (1854–1921), illustrator
- Arthur Hess (1891–1959), SA general and Nazi politician
- Kurt Helbig (1901–1975), weightlifter
- Friedrich Hielscher (1902–1990), religious philosopher, writer and resistance fighter against Nazism
- E.O. Plauen (1903–1944), cartoonist
- Paul Wessel (1904–1967), politician (SED)
- Egon Zill (1906–1974), Nazi SS commandant of the Flossenbürg concentration camp
- Werner Hartenstein (1908–1943), war-time commander of U-156
- Walter Ballhause (1911–1991), photographer
- Horst Dohlus (1925–2007), SED functionary
- Karl Richter (1926–1981), conductor, organist, and harpsichordist
- Hans Otte (1926–2007), composer and pianist
- Klaus Zoephel (1929–2017), composer and conductor
- Klaus Zink (born 1936), footballer
- Angelika Bahmann (born 1952), slalom canoeist, Olympic champion
- Kornelia Ender (born 1958), swimmer, Olympic champion
- Volker Eckert (1959–2007), serial killer
- Matthias Freihof (born 1961), television actor and director
- Andrea Stolletz (born 1963), handball player
- Olaf Schubert (born 1967), comedian and musician
- Martin Dulig (born 1974), politician (SPD)
- Philip Geipel (born 1986), racing driver
- Christian Bahmann (born 1981), slalom canoeist
- Juliane Pfeil (born 1987), politician (SPD)
- Christin Zenner (born 1991), swimmer
- Linda-Philomène Tsoungui (born 1992), drummer for The Mars Volta
- Kassem Taher Saleh (born 1993), politician (Alliance 90/The Greens)

=== Honorary citizens ===
- Martin Mutschmann, 1933 (revoked 1945)
- Manfred Feiler (painter), 2011

== Gallery ==
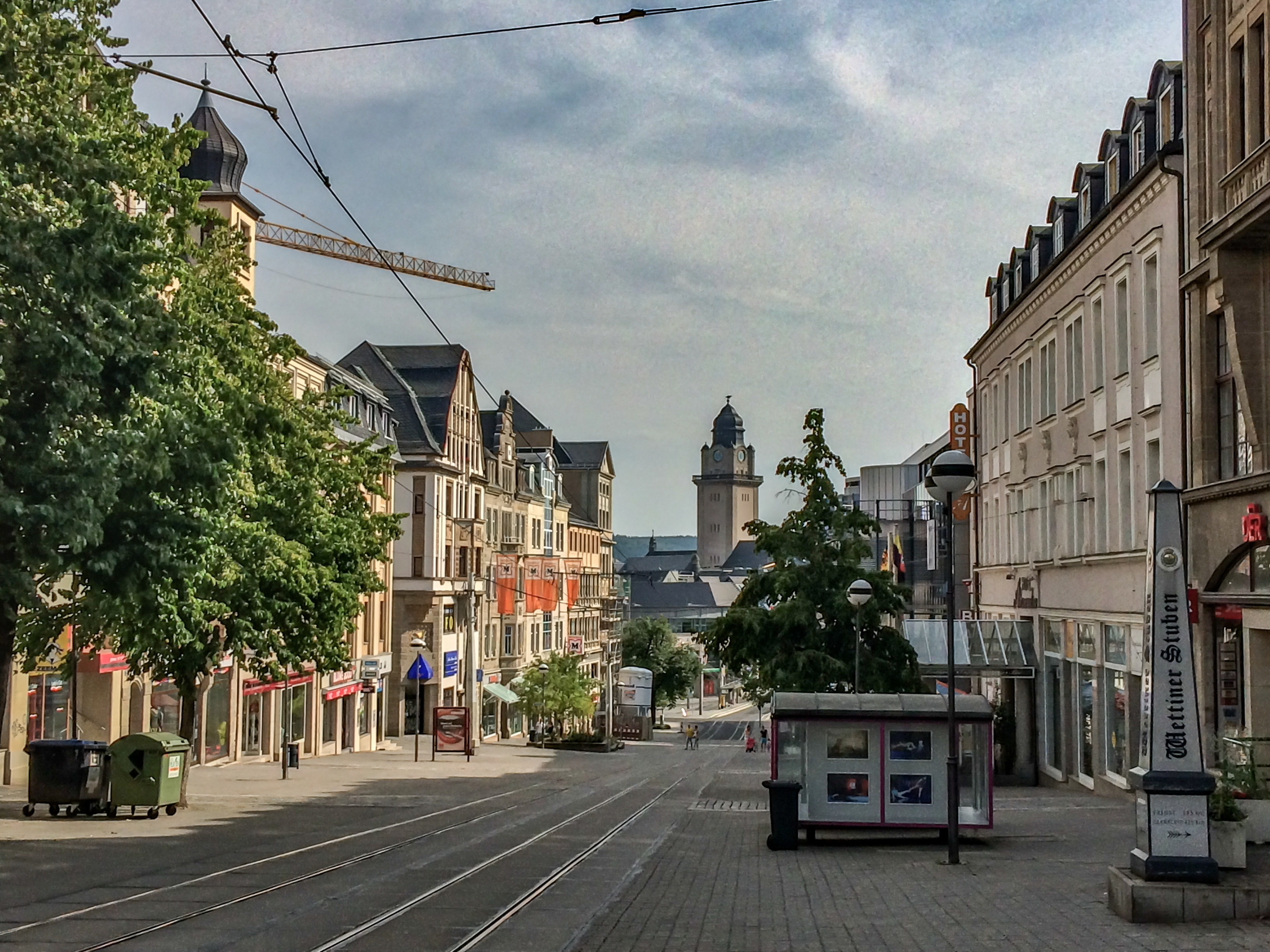
Plauen city centre

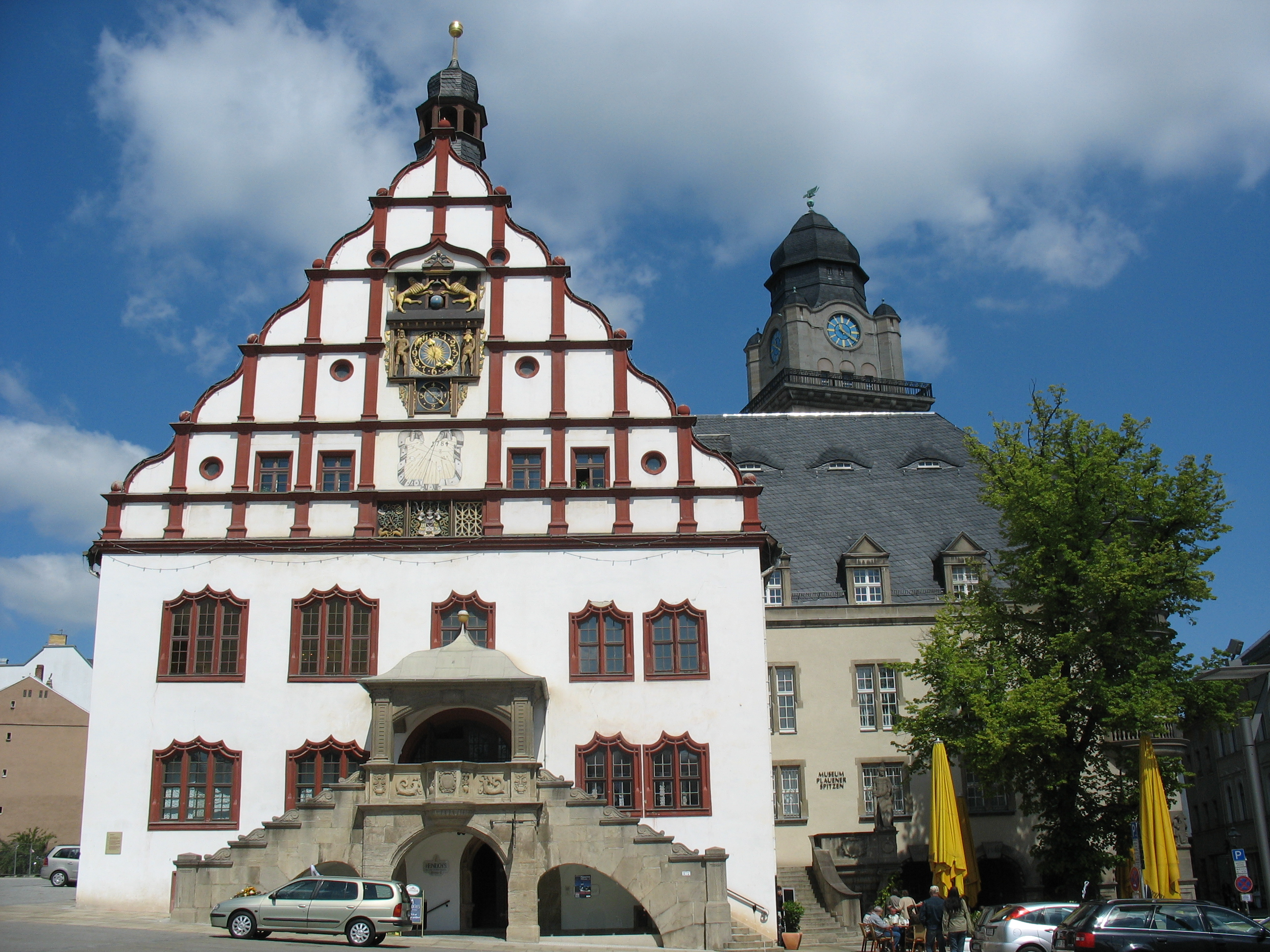
Old city hall

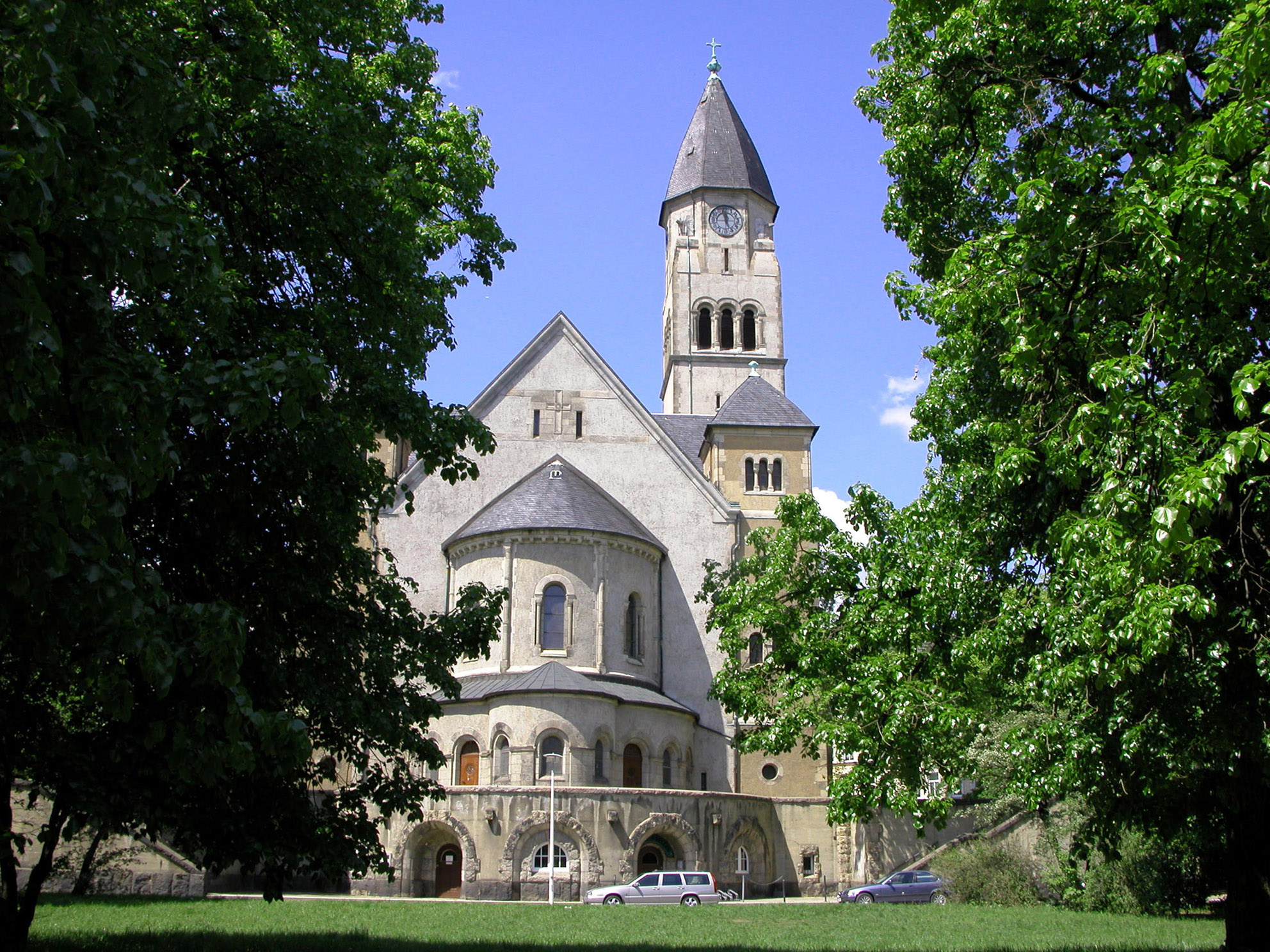
Church of St. Mark

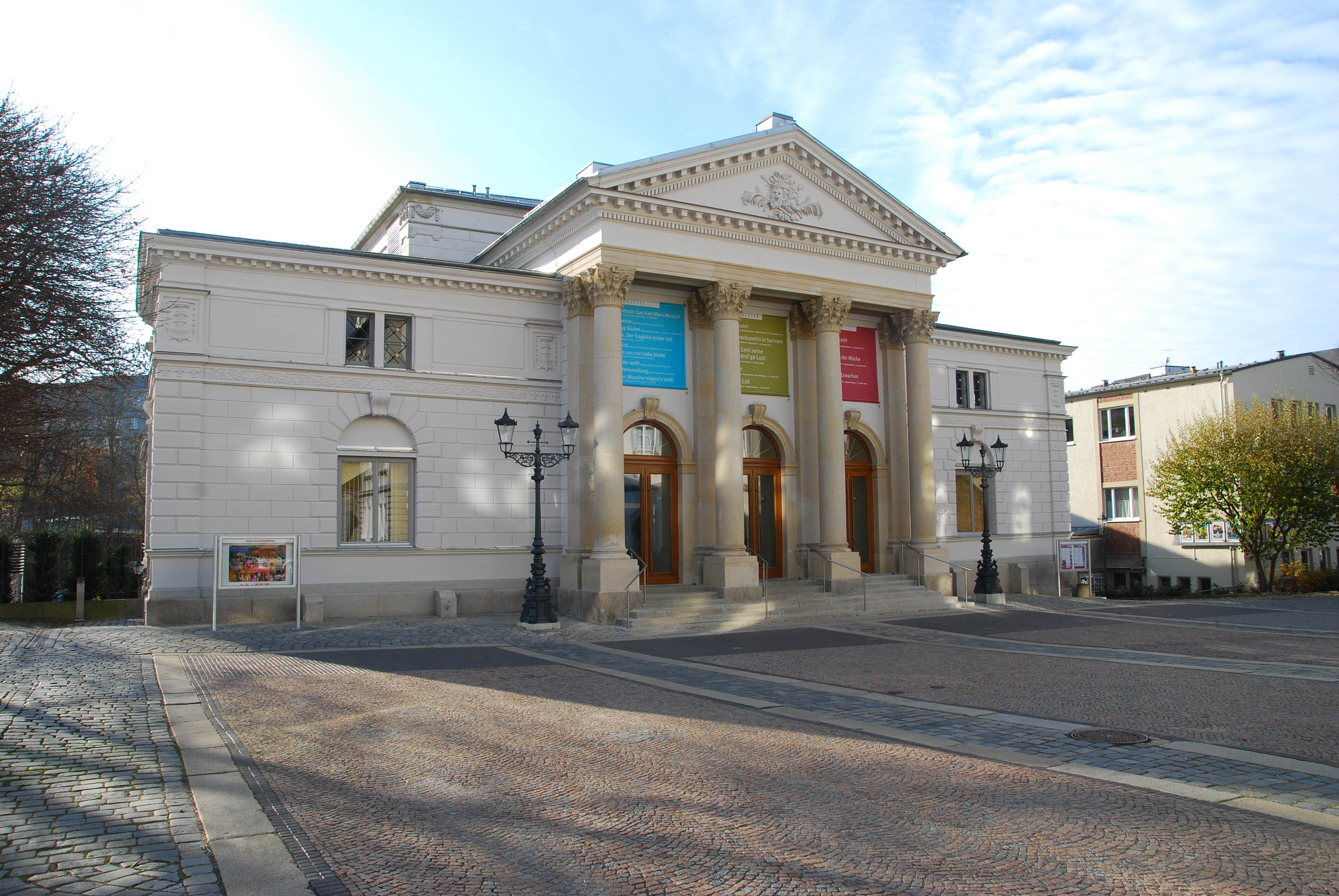
Vogtlandtheater

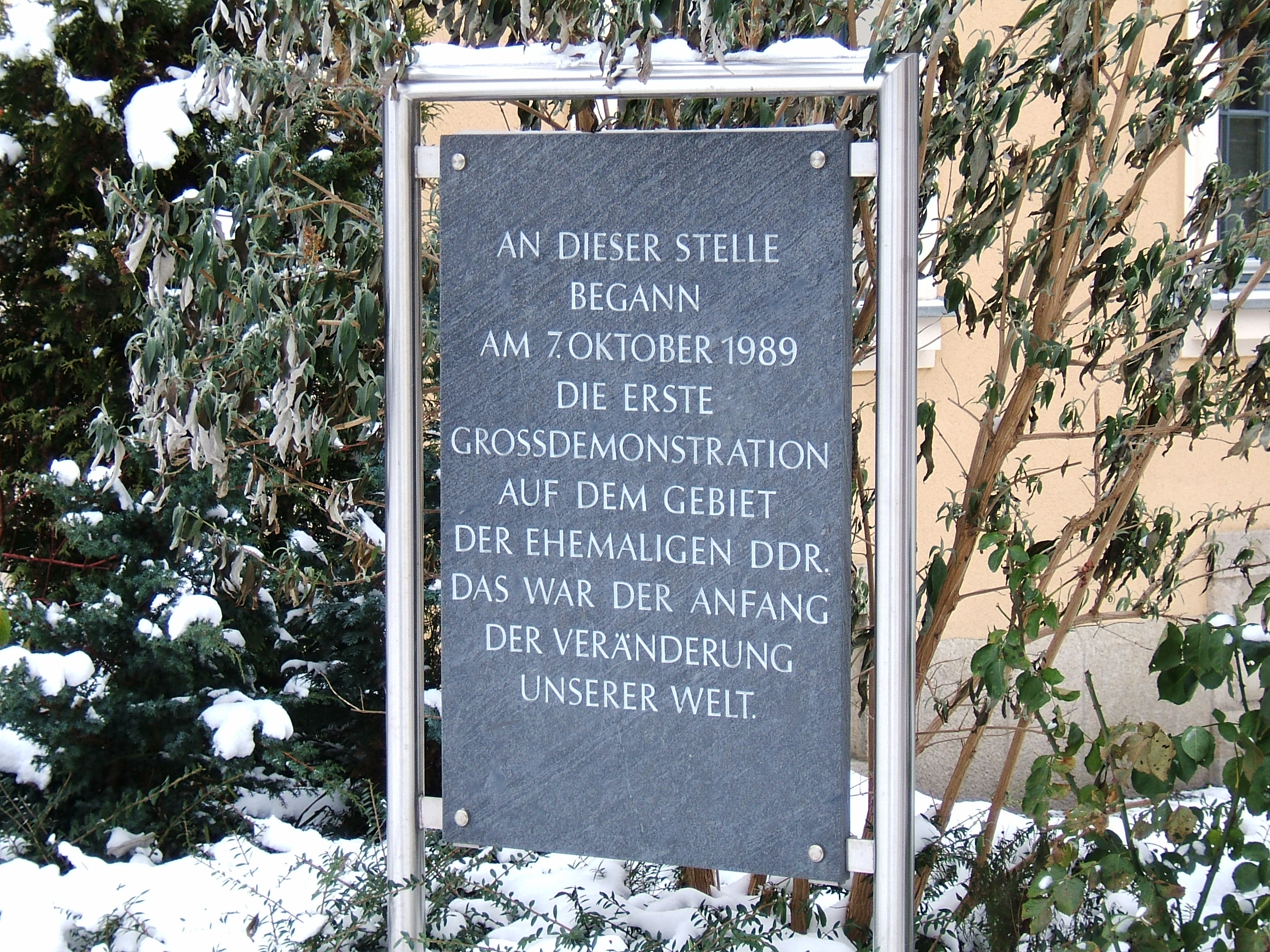
Commemorative plaque in Plauen for the mass demonstration of 1989

2025 Tram network
