= Walter Ballhause =

German photographer

Walter Ballhause (born in Hameln on 3 April 1911 – died in Plauen on 8 July 1991) was a German photographer. He was active politically and worked in social documentary photography.

== Biography ==
Born in Hameln as the son of a shoemaker, Walter Ballhause moved with his family to Hannover in 1919. He was a member of the socialist organization Socialist Youth of Germany – Falcons and of the Social Democratic Party of Germany. In 1931 he and Otto Brenner founded the local group of the Socialist Workers' Party of Germany in Hannover. From then on Ballhause started to make photographs in a social environment. In 1933 he was arrested for a short time for political reasons. From 1934 to 1941 he took classes in Hannover as chemical technician and he moved 1941 to Plauen, where he worked as the head of the labs of the company Vomag. Ballhause was arrested again in 1944 and was freed on 17 April 1945 by American soldiers of the 89th Infantry Division. Ballhause was mayor of Strassberg (Plauen) from 1947 and founded the local group of the KPD. He worked in Plauen and retired in 1971.

== Works ==
The works of Walter Ballhause were made known to the public only in the 1970s. Since then they have been acknowledged because they represent, with a high artistic quality, people in the environment in which they live, in particular on the margins of society. The bulk of his work, done between 1930 and 1933, is a testimony of the proletariat, the situation of jobless people, beggars, children in big cities and elderly people. Ballhause's photographs were made in workers' settlements, holiday camps for youth and sports camps for workers. He showed both his own political activities in the Socialist Workers' Party of Germany and those of the Nazi Party. He often took pictures with a hidden camera.

== Film ==
- Walter Ballhause – Einer von Millionen. DEFA-Dokumentary, Portrait, Director: Karlheinz Mund, 1982
