= Johann Matthias Schröckh =

Austrian-German historian and literary scholar

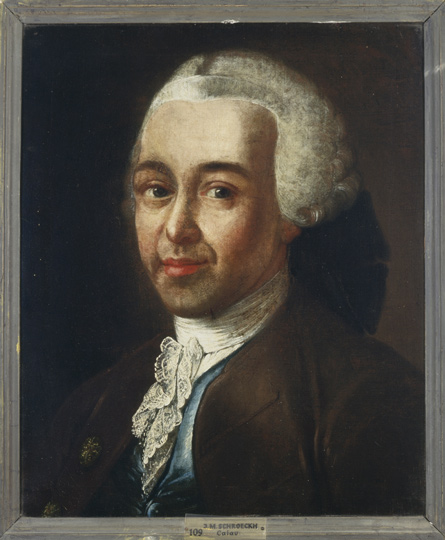
Johann Matthias Schröckh (1733-1808)

Johann Matthias Schröckh (July 26, 1733 – August 1, 1808) was an Austrian-German historian and literary scholar born in Vienna. He was a grandson to Pietist preacher Matthias Bel (1684–1749).

In 1751 he began his studies at the University of Göttingen, where he had as instructors, church historian Johann Lorenz von Mosheim (1693–1755) and Orientalist Johann David Michaelis (1717–1791). He continued his education at the University of Leipzig, earning his master's degree in 1755. During the following year he received his habilitation, and in 1762 became an associate professor of philosophy. Later he relocated to the University of Wittenberg, where in 1775 he was appointed professor of history.

Known for his prodigious literary output, Schröckh was the author of acclaimed works involving universal history, church history, history books for children, biographical studies, et al. His main work involved the 35-volume Christliche Kirchengeschichte (Christian Church History, 1768–1803) and its sequel Christliche Kirchengeschichte seit der Reformation (Christian Church History since the Reformation 1804–1812, 10 volumes), with the last two volumes being prepared by Heinrich Gottlieb Tzschirner (1778–1828).

== Selected publications ==
- Abbildungen und Lebensbeschreibungen berühmter Gelehrten (Images and biographies of famous scholars), 1764
- Lehrbuch der allgemeinen Weltgeschichte zum Gebrauche bei dem ersten Unterrichte der Jugend (Textbook of general world history for use as first lessons for young people), 1774
- Historia religionis et ecclesiae christianae, 1777
- Allgemeine Weltgeschichte für Kinder (General world history for children), 1779-1784
- Einleitung zur Universalhistorie: Umarbeitung von Hilmar Curas (Introduction of universal history: revision of Hilmar Curas), 1757
- Christliche Kirchengeschichte (Christian church history); 35 volumes, 1768–1803
- Christliche Kirchengeschichte seit der Reformation (Christian church history since the Reformation); with HG Tzschirner, 1804–1812.
