= Christian Wilhelm Niedner =

German church historian and theologian

Christian Wilhelm Niedner (9 August 1797 – 13 August 1865) was a German church historian and theologian born in Oberwinkel, which today is part of the town of Waldenburg, Saxony.

He studied theology at the University of Leipzig, where in 1826 he received his habilitation. In 1829 he was appointed associate professor, and in 1838 became a full professor of theology at Leipzig. From 1845 onward, he was head of the Leipzig Historical and Theological Society. In 1850 he resigned his professorship and moved to Wittenberg, where he focused on private studies. In 1859 Niedner was appointed professor of historical theology at Berlin, and was also Consistorialrath to the Province of Brandenburg.

His best written effort was the highly regarded Geschichte der christlichen Kirche ("History of the Christian Church"); (1846, second edition 1866). In 1829 he edited and published Heinrich Gottlieb Tzschirner's Der Fall des Heidenthums ("The Fall of Paganism"). From 1845 to 1865 he was editor of the journal Zeitschrift für historische Theologie ("Journal of Historical Theology").
