= Karl Gottfried Wilhelm Theile =

German theologian

Karl Gottfried Wilhelm Theile (25 February 1799, Großkorbetha – 8 October 1854, Leipzig) was a German theologian.

From 1817 to 1823 he studied at the University of Leipzig, where he subsequently received his PhD (1823) and degree in theology (1828). From 1826 to 1845 he was an associate professor of Evangelical theology at Leipzig, followed by a full professorship in the same discipline from 1845 up until his death in 1854. In 1851/52 he was dean to the theological faculty at Leipzig.

== Published works ==
With Rudolf Ewald Stier, he was co-author of a Polyglot Bible, titled Polyglotten--Bibel zum praktischen Handgebrauch: Die Heilige Schrift Alten und Neuen Testaments in übersichtlicher Nebeneinanderstellung des Urtextes, der Septuaginta, Vulgata und Luther-Uebersetzung, so wie der wichtigsten Varianten der vornehmsten deutschen Uebersetzungen ("Polyglot Bible for practical use as a handbook: The Holy Bible; Old and New Testaments in a clear juxtaposition of the original texts, the Septuagint, Vulgate and Luther translations, as the more important variants of the most distinguished German translations"). Other noteworthy written efforts by Theile include:

- De trium evangeliorum necessitudine (with Christian Wilhelm Niedner), 1823.
- Notitia novi commentarii in Novum Testamentum, 1829.
- Tabulae rerum dogmaticarum compendiariae, 1830.
- Commentarius in Epistolam Jacobi, 1833.
- Zur Biographie Jesu, 1837 – Biography of Jesus.
- Thesaurus literaturae theologicae academicae sive recensus dissertationum, 1840.
- He kaine diatheke, 1844.
- Novum testamentum graece, 1852.
