= Heinrich Gottlieb Tzschirner =

German Protestant theologian (1778–1828)

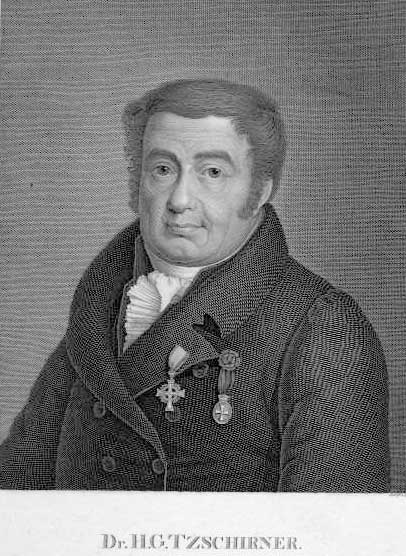
Heinrich Gottlieb Tzschirner (1778-1828)

Heinrich Gottlieb Tzschirner (14 November 1778 – 17 February 1828) was a German Protestant theologian born in Mittweida, Saxony.

He studied theology at the University of Leipzig, receiving his habilitation in 1800 with assistance from Dresden examinator Franz Volkmar Reinhard (1753-1812). For a period of time he worked as a private lecturer at the University of Wittenberg, and following his father's death became deacon in his home town of Mittweida. In 1805 he was appointed professor of theology at Wittenberg, later returning to Leipzig (1809), where in 1811 he became rector of the university.

In 1813 he joined the Saxon Army as a chaplain during the Napoleonic Wars. He returned to Leipzig the following year, subsequently becoming archdeacon of St. Thomas Church and superintendent of the Diocese of Leipzig.

As a theologian, Tzschirner was an advocate of ethical and critical rationalism, believing that common sense morality was the supreme principle of Christianity. In one of his better known works, Protestantismus and Katholicismus aus dem Standpunkte der Politik betrachlet, he staunchly defended the Protestant cause versus Catholicism. In addition to his own written works, he continued publication of Johann Matthias Schröckh's Christliche Kirchengeschichte seit der Reformation (Church History since the Reformation) after Schröckh's death in 1808.

== Selected publications ==
- Geschichte der Apologetik (History of apologetics), 1805
- Ueber die Verwandtschaft der Tugenden und der Laster (Relationship of virtues and vices), 1809
- Predigten (Collection of sermons), 1812
- Ueber Johann Matthias Schröckh's Leben, Charakter und Schriften (Johann Matthias Schröckh's life, character and writings), 1812
- Ueber den Krieg, ein philosophischer Versuch (About the war, a philosophical approach), 1815
- Die Ehe aus dem Gesichtspunkte der Natur, der Moral und der Kirche (Marriage of the elements of nature, morality and the church), 1819
- Protestantismus und Katholicismus aus dem Standpuncte der Politik (Protestantism and Catholicism from a political standpoint), 1822
- Die Gefahr einer Deutschen Revolution (The Danger of a German revolution), 1823
- Der Fall des Heidenthums (The fall of heathenism), 1829
