= Blaufelden =

- Municipality
- Coat of arms

- Location of Blaufelden within Schwäbisch Hall district
- Interactive map of Blaufelden
- Location within Germany Location within Baden-Württemberg
- Coordinates: 49°17′49″N 09°58′19″E
- Country: Germany
- State: Baden-Württemberg
- Admin. region: Stuttgart
- District: Schwäbisch Hall

Government
  - Mayor (2023–31): Michael Stefan Dieterich (Ind.)

Area
  - Total: 90.18 km^{2} (34.82 sq mi)
- Elevation: 460 m (1,510 ft)

Population (2025-12-31)
  - Total: 5,348
  - Density: 59.30/km^{2} (153.6/sq mi)
- Time zone: UTC+01:00 (CET)
  - Summer (DST): UTC+02:00 (CEST)
- Postal codes: 74572
- Dialling codes: 07953
- Vehicle registration: SHA
- Website: www.blaufelden.de

Blaufelden (German pronunciation: [ˈblaʊ̯ˌfɛldn̩]) is a municipality in the district of Schwäbisch Hall in Baden-Württemberg in Germany.

The settlement is first mentioned in a document from 1157. The Reformation was introduced to Blaufelden in 1526 and it has been Lutheran ever since.
