= Chicago Embroidery Company =

The Chicago Embroidery Company was founded in 1890 by Johannes Bodenmann, who came to the United States from Switzerland and eventually settled in Chicago in the later part of the nineteenth century. He used his lace making skills and knowledge to form the company, which was formally incorporated in 1894.

== History ==
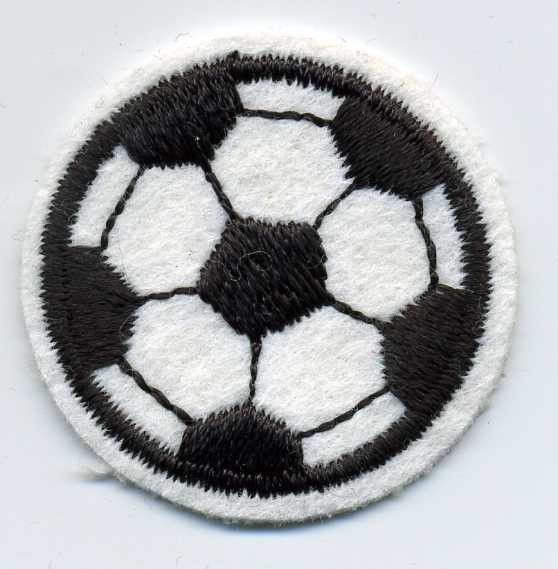
Example of an embroidered patch used by youth soccer team

During long cold winter nights, Swiss farmers and their families concentrated on handicrafts that could be sold for extra income. The Swiss embroidery tradition, which has roots in flax and linen production dating back hundreds of years, led to the development of distinctive Swiss lace, an intricate, interlaced pattern of threads, looped, twisted or braided to other threads, known throughout the world for its quality and workmanship. Handmade lace and so called hand machine embroidery was often used in decorative clothing, curtains, table linens and many other applications.

Lace making and embroidery changed during the Industrial Revolution with the development of automated lace machines, and the schiffli embroidery machine which greatly increased production efficiency and provided the capability to reproduce any number of identical pieces. In 1913, New Yorker John Avery, an advertising counselor and associate sales manager at Arnold B. Heine Co., a New York-based lace and embroidery company, acquired a one-third interest in the Chicago Embroidery Company.

The company prospered, but Swiss-style lace fell out of fashion in the 1930s. During this period, The Chicago Embroidery company was asked to stitch designs on men's socks, however no one knew how to do this because the sock had to be stitched after it was made and the power looms could not make a design without stitching the sock closed. The company met this challenge by creating a special holder for the socks that allowed the power looms to stitch a design without ruining the sock and in 1938, Otto DeCardy filed for and was granted U.S. patent 2,141,294 for a specialized hose embroidery machine.

[2]

With the start of World War II, the U.S. military suddenly needed for millions of embroidered patches to signify rank, unit, and specialty of members of the armed forces. The U.S. Government ordered the major embroidery companies to begin making embroidered patches (also known as shoulder sleeve insignia or SSI) and the looms were converted from lacemaking to war patch production.

After the war, a Chicago cap manufacturer approached the company with an order for patches to be sewn on to caps and sold to members of the Boy Scouts of America (BSA). This was the beginning of many decades of a business relationship between Chicago Embroidery and the BSA and other Scouting organizations. In the years following the war, the company continued making military SSI patches and many different designs for large and small companies, police and fire departments, municipalities, youth groups, sporting organizations and others. During the 1970s, decorative patches became a fashionable clothing accessory for the general public. Chicago Embroidery opened a second factory, and with three shifts working six days a week on more than 20 looms, millions of patches were produced for shipment around the world.

== Modern era ==
But with the introduction of new direct embroidery technology in the 1980s, the embroidered patch industry underwent a major upheaval. Computerized digital sewing machines allowed intricate designs to be sewn directly onto shirts, jackets, caps, or other items. While customers continued to buy patches, demand dramatically decreased. Boy Scout membership peaked in 1973 and the number of U.S. military personnel peaked in the early 1980s. Demand for patches began to decline.

By the turn of the millennium, direct embroidery had taken a huge portion of market share away from patches, and low-cost competition from the Far East pressured U.S. patch manufacturers. More production shifted to China. In 2007, after three generations of family owners, the company was sold to a former employee. For the first time in its history, a Bodenmann family member was not at the helm.

The company continues to offer a full line of multi-color patches for a variety of uses and organizations.
