= Robert Reiner (businessman) =

German-American businessman (1880–1960)

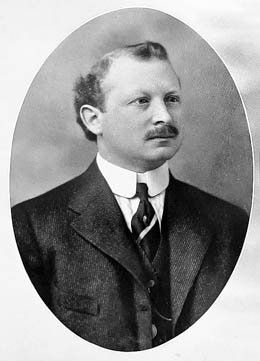
- Born: August 18, 1880; Nürtingen, Württemberg, Germany
- Died: August 22, 1960 (aged 80); Jersey City, New Jersey

Robert Reiner (18 August 1880–22 August 1960) was a machinist, entrepreneur and businessman. His business is credited with helping to expand the machine embroidery industry in Hudson County, New Jersey during the first half of the twentieth century. By the 1950s, the area known as North Hudson comprising the municipalities of Weehawken, Union City, West New York, Guttenberg, and North Bergen had developed into one of the largest centers for machine embroidery in the world. Reiner first traveled to the United States about 1902. He first installed and then began importing embroidery and other textile machines from Europe. He established what became Robert Reiner Incorporated in Weehawken. Eventually he employed about 200 people. He was the sole importer of VOMAG (Vogtländische Maschinenfabrik AG) embroidery machines from Plauen, Germany. Eventually he produced the first American made schiffli embroidery machine. Reiner held an honorary doctorate of political economy and science from the University of Heidelberg. He remained a benefactor of his native Nürtingen. He was a member of the US Chamber of Commerce, the New York Board of Trade, and was president of the American-German Chamber of Commerce until World War II. In October 1928 he was one of twenty passengers aboard the Graf Zeppelin during its first trans Atlantic commercial passenger flight, flying from Friedrichshafen, Germany to Lakehurst, New Jersey.

== Training ==
Reiner began training to be a machinist at age 15 (about 1895) at Heller Brothers in Nürtingen, Germany. He then went to work with Adolf Saurer in Arbon, Switzerland. Saurer was producing both hand machines and schiffli machines at this time. About 1900 he went to work for VOMAG in Plauen, Germany as an erector's assistant. He was 20 years old. In 1902 he traveled to Weehawken to set up VOMAG machines at E.A. Bodenmann, then returned to Switzerland and Austria until 1903. In 1904 he returned to the US and started a machine repair shop at 449 West Street, West Hoboken. In 1908 he founded and was president of Robert Reiner Importing Company. In 1909 he built the 25,000 square foot, concrete building, at 550 Gregory Ave, Weehawken which still stands and has been converted to housing. Business expanded after World War I and eventually became Robert Reiner Inc.

The broader context of Reiner's career was the machine age, which is also known as: the second industrial revolution. More specifically he worked in the machine embroidery industry. Embroidery was used in the garment industry, to embellish linens, handkerchiefs, table cloths, curtains, etc. The textile industry was an important, but labor-intensive industry before the industrial revolution. Mechanization affected multiple aspects of the textile and garment industries.

== The American machine-embroidery industry ==
The canton of St. Gallen, in eastern Switzerland, was once considered to be the embroidery center of the world. Many embroidery and embroidery machine innovations took place in Switzerland and in Saxony Germany, near Plauen. Plauen was an important center for machine lace. Saurer in Arbon, and VOMAG in Plauen became two of the largest developers and manufacturers of early embroidery machines. Each had a foundry and machine shops necessary to produce the hundreds of components used in the machines.

The first half of the twentieth century saw great advancements in machine technology including mass production, interchangeable parts, and electrification. Embroidery machines evolved quickly - from manual hand machines to the fully automated schiffli machines. Embroidery machines enabled the mass production of embroidery and lace, once considered a luxury item. U.S. demand for embroidery increased after the Civil War ended in 1865. Switzerland met much of this demand. The first and second world wars had a profound effect on the European embroidery industry and economy. The European embroidery industry collapsed during World War I. VOMAG and the city of Plauen were destroyed by bombing during World War II.

Meanwhile, a third center for machine embroidery, North Hudson, New Jersey emerged at the beginning of the twentieth century. Located on the west bank of the Hudson River, opposite New York City. Hudson County was close to the American market, e.g. New York City's garment district, textile manufacturing, and was a hub for both domestic and international transportation.

== Reiner's business ==
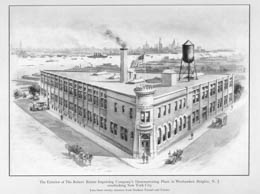
Robert Reiner Importing Company Weehawken - looking towards New York City

A photo taken circa 1903 shows an advertisement for the Robert Reiner Importing Company on the side of a horse-drawn wagon. This would have been typical of the technology at that time. But, this would quickly change. Many Swiss and Germans immigrated to Hudson County at the beginning of the century, and helped to build the industry there. They brought knowledge of the machines, and the methods that were necessary to produce embroidery and lace. Ancillary businesses that supplied fabrics, thread, embroidery designs, "punching" or translating of designs to Jacquard punch tapes, dying, chemical lace etching, and bleaching of so-called "white goods" also developed in New Jersey. This network of interdependent businesses mirrored the industries in Switzerland and Germany. Reiner's connection to VOMAG enabled him to become the sole importer of their machines The machines were manufactured in Germany at the VOMAG factory and then assembled in New Jersey. Reiner imported semi-automated schiffli machines which used a pantograph as well as fully automated schiffli machines which were programmed using a Jacquard punch card reader. He also imported punching machines which were used to encode the design onto the schiffli punch cards. The 1917 advertisement at right shows 10 and 15 meter schiffli embroidery machines. Fifteen meter machines were state of the art at that time.

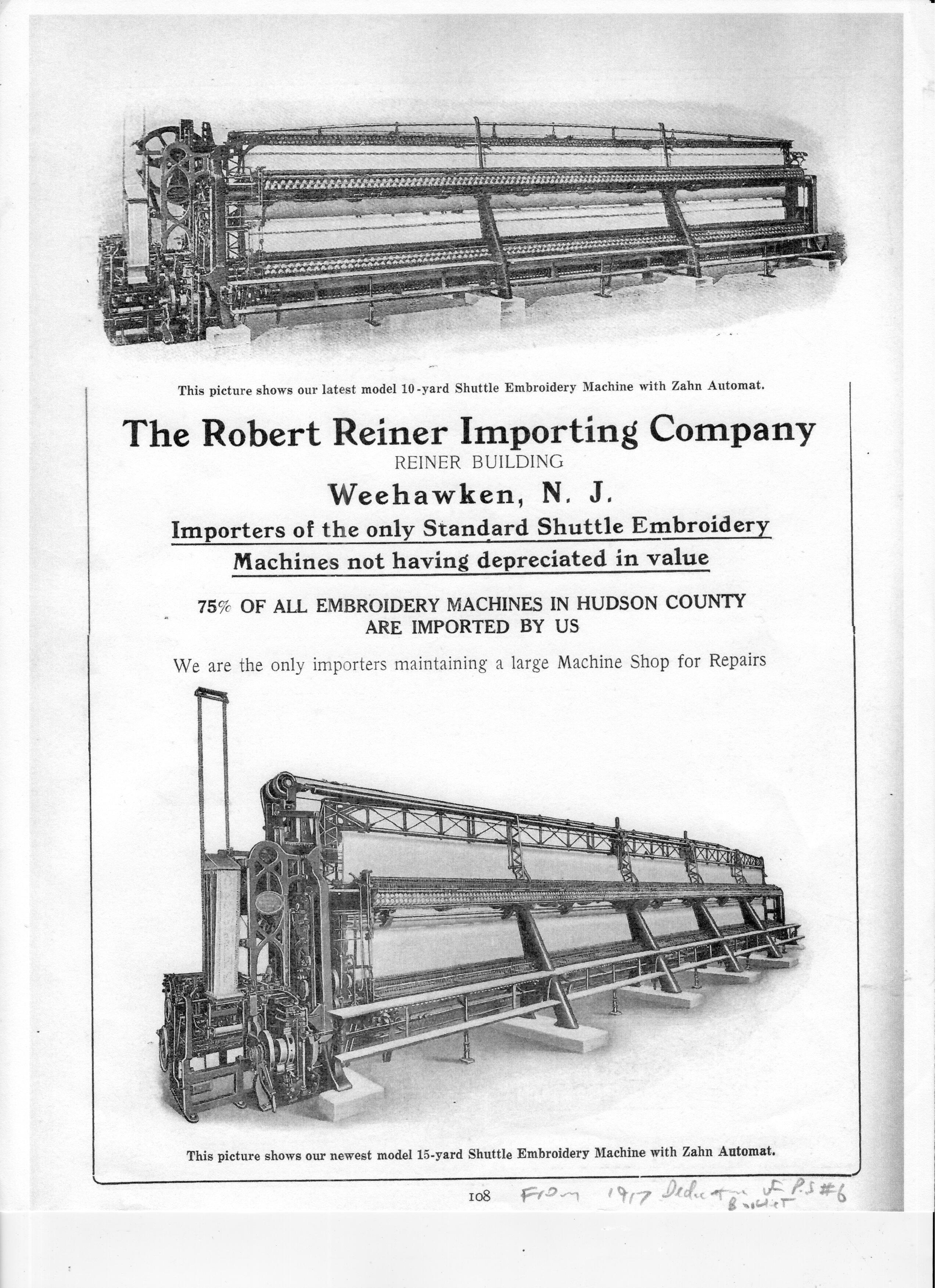
Advertisement 1917 - ten and fifteen meter schiffli embroidery machines

A Robert Reiner Importing Company catalog published about 1914 opens with an illustration of the VOMAG factory in Plauen. The captions reads: "3,800 experienced engineers and skilled workmen are continuously employed in this large establishment." The pages show awards won by VOMAG at various European expositions, and side by side portraits of Robert Reinier and the late Robert Zahn. Zahn adapted the Jacquard card reader to the embroidery machine. VOMAG's card reader was known as the automat, or the Zahn system. This was cast on the machine's frame. The catalog advertises: ten and 15-meter embroidery machines, demonstrations using the customer's own design, training, and also parts and technical support for other brands. The catalog provides a directory of every owner in the United States, and provides the following statistics: "total number of machines delivered by us in this country, 1,207." Also, "we have sold and delivered 36 pantograph machines and 72 Zahn automats (these will appear in our next year's [1915] statistics). Shuttle embroidery machines running in Switzerland, 8,090." Contemporary publications provide a similar description of the business and demonstration plant

The industry in New Jersey experienced multiple highs and lows as demand followed fashion. The Great Depression adversely affected all businesses. The war years benefitted the schiffli emblem manufacturers. Reiner's competition included Saentis (orthographic variant of: Säntis) in Union City. The latter was acquired by Saurer. Reiner and or his employees made improvements to the schiffli machine and filed multiple U.S. patents. Neither Saurer nor VOMAG exported machines during World War II. VOMAG did not rebuild after the war. In the 1950s - Reiner produced the first American built schiffli machines based on the Plauen machines. However, the cost of manufacturing them in the US was high. Reiner licensed Zangs Company in Germany to build them.
