= Robert Reiner (disambiguation) =

Rob Reiner (1947–2025) was an American filmmaker and actor.

Robert Reiner may also refer to:

- Robert Reiner (businessman) (1880–1960), a German-American businessman
- Robert Reiner (scholar), a British criminologist
