= Schiffli embroidery machine =

Industrial embroidery machine invented in 1853

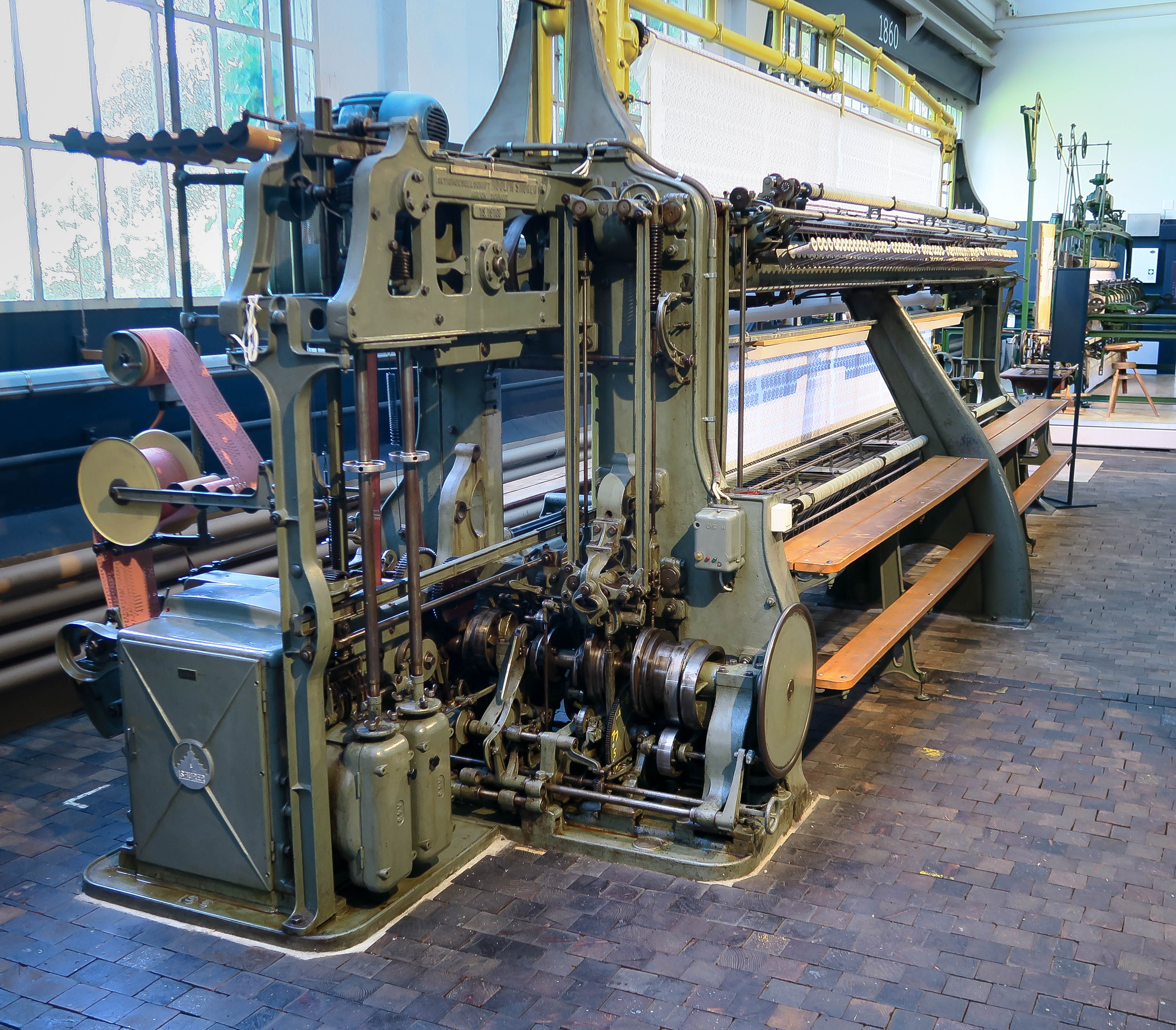
Fully automated schiffli embroidery machine by Saurer

The schiffli embroidery machine is a multi-needle, industrial embroidery machine. It was invented by Isaak Gröbli in 1863. It was used to create various types of machine embroidery and certain types of lace. It was especially used in the textile industry of eastern Switzerland and Saxony, but also in the United Kingdom and the United States. Schiffli machines evolved from, and eventually replaced manually operated "hand embroidery" machines. The hand embroidery machine used double ended needles and passed the needles completely through the fabric. Each needle had a single, continuous thread. Whereas the schiffli machine used a lock stitch, the same technique used by the sewing machine. By the early twentieth century schiffli machines had standardized to ten and fifteen meters in width and used more than 600 needles.

== Principle ==
The Schiffli machine used two threads – one on the front side and one on the back side of the fabric. The first thread is entwined with the second thread to form a lock stitch. The front side thread, or embroidery yarn, is held on a spool, or rather a creel of spools. A boat-shaped shuttle (German: Schützen or Schiffchen, Swiss German: Schiffli) carries the bobbin thread, which is also known as the schiffli yarn. There is one shuttle per needle. When the front-side needle pierces the fabric it passes the embroidery thread through the fabric from front to rear. As the needle withdraws it forms a loop on the back side of the material. The shuttle which trails the bobbin thread passes through this loop. Finally, the front-side thread is pulled tight.

Like its predecessor, the hand embroidery machine, the Schiffli machine used a row of needles and a movable frame that holds the fabric. A shuttle embroidery machine can have several hundred needles per row. The needles are stationary and the frame moves. A stitch that occurs in any given direction is accomplished by moving the frame in the opposite direction. Different manufacturers achieved different minimum stitch lengths. Saurer machines could make a stitch as small as 1/256 inch. Designs with multiple colors required re-threading all of the needles. There were also attachments for boring holes in the fabric. Both stitching and boring require very precise frame movement. Once a row of embroidery is completed the material is rolled upwards and the design is repeated.

There are several advantages to using a lock stitch: significantly longer threads can be used, the threads are less prone to breakage, and the stitch rate is much faster. This means fewer interruptions and less frequent stops to re-thread. Unlike the hand embroidery machine, the needles do not pass completely through the fabric. Since the manual embroidery machine required the thread to be pulled completely through the fabric, after each front and back side stitch, its thread length was limited by the depth of the machine. A schiffli spool on the other hand, could hold more than 500 yards of embroidery thread. The schiffli machine is only limited by the length of thread that can fit on the bobbin.

Like the hand embroidery machine, early schiffli machines used a manually operated pantograph to trace a pattern and translate the location of each stitch. Later, a card reader was used to program the machine. The punch card, a concept borrowed from the Jacquard loom, recorded the end points of each stitch, as well as other functions that could be performed by the machine, e.g. stitching, boring, or advancing the material. The conversion of the design into a punch card was known as punching.

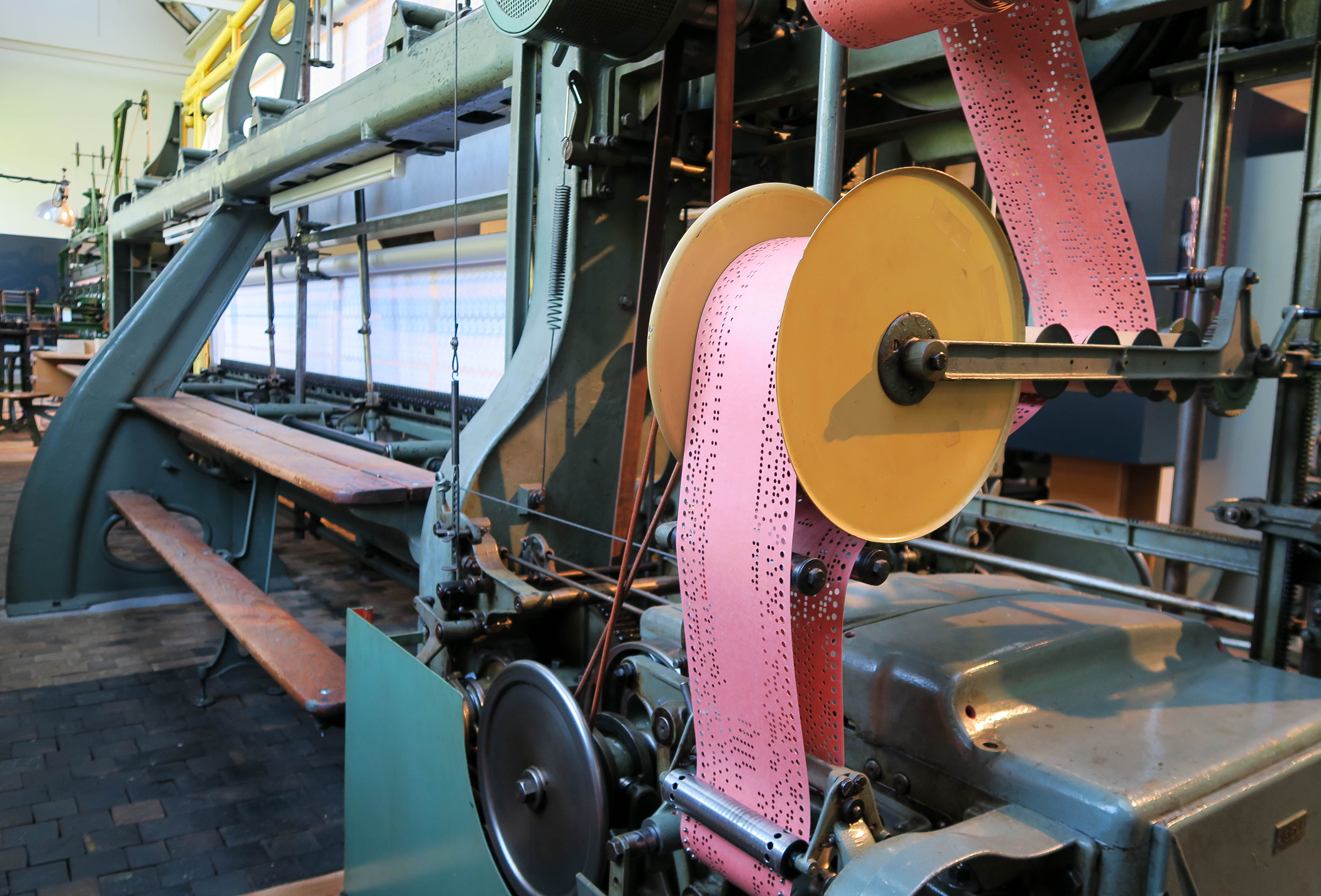
Card reader fully automated schiffli embroidery machine by Saurer

Needle spacing, or pitch, limited the width of the embroidered design. The spacing between the needles is known as rapport. The unit for measuring spacing was the French inch (1.08 English inch). Standard spacing was known as 4/4 rapport. Machines with 3/4, 4/4, and 6/4 were typical. Theses machines had 342, 228, and 156 needles per row. Wider needle spacing and thus larger designs could be produced by removing some of the needles. This was known as 6/4, 12/4, or 16/4 rapport.

== History ==
The first schiffli embroidery machine was invented in 1863 by Isaak Gröbli (1822–1917). He developed a prototype at Benninger AG in the municipality of Uzwil, Switzerland. In 1864, J.J. Rieter helped to further develop the invention in Winterthur. Gröbli and Rieter then spent several years improving the machine. The first practical machines were made available in 1868. However, the machine's full potential was not realized until the beginning of the 1870s. In 1875 the first international deliveries were made to Glasgow, and then in 1876 to New York. By 1880, Rieter had sold more than 300 Schiffli embroidery machines. By then, Saurer in Arbon and Martini in Frauenfeld, Switzerland began to compete. The German machine manufacturers J.C. & H. Dietrich in Plauen (later known as the Vogtländische Maschinenfabrik AG, or VOMAG) and the Maschinenfabrik Kappel AG located in Chemnitz-Kappel also began building machines. All of these companies competed for business in the textile industry that was centered in eastern Switzerland and in particular St. Gallen.

In 1898 Joseph Arnold Gröbli (1850–1939), the eldest son of Isaak Gröbli, developed the fully automated embroidery machine. The pantograph and thus the operator were replaced by a punch card reader. Robert Zahn is credited with adapting the punch card concept for VOMAG. VOMAG's card reader was known as the Automat, or the Zahn system. Saurer also added a punch card reader in 1912–1914. The mechanization of the embroidery machine was now complete and the fate of the hand machine was sealed. However, since preparing a punched tape was relatively expensive, hand machine embroidery continued to fill a niche - especially for small batch embroidery.

Even before 1900, Saurer was able to build and sell very large numbers of schiffli machines. In 1910, there were 4,862 schiffli embroidery machines in operation in Switzerland. By comparison, there were 15,671 hand embroidery machines were still in operation. However hand machines were clearly in decline after 1890. Schiffli machines were also used to create certain types of lace. Broderie anglaise is created using embroidery and a boring tool. So called chemical lace (German: Ätzspitze) is embroidered onto a type of fabric, a foundation, that is later dissolved. Plauen, Germany was well known for its machine lace industry. A different machine, the lace machine, was used to produce other types of lace. U.S. industrialists saw the potential for domestic embroidery manufacturing. In early 1900s schiffli machines were imported and many Swiss immigrated from the canton of St. Gallen to Hudson County, New Jersey and helped establish the industry there.

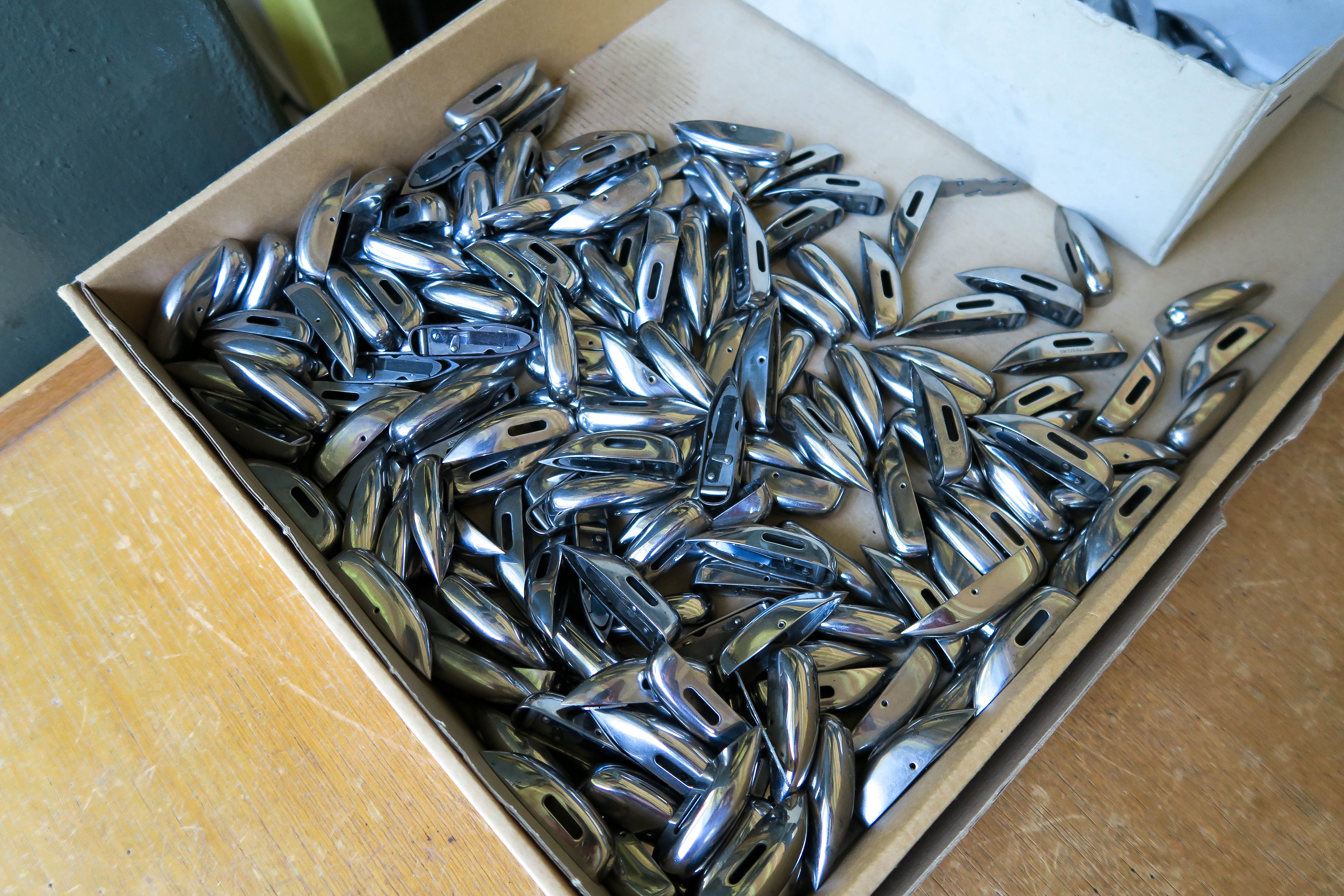
Schiffli bobbin thread holders

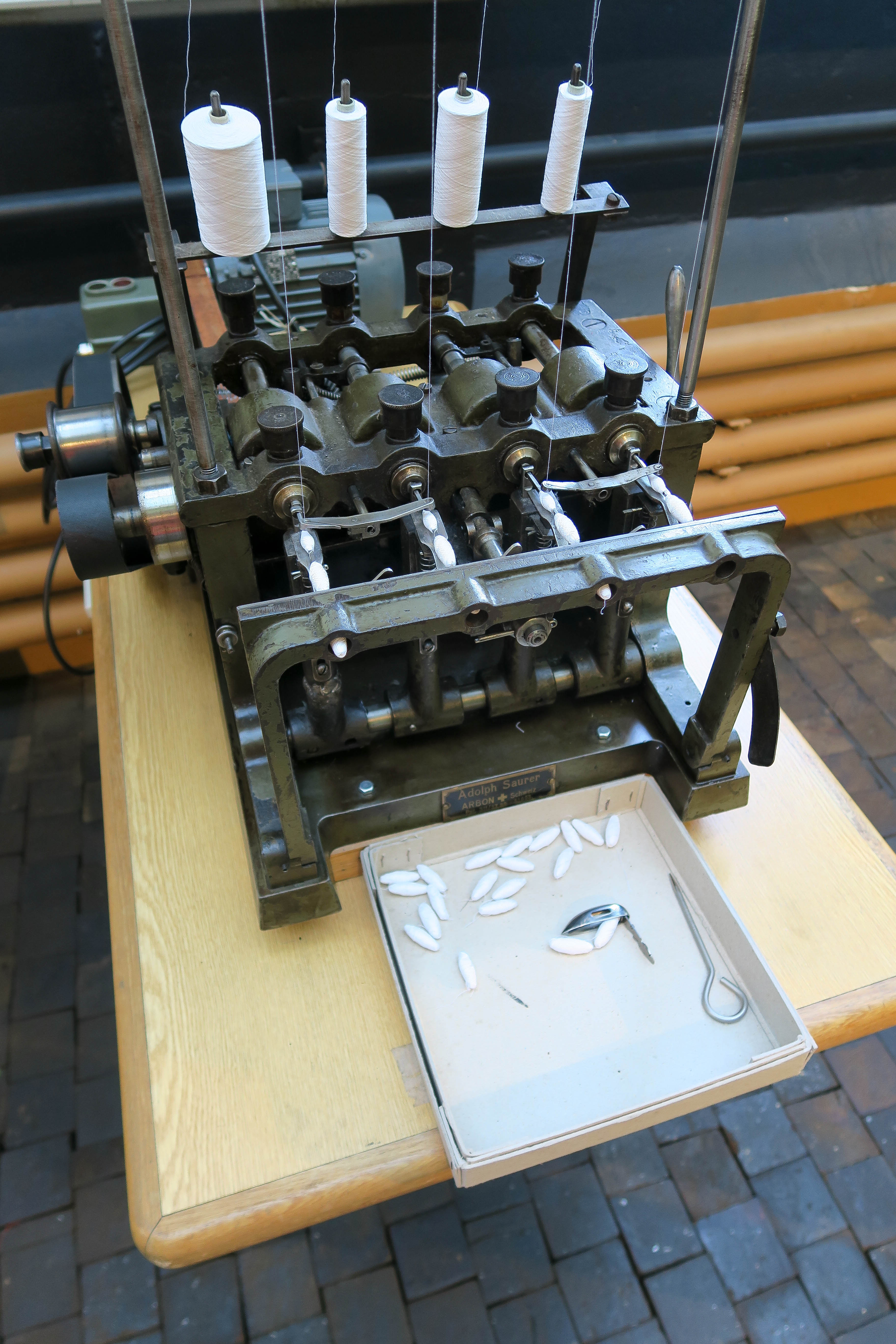
Schiffli bobbin thread winding machine

The period between 1890 and 1910 is regarded as the heyday of St. Gallen embroidery. Many embroidery factories were operating near St. Gallen during this period. Compared to manual embroidery machines, which were used in homes as part of a Swiss cottage industry, schiffli machines were relatively expensive and required greater outside capital. Initially hand machine embroidery had better quality. Manual machine operators or "stitchers," who previously controlled the placement of each stitch and powered their machines by hand, were reluctant to embrace the newer machines and even feared that it would replace them. Eventually the quality of schiffli embroidery improved. Automated machines were much more efficient than manually operated machines.

Since the craft of stitching was learned on the job and passed from one generation to the next - many of the operational details are obscure, or have yet to be translated from German. Coleman Schneider’s Machine Made Embroideries gives a detailed history of the machines in English. He explains basic machine operation, describes many of the stitches and techniques used, and describes the textiles and yarns that were used. It provides details about design, card punching and the various manufacturer's punch card formats. It explains the roles of the operators and includes a glossary of relevant terminology. His later book, The Art of Embroidery: In the 90's, includes a revised history of schiffli machines. It discusses the evolution of the automat from the pantograph to mechanical, to hydraulic, to electronic. A large portion of the book describes various Schiffli machines that evolved from the Plauen design.

Schneider, who lived and worked in NJ, documented the embroidery industry that existed in Hudson County, during the first half of the twentieth century. The region included yarn and fabric producers, textile bleachers and etchers, designers, as well as dealers and mechanics that supported the machines. It was close to shipping and New York City’s fashion industry. The businessman Robert Reiner, who imported VOMAG machines from Germany, was considered to be influential in developing the machine embroidery industry in Hudson County. Schneider describes how business was cyclical, always dependent on fashion, but also how demand for items such as embroidered patches, known as emblems, spiked during the first and second world wars.

Several examples of the early embroidery machines have been preserved in various museums. Functioning embroidery machines can be seen at the Schaustickerei in Plauen, Germany, Industriekultur museum in Neuthal, Switzerland, and the Textile Museum in St. Gallen. The Saurer museum in Arbon, Switzerland has both manual and the later schiffli machines as well as the associated needle threading, bobbin winding, card punching and card duplicating machines. The schiffli machine is still in use today. It has evolved, but its basic form is still recognizable. Saurer is still a leading manufacturer of schiffli embroidery machines. Paper punch cards have since been replaced by a computer. The punching process is now called digitizing.

A VOMAG catalog published in 1912 boasted they had delivered 13,000 embroidery machines: the first thousand in 11 years; the last thousand in 7 months. They employed 3600 experienced engineers and workman. At that time they were the second largest machine builders in Saxony. Images show the boiler room, 275 HP steam engine, and 500 and 1000 HP turbines for generating power. The factory included machine development, an iron foundry, casting shop, machine shop, and shops for assembling shuttle embroidery machines and Jacquard systems. The factory even had a private fire brigade. The table below summarizes the various models that were available in 1912. The catalog also includes images of several large factory installations near Plauen and St. Gallen.

		Hand Machines			Shuttle Embroidery Machines (with pantograph or automatic)			Punching Machines	
Model		2 rows	3 rows	HG	NG	NG	ZG	NG-PZ	PK-PZ
Embroidery length	Yards	5	5	5	5	10	10	21/3	1/3
Embroidery length	Meters	4.5	4.5	4.5	4.5	9.15	9.15	2.25	.35
Embroidery span	cm	28	24	34	52 60	50	62	50	50
Number of needles	6/4	224	336	224	228	456	456	116	9
Number of needles	4/4	336	504	-	340	682	682	172	13
Number of needles	3/4	446	669	-	452	908	908	228	17
Absolute length	m	6.25	6.25	6.75	7.5	12.20 11.85	12.30 11.95	6.7	4.18
Absolute breadth	m	3.15	3.15	1.5	1.7	1.80	1.80	1.7	1.6
Height of shop	m	3.30	3.30	3.30	3.2-4.0	3.2-4.0	3.5-4.0	3.2-4.0	3.2-4.0
Motorial force required	HP	-	-	-	1/3	3/4	3/4	1/2	1/2
Net weight	kg	2200- 2300	2700- 2900	3400	4300- 4500	7800-8000 8500-8700	8200-8400 8900-9100	4100-4200	2200
