= Arun Kumar Bajaj =

Indian embroider

Arun Kumar Bajaj (born 2 June 1983), also known as Needle Man, is a machine embroidery artist. He hails from Patiala, India. Bajaj presented a thread painting to Indian prime minister Narendra Modi in January 2018. He has also created portraits of Shaheed Bhagat Singh, Jesus Christ, Guru Gobind Singh, Lord Krishna, Mother Teresa, and Chief Minister Parkash Singh Badal.

== Personal life ==
Arun is married to Sanjita Bajaj.
