= Embroidery Machine Museum, Plauen =

Museum in Plauen, Germany

Coordinates: 50°29′35″N 12°08′15″E

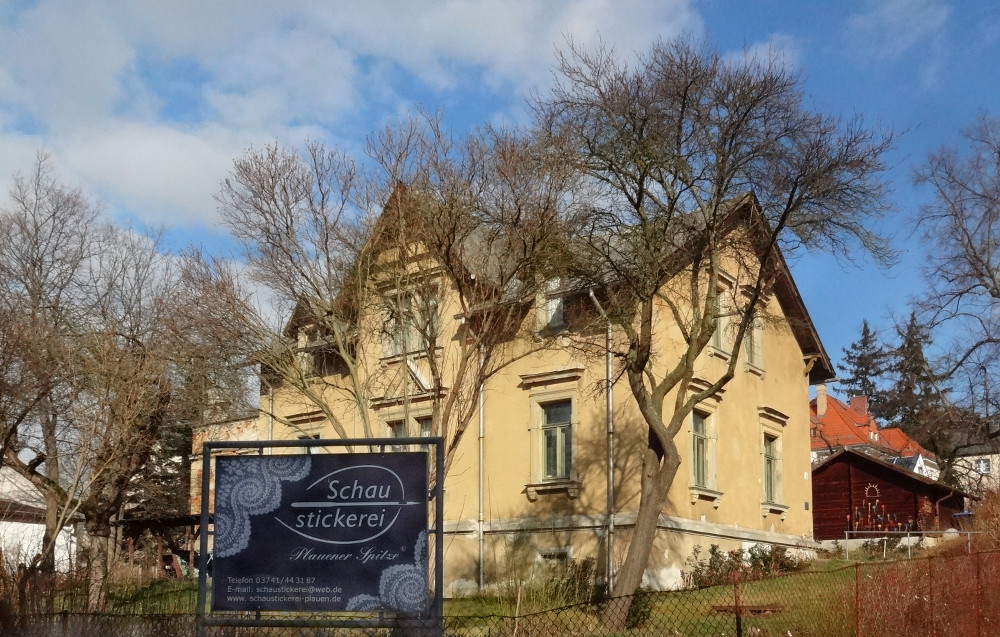
The Embroidery Machine Museum

Embroidery Machine Museum, Plauen, Saxony

The Embroidery Machine Museum has historical and regional importance in the City of Plauen, Germany. The exhibit is located in a small group of buildings consisting of a home and a small factory with original embroidery machines. Because of the historic and authentic nature of the structures and the originality of the machinery, this exhibit offers insight into Saxony textile industry as it existed in the late 1800s and early 1900s.

== History ==
In 1889 the embroidery entrepreneur, Max Vollstädt, built a house in an underdeveloped district of Plauen called Reusa. Until the turn of the century, it was used as a contract machine embroidery business. In 1902 during the boom in the Plauen embroidery industry, Vollstädt expanded his embroidery business. He ordered the construction of a one-story courtyard building to accommodate 10 shuttle embroidery machines. In keeping with the embroidery manufacturing methods developed during this time, he constructed his new building with windows, up-to-date layout, and transport lanes for the embroidery goods he produced. Over the following decades the ownership of this business changed hands several times, but the original intent of this business to produce embroidery remained the same, including the original home and work areas.

The embroidery production stopped in 1997, but the structures and the machinery were preserved. In December, the association “ Vogtländische Textilgeschichte Plauen e.V. “ took over the buildings and machines. Since then, the association runs the exhibit as a “functioning museum factory".

== Exhibitions ==
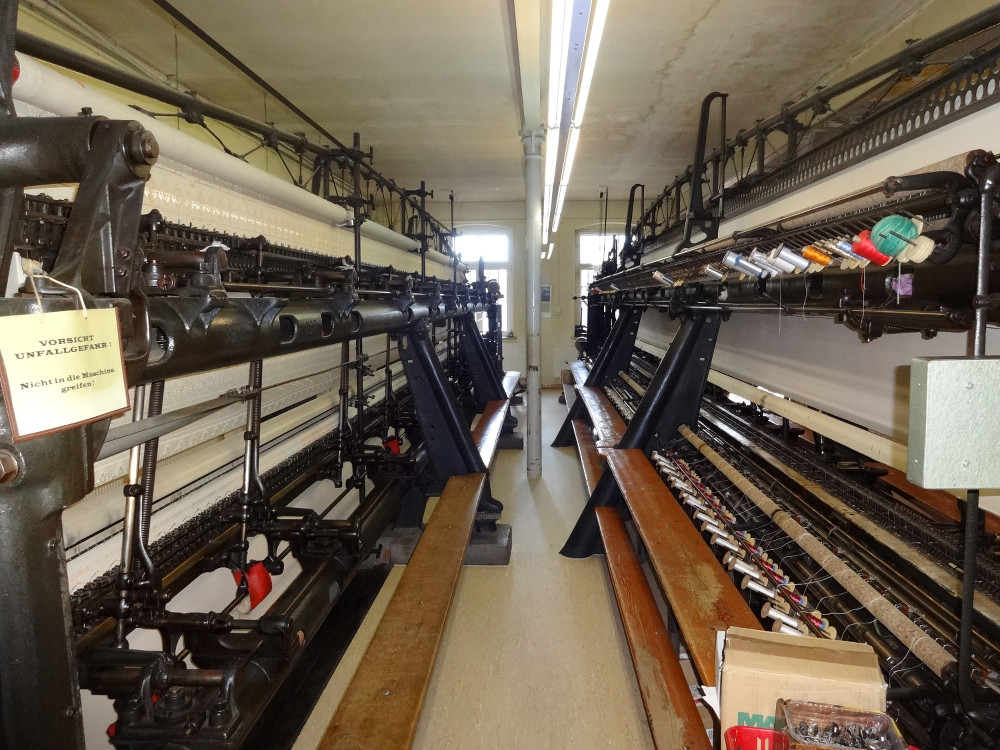
Shuttle embroidery machines

The permanent exhibition demonstrates the working processes and the conditions under which this historic embroidery operated. The running and maintenance of the machines, the various techniques employed, the type of embroidery goods produced, and the emergence of the world-famous Plauen lace (as a form of Chemical lace) are fully explained while touring this museum. The museum staff will discuss the role of the Vogtländische Maschinen Fabrik (VOMAG) which manufactured embroidery machines in Plauen from 1881 to approx. 1938. They will explain how this factory developed technical innovations for the embroidery industry under the directorship of Robert Zahn, at the time.

Together with their support organization, “Vogtländische Textilgeschichte Plauen e.V.”, the Museum offers embroidery exhibitions, lectures, and events on topics about industrial and textile history, fashion and design.

== Offers ==
The Embroidery Machine Museum offers unique embroidery and fashion items for sale in its museum shop. As part of the educational program, creative and educational courses are offered to children and teens. Participants study the regional textile history through assigned embroidery projects at the museum.
