= Walter Gröbli =

Swiss mathematician

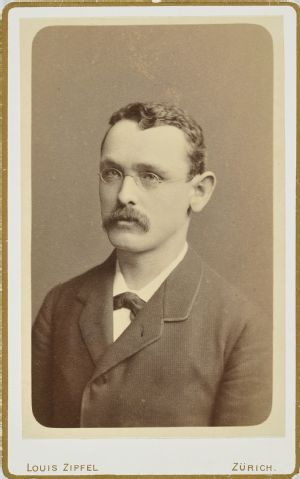
- Born: 23 September 1852; Oberuzwil, Switzerland
- Died: 26 June 1903 (aged 50); Piz Blas, Switzerland
- Education: ETH Zurich; University of Göttingen
- Spouse: Emma Bodmer
- Parent(s): Isaak Gröbli and Elisabetha Grob
- Scientific career
- Fields: Mathematics
- Workplaces: ETH Zurich
- Thesis: Specielle Probleme über die Bewegung geradliniger paralleler Wirbelfäden (1877)
- Doctoral advisor: Hermann Schwarz
- Doctoral students: Ernst Amberg

Walter Gröbli (23 September 1852 – 26 June 1903) was a Swiss mathematician.

== Life and work ==
His father, Issak Gröbli, was an industrial who was invented a shuttle embroidery machine in 1863, and his old brother is credited to have introduced the invention in the United States. Walter Gröbli was more interested in mathematics than in embroidery and he studied at the Polytechnicum of Zürich under Hermann Schwarz and Heinrich Martin Weber, from 1871 to 1875. Later, Gröbli studied at University of Berlin and University of Göttingen, the latter awarding him his doctorate (1877).

The following six years, Gröbli was assistant of Frobenius in Polytechnicum of Zürich. In 1883 he was elected mathematics professor in the Gymnasium of Zürich. Despite his mathematical talent he did not follow a research career, he was happy to be a schoolmaster.

His other main passion was mountaineering. He died with other three colleagues on a mountain accident climbing the Piz Blas.

The only known work of Gröbli was his doctoral thesis dissertation. It deals about three vortex motion, four vortex motion having an axis of symmetry and $2n$ vortex motion having $n$ symmetry axes. This work is considered classical in vortex dynamics literature.

== Bibliography ==
- Aref, Hassan; Rott, Nicholas; Thomann, Hans (1992). "Gröbli's Solution of the Three-Vortex Problem". Annual Review of Fluid Mechanics. 24: 1–21. Bibcode:1992AnRFM..24....1A. doi:10.1146/annurev.fl.24.010192.000245. ISSN 0066-4189.
- Eminger, Stefanie Ursula (2015). Carl Friedrich Geiser and Ferdinand Rudio: The Men Behind the First International Congress of Mathematicians (PDF). St. Andrews University.
- Meleshko, Vyacheslav V.; Aref, Hassan (2007). "A Bibliography of Vortex Dynamics". In Hassan Aref; Erik van der Giessen (eds.). Advances in Applied Mechanics, Volum 41. Elsevier. pp. 197–293. ISBN 978-0-12-002057-7.
