= Chemical lace =

Lace made using sacrificial fabric

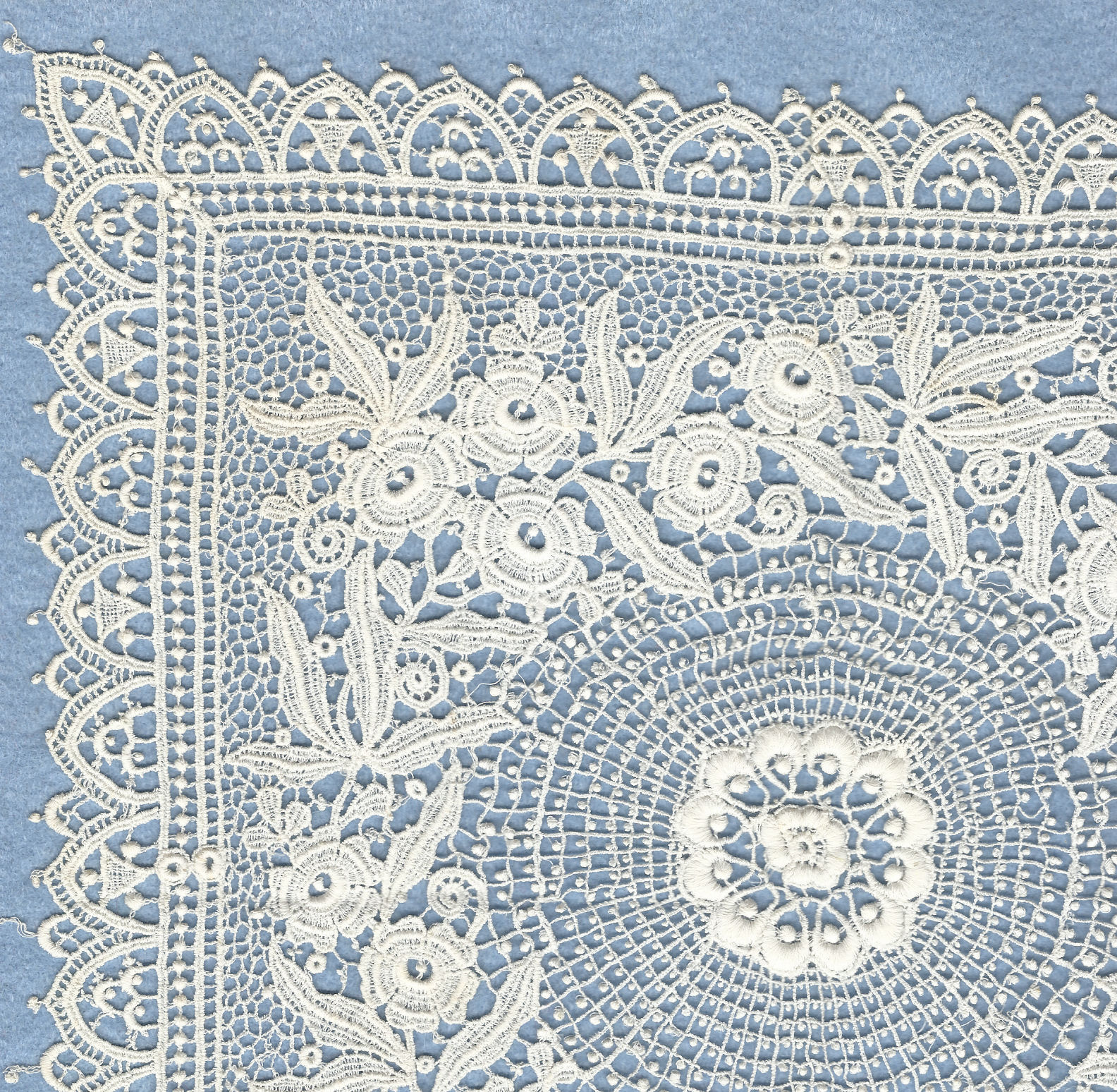
Chemical lace

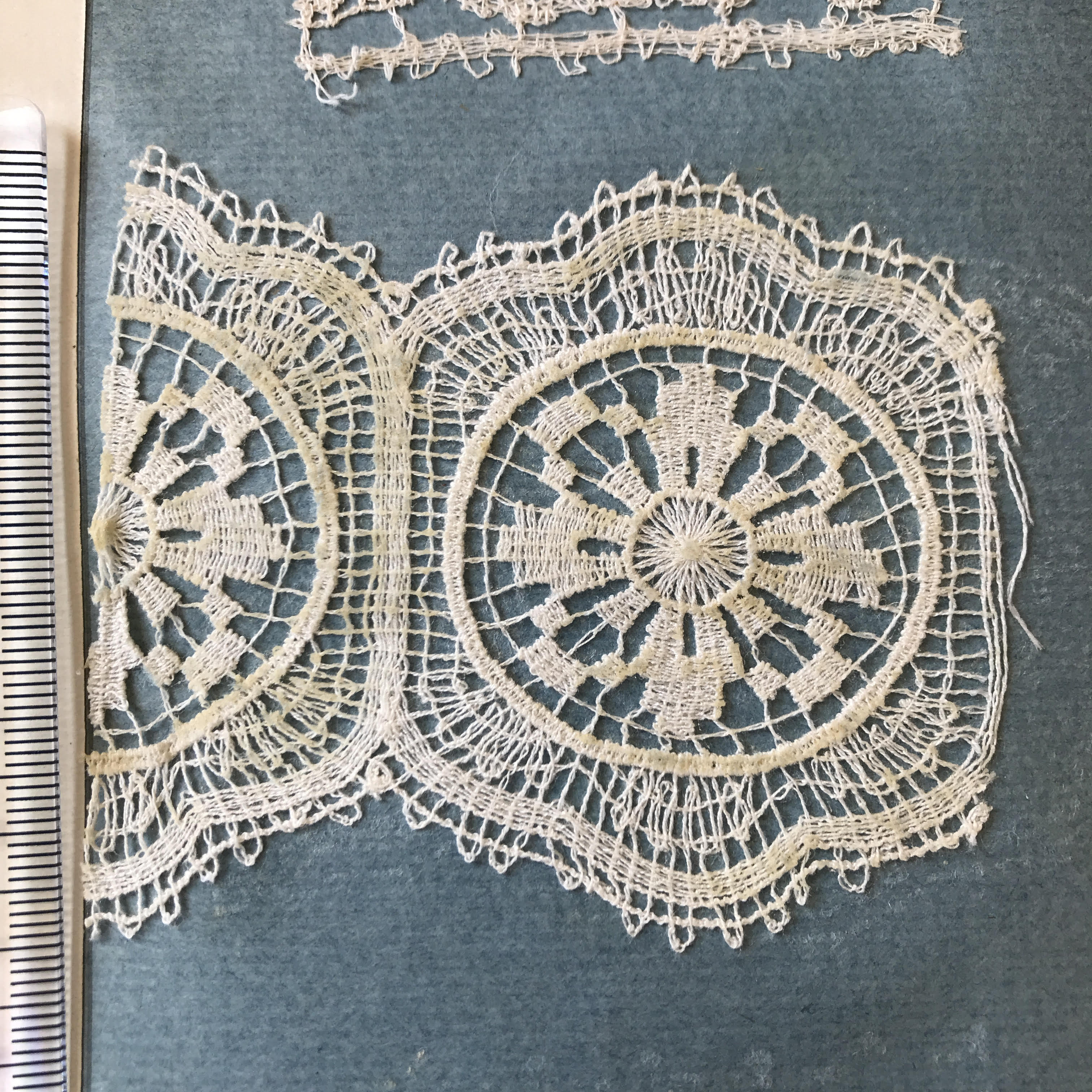
Teneriffe motif lace

Chemical lace (sometimes referred to as Schiffli lace) is a form of machine-made lace. This method of lace-making is done by embroidering a pattern on a sacrificial fabric that has been chemically treated so as to disintegrate after the pattern has been created. Schiffli machines came into use in the late 19th century. Before that, embroidery machines called Swiss hand machine were used to make chemical lace as well as embroideries. In modern production, the base fabric is typically made from a water-soluble or heat-sensitive material.

This embroidery is nowadays typically done on a multi-head or multi-needle Schiffli machine or loom that has a very large, continuous and overlapping embroidery field. The lace pattern is designed such that the embroidery thread creates an interlocking series of threads that will, in essence, become a "stand-alone" piece of lace.

After the embroidery is completed, the embroidered fabric is immersed in a solution that will not harm the embroidery thread but completely dissolves the sacrificial fabric leaving just the lace.

Utilizing these large machines and this technique, a single piece of lace could be, using today's state-of-the-art machines, over 60 inches wide by 15 yards long. In practice, this system is used to produce many smaller items with one setup.

Since the original development of chemical lace, other methods have been developed beyond the chemical washing method described above. These include the use of base fabrics that are water-soluble or that disintegrate under heat. These methods are generally too expensive or impractical for large-scale production. These are typically used by smaller embroidery facilities specializing in targeted markets, home-based businesses, or hobbyists.

Chemical lace can be distinguished from needle lace by a slight fuzziness in the threads.

Although chemical lace has historically been employed for decorative purposes, it has more recently been investigated for advanced applications, including surgical meshes and skin-integrated smart materials.
