= Machine embroidery =

Technique of embroidering with a sewing machine or purpose-made embroidering machine

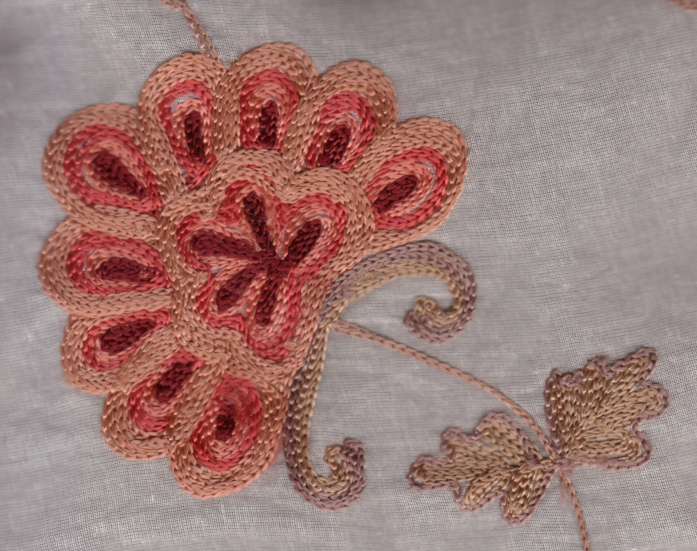
Commercial machine embroidery in chain stitch on a voile curtain, China, early 21st century

Machine embroidery is the process of using a sewing or embroidery machine to create decorative stitching on fabric. It is widely used in commercial branding, product decoration, uniform embellishment, and personal customization. Most modern embroidery machines are computer-controlled and rely on digitized embroidery files to execute designs.

The most common stitch types in machine embroidery include the running stitch (a simple line used for outlines or travel paths), the satin stitch (used for narrow, dense decorative elements and lettering), and the tatami stitch (also known as fill stitch, used to cover larger areas). To connect distant parts of a design, embroidery software generates connector stitches—short stitches that may be visible (as jump stitches) or hidden beneath other stitching. At the beginning and end of sections, lock stitches are often used to secure the threads and prevent unraveling.

Free-motion sewing machine embroidery uses a basic zigzag sewing machine and designs are made manually. Chenille embroidery is a decorative technique that uses a looped or tufted yarn to create a soft, velvety texture on fabric. It is typically done with a specialized chenille embroidery machine, where a chain stitch needle and a loop-pile mechanism form raised loops on the surface. This style is often used for varsity letters, patches, and textured logos on apparel.

== History ==
Before computers were affordable, most machine embroidery was completed by punching designs on paper tape that then ran through an embroidery machine. One error could ruin an entire design, forcing the creator to start over.

Machine embroidery dates back to 1964 when Tajima started to manufacture and sell TAJIMA Multi-head Automatic Embroidery machines. In 1973, Tajima introduced the TMB Series 6-needle (6 colors) full-automatic color-change embroidery machine. In 1978, Tajima started manufacturing the TMBE Series Bridge Type Automatic Embroidery machines. These machines introduced electronic 6-needle automatic color change technology.

In 1980 the first computerized embroidery machines were introduced to the home market. Wilcom introduced the first computer graphics embroidery design system to run on a minicomputer. Melco, an international distribution network formed by Randal Melton and Bill Childs, created the first embroidery sample head for use with large Schiffli looms. These looms spanned several feet across and produced lace patches and large embroidery patterns. The sample head allowed embroiderers to avoid manually sewing the design sample and saved production time. Subsequently, it became the first computerized embroidery machine marketed to home sewers.

The economic policy of the Reagan presidency helped propel Melco to the top of the market. At the Show of the Americas in 1980, Melco unveiled the Digitrac, a digitizing system for embroidery machines. The digitized design was composed at six times the size of the embroidered final product. The Digitrac consisted of a small computer, mounted on an X and Y axis on a large whiteboard. It sold for $30,000. The original single-needle sample head sold for $10,000 and included a 1" paper-tape reader and 2 fonts. The digitizer marked common points in the design to create elaborate fill and satin stitch combinations.

In 1982, Tajima introduced the world's first electronic chenille embroidery machine, called the TMCE Series Multi-head Electronic Chenille Embroidery Machine. In the same year, they developed the automatic frame changer, a dedicated apparatus for rolled textile embroidery. Also in 1982, Pulse Microsystems introduced Stitchworks, the first PC based embroidery software, and the first software based on outlines rather than stitches. This was monumental to decorators, in that it allowed them to scale and change the properties and parts of their designs easily, on the computer. Designs were output to paper tape, which was read by the embroidery machine. Stitchworks was sold worldwide by Macpherson.

Melco patented the ability to sew circles with a satin stitch, as well as arched lettering generated from a keyboard. An operator digitized the design using similar techniques to punching, transferring the results to a 1" paper tape or later to a floppy disk. This design would then be run on the embroidery machine, which stitched out the pattern. Wilcom enhanced this technology in 1982 with the introduction of the first multi-user system, which allowed more than one person to work on the embroidery process, streamlining production times.

In 1983, Tajima created the TMLE Series Multi-Head Electronic Lock Stitch Chenille Embroidery machine, followed by the TMEF Series 9-needle Type Electronic Embroidery Machine in 1984. In 1986, Tajima introduced the world's first sequin embroidery machine, enabling designers to combine sequin embroidery with plain embroidery.

In 1987, Pulse Microsystems introduced a digital asset management application called DDS, which was a design librarian for embroidery machines. This made it more efficient for machine operators to access their designs. In 1988 Tajima designed the TMLE-D5 series embroidery machines, with a pair arrangement of lock-stitch-handle embroidery heads, which were capable of sewing multiple threads.

Brother Industries entered the embroidery industry after several computerized embroidery companies contracted it to provide sewing heads. Pulse Microsystems developed software for them called PG1. PG1 had tight integration with the embroidery machine using high-level protocol, enabling the machine to pull designs from software, rather than having the software push designs to the machine. This approach is still used today. Melco was acquired by Saurer in 1989.

In the 1990s, Wilcom introduced its EmbroideryStudio software line along with the .EMB file format, which became one of the industry's native formats for storing complete embroidery design data.

Tajima introduced a 12 needle machine into their series along with a noise reduction mechanism.

In 1995, Tajima added a multi-color (6-color) type to chenille embroidery machines and announced the ability to mix embroidery machines with plain chenille embroidery. They also began sales of the TLFD Series Laser-cut Embroidery Machines. In 1996, Pulse Microsystems introduced the computational geometry-based simulation of hand-created chenille using a spiral effect. Following this in 1997, Tajima introduced 15-needle machines, in response to the "multi-color-age".

In the late 1990s, Pulse Microsystems introduced networking to embroidery machines. It added a box, which allowed them to network and then pulls designs from a central server. It also provided machine feedback and allowed machines to be optically isolated to protect machines in an industrial environment. Since then, computerized machine embroidery has grown in popularity as costs have fallen for computers, software, and embroidery machines.

In the year 2000, Pulse Microsystems introduced Stitchport, which is a server-based embroidery engine for embroidery in a browser. This allowed for the factory automation of letter creation. Although they were not yet ready for it, this transformed the apparel industry by allowing manufacturers, stores, and end-users access to customized versions of the mass-produced garments and goods they had been buying throughout their lives, with no margin of error.

In 2001, Tajima created heater-wire sewing machines, which were innovative, combination machines.

In an environment that was finally ready for the individuality that mass customization allowed, the principles developed for Stitchport were adapted in 2008 for the creation of PulseID. PulseID allows for the automation of personalization, even on the largest industrial scale.

In 2008, Wilcom's EmbroideryStudio was integrated with CorelDRAW Graphics Suite to add general-purpose vector illustration tools alongside digitizing.

In 2013, Tajima released the TMAR-KC Series Multi-Head Embroidery Machine, equipped with a digitally controlled presser foot.

In 2016, Wilcom launched Hatch Embroidery, software designed specifically for the hobby and small business sector, offering commercial quality software without the commercial price-tag.

In 2017, Wilcom released EmbroideryStudio e4, a professional multi-decoration suite for commercial digitizers and embroidery shops, adding features such as integrated job-ordering and design-library tools.

The major embroidery machine companies and software developers are continuing to adapt their commercial systems to market them for home use, including Janome, RNK, Floriani, Tacony Corporation and many more. As costs have fallen for computers, software and home market embroidery machines, the popularity of machine embroidery as a hobby has risen, and as such, many machine manufacturers sell their own lines of embroidery patterns. In addition, many individuals and independent companies also sell embroidery designs, and there are free designs available on the internet.

== Types of machine embroidery ==
=== Free-motion machine embroidery ===
In free-motion machine embroidery, embroidered designs are created by using a basic zigzag sewing machine. As this type of machine is used primarily for tailoring, it lacks the automated features of a specialized machine. The first zigzag sewing machine was patented by Helen Blanchard. To create free-motion machine embroidery, the embroiderer runs the machine and skillfully moves tightly hooped fabric under the needle to create a design. The "feed dogs" or machine teeth are lowered or covered, and the embroiderer moves the fabric manually. The embroiderer develops the embroidery manually, using the machine's settings for running stitch and fancier built-in stitches. A machine's zigzag stitch can create thicker lines within a design or be used to create a border. As this is a manual process rather than a digital reproduction, any pattern created using free-motion machine embroidery is unique and cannot be exactly reproduced, unlike with computerized embroidery.

=== Cornely hand-guided embroidery ===
This embroidery inherited the name of the Cornely machine. Created in the 19th century to imitate the Beauvais stitch (chain stitch), it is still used today, especially in the fashion industry. Cornely embroidery is a so-called hand-guided embroidery. The operator directs their machine according to the pattern. The fabric is moved by a crank located under the machine. The Cornely also has a universal drive system controlled by a handle. Some models can embroider sequins, cords, braids, etc. There are also Cornely machines performing a classic straight stitch.

=== Computerized machine embroidery ===
Most modern embroidery machines are computer controlled and specifically engineered for embroidery. Industrial and commercial embroidery machines and combination sewing-embroidery machines have a hooping or framing system that holds the framed area of fabric taut under the sewing needle and moves it automatically to create a design from a pre-programmed digital embroidery pattern.

Depending on its capabilities, the machine will require varying degrees of user input to read and sew embroidery designs. Sewing-embroidery machines generally have only one needle and require the user to change thread colors during the embroidery process. Multi-needle industrial machines are generally threaded prior to running the design and do not require re-threading. These machines require the user to input the correct color change sequence before beginning to embroider. Some can trim and change colors automatically.

== The computerized machine embroidery process ==
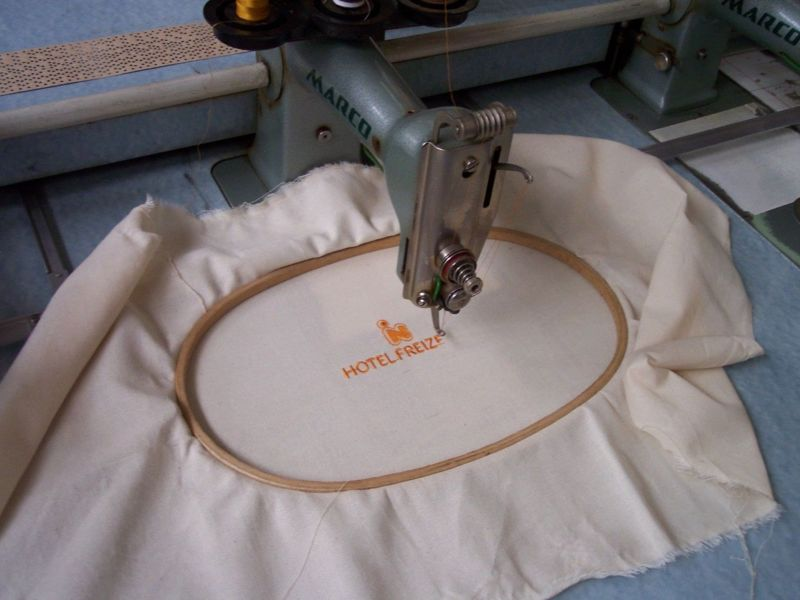
Machine embroidery in progress

Machine embroidery is a multi-step process with many variables that impact the quality of the final product, including the type of fabric to be embellished, design size, stabilizer choice and type of thread utilized. The basic steps for creating embroidery with a computerized embroidery machine are as follows:

- Create an embroidery design file or purchase a stitchable machine embroidery file. Creation may take hours depending on the complexity of the design, and the software can be costly.
- Edit the design and/or combine with other designs.
- Export the design file to a (proprietary machine) embroidery file that mostly just contains commands for the embroidery machine. If you bought such a file, you may have to convert the file.
- Load the embroidery file into the embroidery machine, making sure it is the correct format for the machine and that the stitched design will fit in the appropriate hoop.
- Determine and mark the location of embroidery placement on the fabric to be embellished.
- Secure the fabric in a hoop with the appropriate stabilizer, and place it on the machine.
- Center the needle over the start point of the design.
- Start and monitor the embroidery machine, watching for errors and issues. Troubleshoot any problems as they arise. The operator should have plenty of needles, bobbins, a can of air (or small air compressor), a small brush, and scissors.
- Remove the completed design from machine. Separate the fabric from the hoop and trim the stabilizer, loose threads, etc.

== Types of computerized embroidery ==
- Single-head embroidery machines:
  - Standard single head: Used by for startups, home-based businesses, and small shops. These machines often come with features such as USB connectivity, built-in designs, and automatic thread trimming. Models range from entry-level to advanced, offering different embroidery areas and stitch speeds.
  - Sequin single head: Besides standard embroidery, these machines incorporate sequins into designs. Advanced models may offer dual sequin capabilities, allowing for multiple sequin sizes and colors.
  - Cording single head: These machines can embroider with cord-like materials, adding a textured, 3D effect to designs. They are used in high-fashion garments, home décor, and accessories. Some models also combine cording with standard embroidery features.
- Multi-head embroidery machines:
  - 2 to 6 head machines: Suitable for small to medium-sized businesses. These machines allow multiple items to be embroidered simultaneously. They often come with features such as automatic color change, thread break detection, and high-speed stitching.
  - 12 to 20 head machines: Designed for large-scale industrial production. These machines handle high-volume orders and complex designs. Advanced features include large memory capacity for design storage, network connectivity for streamlined operations, and robust build quality for continuous operation.
- Specialized embroidery machines:
  - Sequin embroidery machines: Designed for adding sequins. They can handle various sequin sizes and colors, often used in fashion, dance costumes, and decorative items. Some models offer mixed media capabilities, combining sequin, cording, and standard embroidery in one machine.
  - Chenille embroidery machines: Create textured chenille designs, popular in varsity jackets and patches. These machines are built to handle heavy-duty fabrics and large designs.
  - Laser cutting embroidery machines: Combine laser cutting with embroidery, enabling intricate cutwork and appliqué designs. Ideal for detailed and high-precision work, commonly used in high-end fashion and custom apparel.
- Combination embroidery machines:
  - Embroidery and sewing machines: Machines that offer both sewing and embroidery functions. They come with a variety of built-in stitches, embroidery designs, and customization options.
  - Embroidery and quilting machines: Offer quilting and embroidery capabilities. Features include large embroidery areas, quilting stitches, and specialized quilting hoops.
- Industrial embroidery machines:
  - High-speed machines: Can reach high stitch speeds, useful for large production runs. They come with features like robust frames, large thread capacity, and enhanced durability.
  - Automatic color change machines: Equipped with automatic color-changing mechanisms. These machines are suitable for complex, multi-color designs.
- Tubular and flat embroidery machines:
  - Tubular embroidery machines: Designed for embroidering tubular items such as caps, sleeves, and bags. They often come with specialized hoops and cap frames.
  - Flat embroidery machines: Designed for flat items like fabric rolls, sheets, and large panels. They provide a large embroidery area and are used in home décor, large garments, and banners.
- Portable and compact embroidery machines:
  - Portable embroidery machines: Lightweight machines that offer basic to advanced features.
  - Compact embroidery machines: Designed for small workspaces and offer a range of features from basic to advanced embroidery capabilities.

== List of machine embroidery design file extensions ==
File Type/Extension	Company/Machine compatibility	References
.10o	Toyota	
.ART	Bernina artista	
.ASD	Melco	
.CND	Melco condensed	
.CSD	POEM, Singer EU, Viking Huskygram	
.CXM	Proel TSI, Millennium X	
.DAT	Barudan FMC	
.DST	Tajima, Brother, Barudan, Babylock, Melco, Galaxy, BAi	
.DSB	Tajima, Barudan, BAi	
.DSZ	Tajima ZSK	
.DHS	Dahao Stitchmax	
.EMB	Wilcom, EmbroideryStudio, Hatch Embroidery	
.EMD	Elna Expressive	
.EMG / .EMG2 / .EMG3	GMI, Stilista	
.EXP	Melco Expanded, Bernina	
.FDR	Barudan FDR	
.FHE	SINGER (Futura)	
.FMC	Barudan FMC	
.GNC	Great Notions Condensed	
.HUS	Husqvarna Viking	
.JEF/.JEF+	Janome, New Home	
.KSM	PFAFF	
.M3	Juki B	
.OEF	OESD Condensed	
.OFM	Melco	
.PCD, .PCS, .PCQ	PFAFF	
.PEC, .PEL, .PEM, .PES	Baby Lock, Bernina Deco, Brother, Simplicity, Melco	
.PHB, .PHC	Baby Lock, Bernina Deco, Brother	
.PMU	Proel, ProWin (Proel TSI)	
.PUM	Proel, ProFlex (Proel TSI)	
.SEW	Elna, Janome, New Home, Kenmore	
.SHV	Husqvarna Viking	
.SST	Sunstar	
.STX	Stitchmax	
.STI	Toyota/Data Stitch	
.STX	Toyota/Data Stitch	
.TBF, .TCF	Tajima	
.U01	Barudan	
.VIP	VIP Customizing	
.VP3	PFAFF, Husqvarna Viking	
.DST	CBL EMBROIDERY MACHINE	
