= Slip (needlework) =

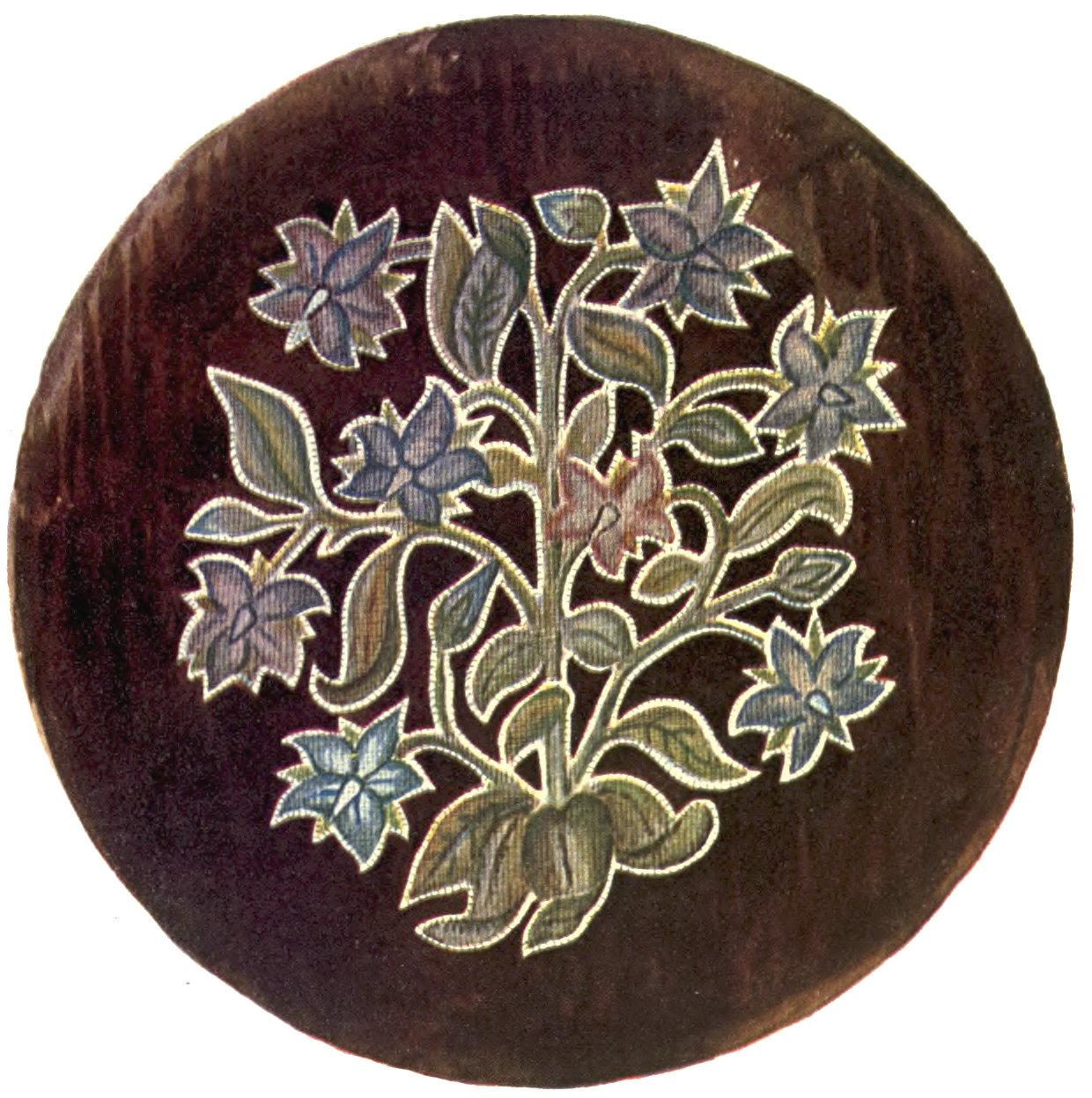
Illustration of a stool cover with a slip of borage worked in tent stitch on canvas and then applied to a velvet ground, Hardwick Hall, early 17th century.

In needlework, a slip is a design representing a cutting or specimen of a plant, usually with flowers or fruit and leaves on a stem. Most often, slip refers to a plant design stitched in canvaswork (pettipoint), cut out, and applied to a woven background fabric. By extension, slip may also mean any embroidered or canvaswork motif, floral or not, mounted to fabric in this way.

Isolated motifs arranged in rows are common in English embroidery from the 14th to the 17th centuries, and small floral slips were the most popular.

== Technique and inspiration ==
The name slip as used in needlework derives from the horticultural sense, where it describes a cutting of a plant used for grafting.

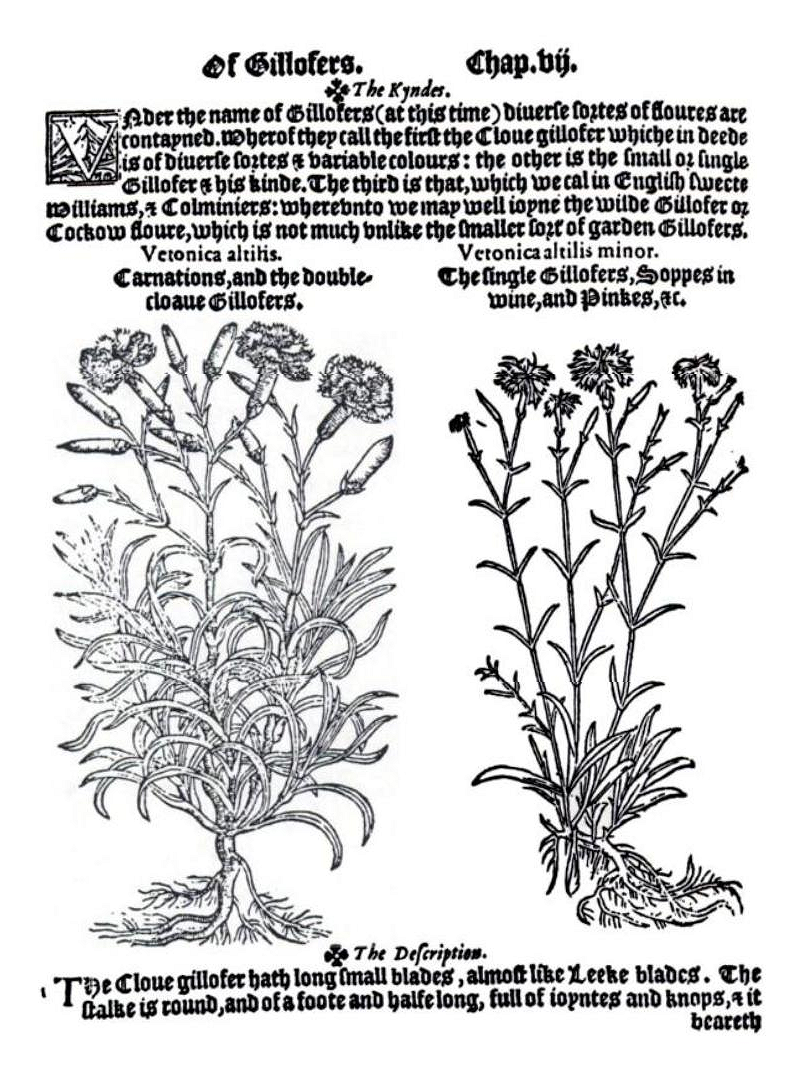
Slips of gillofers (gillyflowers, that is, carnations and pinks), from A niewe Herball by Henry Lyte, 1578.

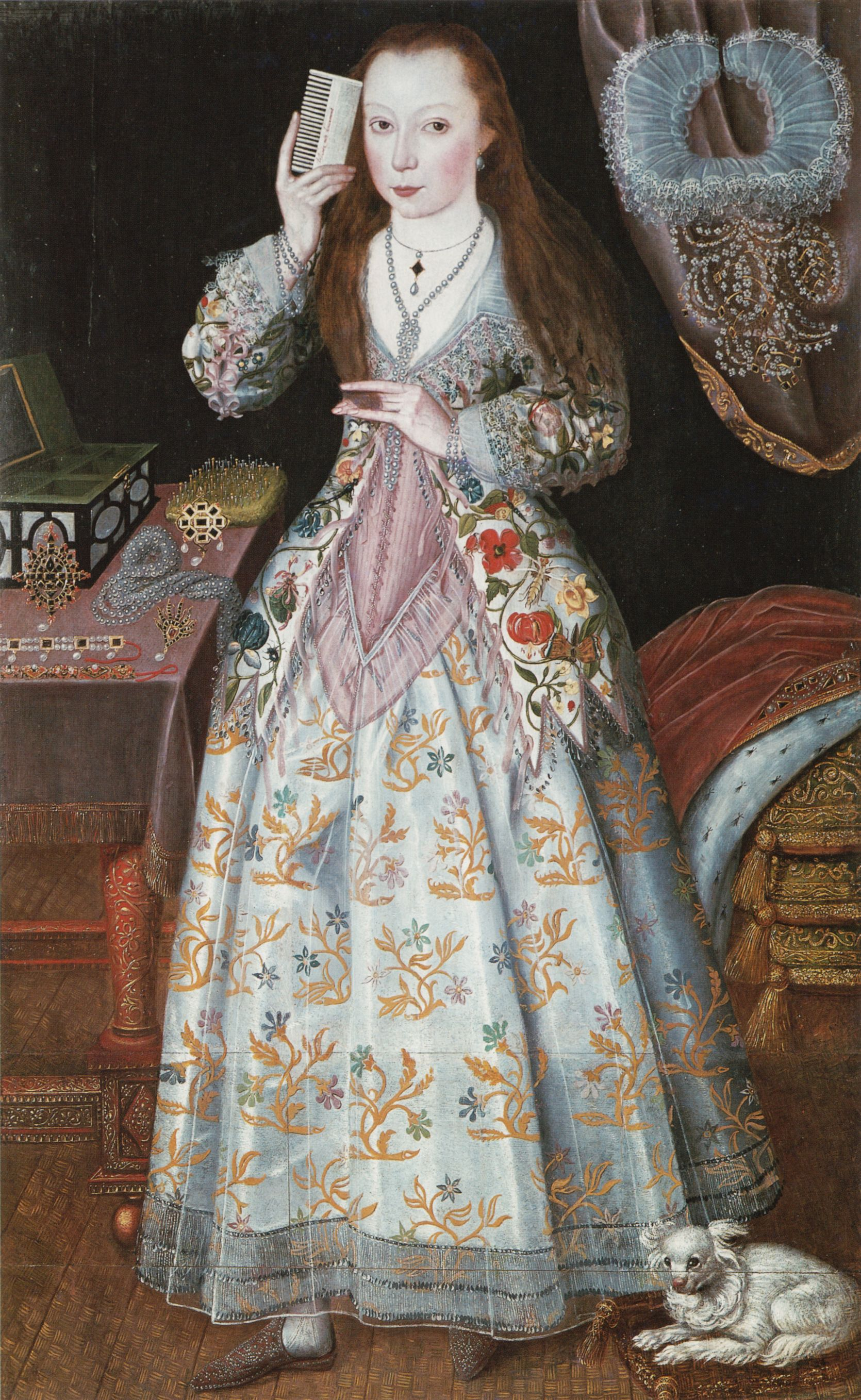
Elizabeth Vernon wearing a petticoat with slips of embroidery.

Canvaswork floral slips and other motifs appliquéd to a woven background fabric such as velvet or damask became common in England from the mid-14th century, replacing the all-over embroidery of Opus Anglicanum. These were worked with silk thread in tent stitch on linen canvas, cut out, and applied to the ground fabric, often with an outline and embellishments of couched thread or cord or other embroidery. Slips were also appliquéd of rich fabrics on plainer ones, similarly detailed with couched cord and embroidery. This style of decoration is characteristic of later medieval ecclesiastical embroidery (and probably of domestic embroidery as well, although little of this survives). Following the dissolution of the monasteries during the English Reformation, rich vestments were cut up and the fabrics and motifs reused to make secular furnishings. Appliquéd slips of both old fabric and new canvaswork are characteristic of domestic textiles such as chair covers, cushions, and especially wall hangings and bed curtains throughout the Elizabethan and Jacobean eras.

Elizabethan slips were based on the woodcut illustrations in herbals and flower paintings, such as Jacques Le Moyne's La Clef de Champs, William Turner's A New Herball (published in three parts, 1551-1568), Henry Lyte's A niewe Herball (1578), and John Gerard's Great Herbal (1597), and were intentionally naturalistic. Slip motifs are also seen in blackwork embroidery, worked in silk, and in Jacobean embroidery and crewel embroidery in silk and wool.

As a New Year's Day gift to Anne of Denmark in January 1619, Lady Anne Clifford sent a cushion of cloth of silver, embroidered with the royal arms of Denmark, and decorated with "slips of tent stitch". The cushion may have intended to complement a cloth of silver bed with the Danish arms owned by the Queen.

By the first quarter of the 17th century, simpler designs for slips were being published in books of patterns specifically for embroidery, like Richard Shorleyker's A Scholehouse for the Needle (1632).
