= Plainweave =

Category of woven fabrics

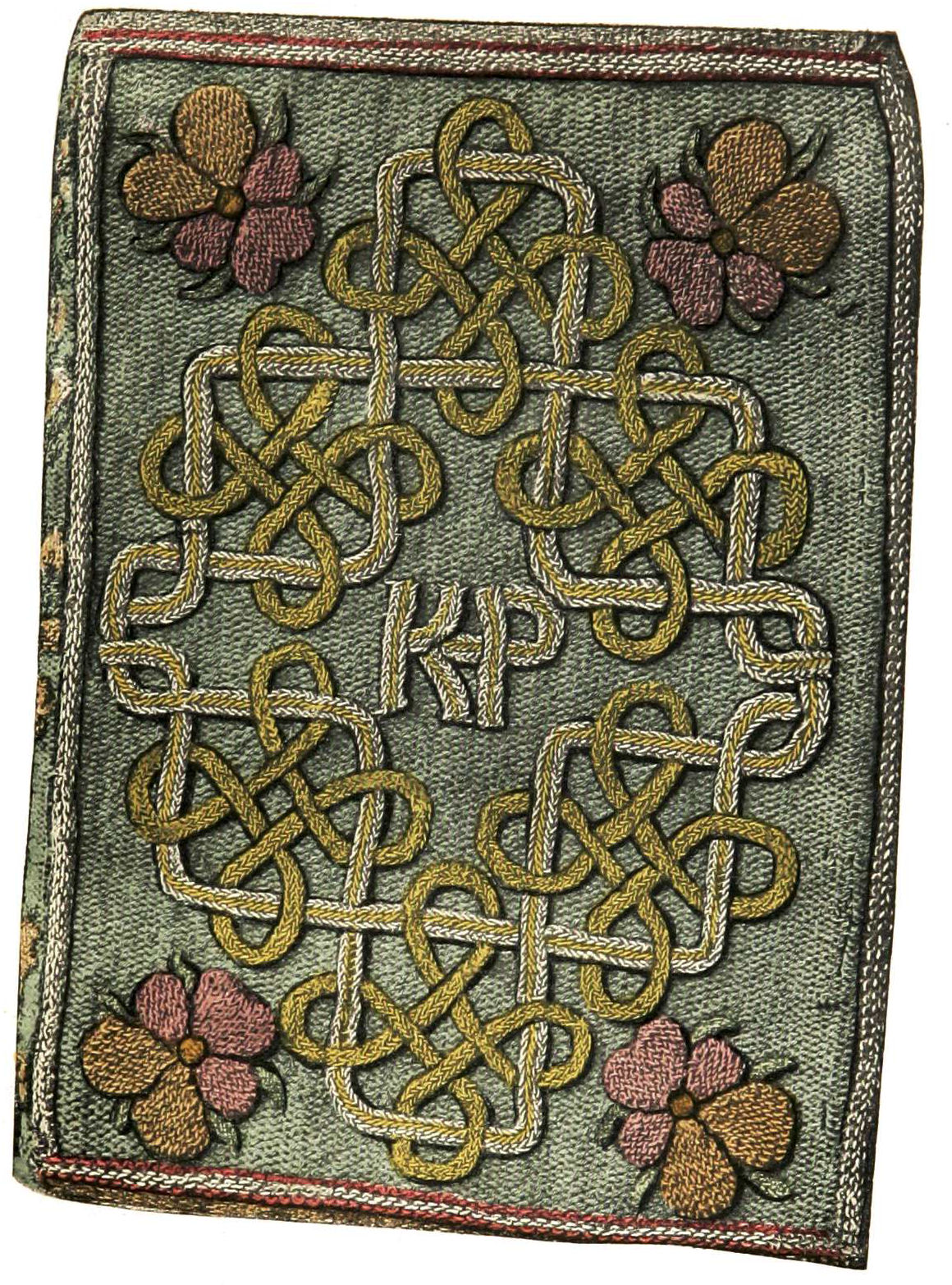
Embroidered bookbinding on plainweave fabric. Executed by Elizabeth I of England at age 11 in 1544.

In embroidery, plainweave is a technical category of woven base fabrics that are suitable for working certain varieties of embroidery. Plainweave fabrics have a tight weave and individual threads are not readily visible. Surface embroidery may be performed on plainweave, such as crewel work, goldwork, stumpwork, cutwork, and candlewicking.

Embroideries that can be performed on plainweave do not require the crafter to perform stitches at a precise thread count. Most woven fabrics that were not specifically manufactured for the purpose of embroidery qualify as plainweave. Traditionally, linen plainweave is the preferred fabric for crewel embroidery. Other plainweaves suitable for crewel include denim, sailcloth, ticking, and organdy when worked in wool.

== Plainweave uses ==
Historic eighteenth century crewel embroidery preferentially used a linen and cotton twill plainweave because it wore well. The fabric's diagonal rib was regarded as an aesthetically pleasing contrast to the embroidery, although sometimes it was brushed before working to create a smoother nap. This material, known as fustian originated in Fustât in ancient times and was probably the forerunner of velvet.

Almost any plainweave fabric can be made suitable for goldwork and other metal embroidery. Fine linen is among the easiest to work with. Silk has been the preferred fabric historically in clerical and royal garments to achieve a shiny and sumptuous effect. Lightweight or stretchy plainweaves may require stabilization to prevent puckering. Traditionally a backing of linen or muslin would be used as a stabilizing element. Dressmaker's interlining and water-soluble paper are contemporary alternatives.

Whitework may be worked on either plainweave or counted thread fabric. When worked on plainweave it is known as fine white. Organdy, sheer Dacron, lawn, batiste, muslin, net, and sheer muslin and wool are suitable plainweaves for this type of embroidery.

Stumpwork embroidery can be done on nearly any fabric including silk, satin, felt, linen, cotton, and wool.
