= Chain stitch =

Type of embroidery stitch

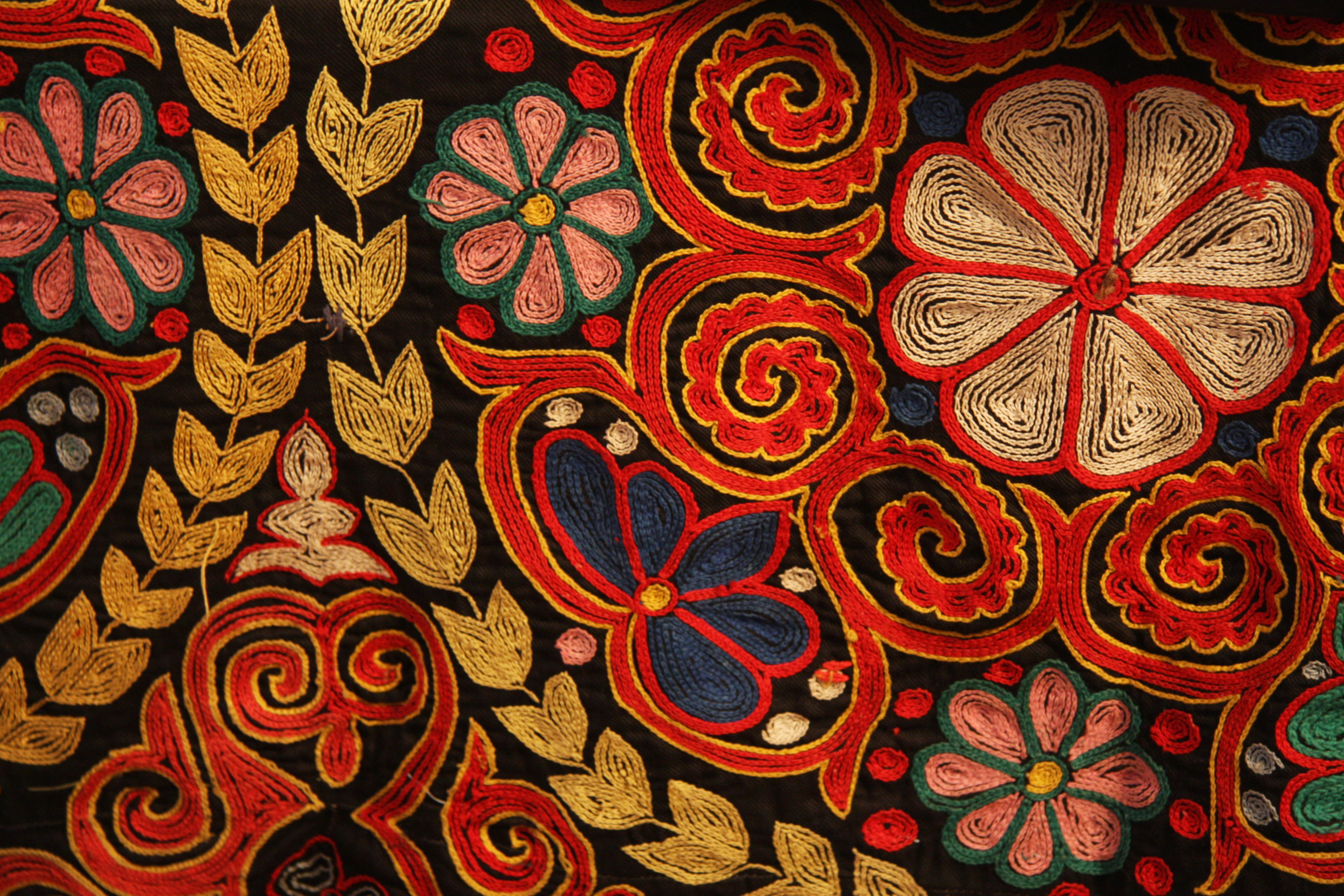
Traditional embroidery in chain stitch on a Kazakh rug, contemporary

Chain stitch is a sewing and embroidery technique in which a series of looped stitches form a chain-like pattern. Chain stitch is an ancient craft – examples of surviving Chinese chain stitch embroidery worked in silk thread have been dated to the Warring States period (5th – 3rd century BC). Handmade chain stitch embroidery does not require that the needle pass through more than one layer of fabric. For this reason the stitch is an effective surface embellishment near seams on finished fabric. Because chain stitches can form flowing, curved lines, they are used in many surface embroidery styles that mimic "drawing" in thread.

Chain stitches are also used in making tambour lace, needlelace, macramé and crochet.

In Azerbaijan, in the Sheki region, this ancient type of needlework is called tekeldus.

== History ==
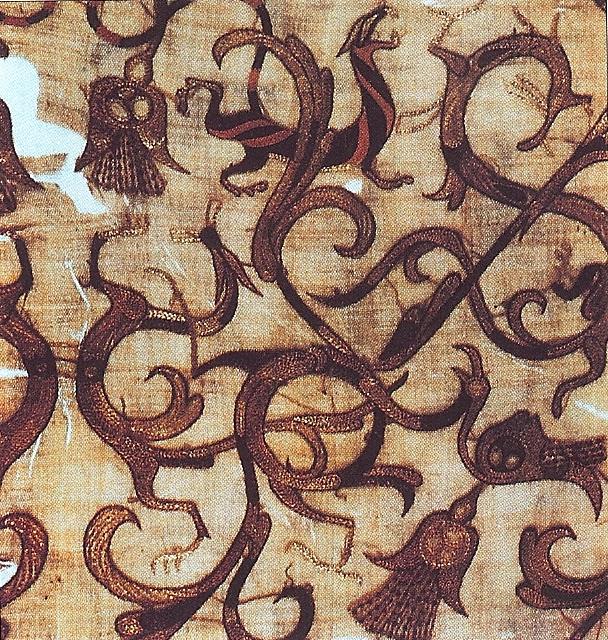
Detail of an embroidered silk gauze ritual garment from a 4th-century BC, Zhou era tomb at Mashan, Hubei province, China. Rows of even, round chain-stitches are used both for outline and to fill in color.

The earliest archaeological evidence of chain stitch embroidery dates from 1100 BC in China. Excavated from royal tombs, the embroidery was made using threads of silk. Chain stitch embroidery has also been found dating to the Warring States period. Chain stitch designs spread to Iran through the Silk Road.

== Applications ==
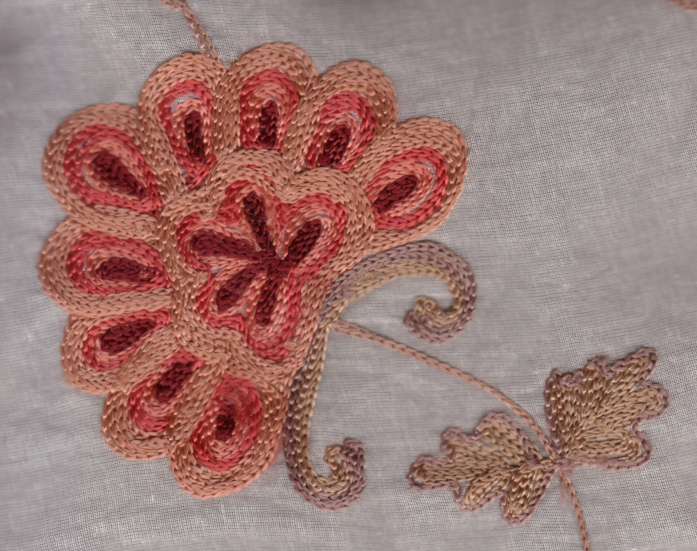
Machine embroidery in chain stitch on a voile curtain, China, early 21st century

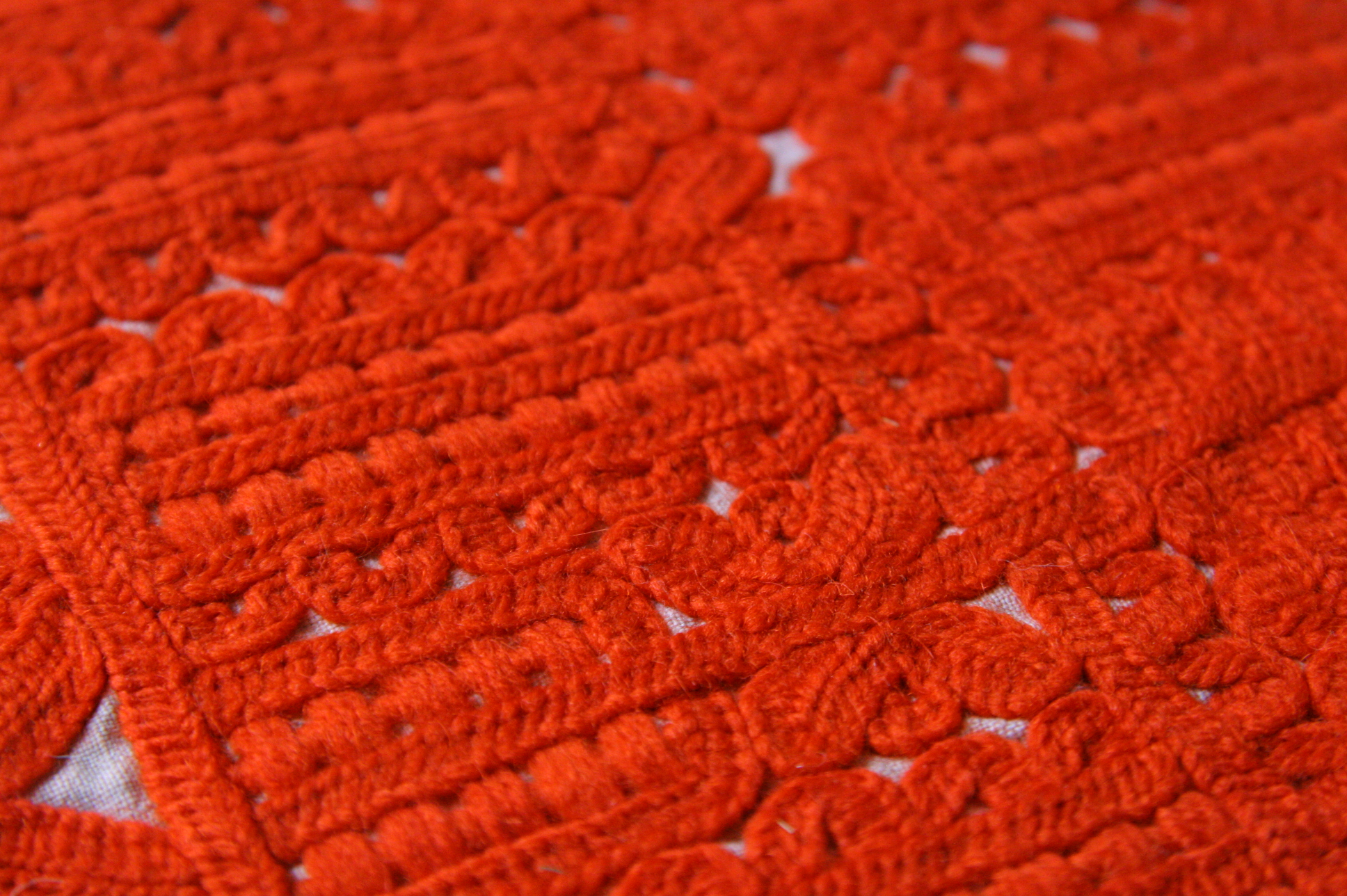
Open chain stitch from Kalotaszeg, early 20th century

=== Hand embroidery ===
Chain stitch and its variations are fundamental to embroidery traditions of many cultures, including Kashmiri numdahs, Iranian Resht work, Central Asian suzani, Hungarian Kalotaszeg "written embroidery", Jacobean embroidery, and crewelwork.

=== Machine sewing and embroidery ===
Chain stitch was the stitch used by early sewing machines; however, as it is easily unravelled from fabric, this was soon replaced with the more secure lockstitch. This ease of unraveling of the single-thread chain stitch, more specifically known as ISO 4915:1991 stitch 101, continues to be exploited for industrial purposes in the closure of bags for bulk products.

Machine embroidery in chain stitch, often in traditional hand-worked crewel designs, is found on curtains, bed linens, and upholstery fabrics.

== Variants ==
=== Hand variants ===
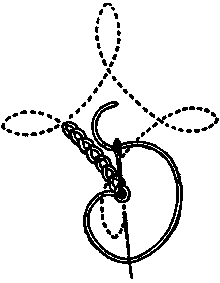
"Drawing" or outlining in basic chain stitch

Variations of the basic chain stitch include:

- Back-stitched chain stitch
- Braided stitching
- Cable chain stitch
- Knotted chain stitch
- Open chain stitch
- Petal chain stitch
- Rosette chain stitch
- Singalese chain stitch
- Twisted chain stitch
- Wheat-ear stitch
- Zig-zag chain stitch

==== Hand stitch gallery ====
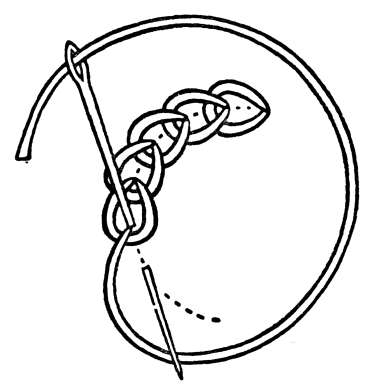
Basic chain stitch

Braid stitch

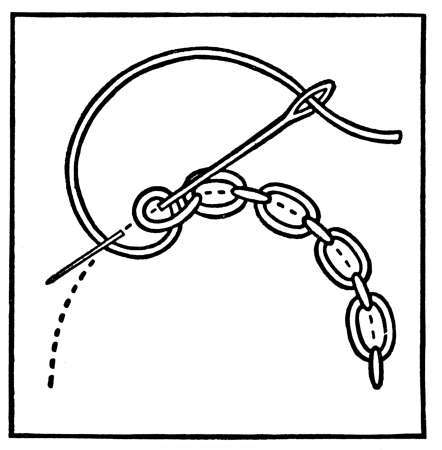
Cable chain stitch

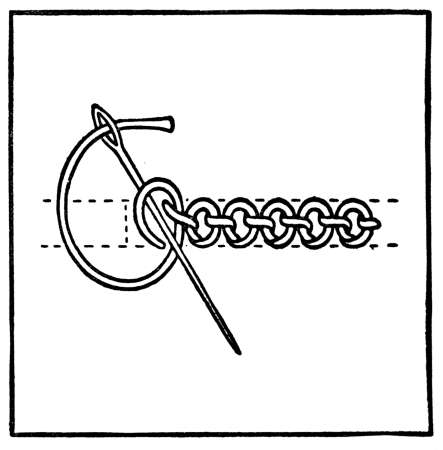
Knotted chain stitch

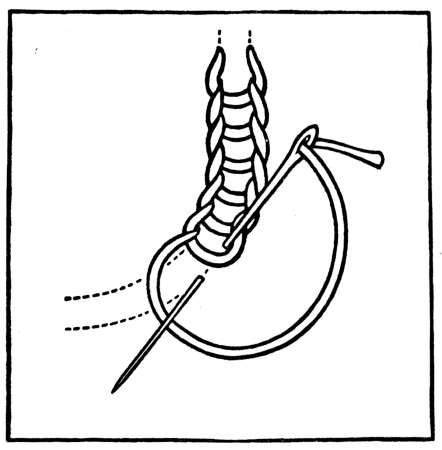
Open chain stitch

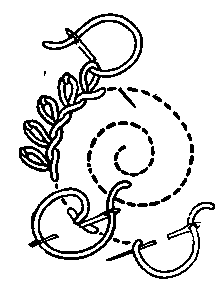
Petal chain stitch

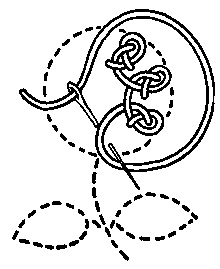
Rosette chain stitch

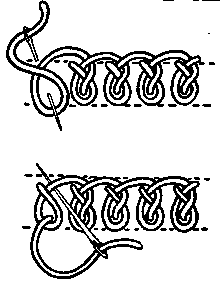
Rosette chain line

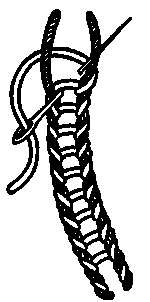
Singalese chain stitch

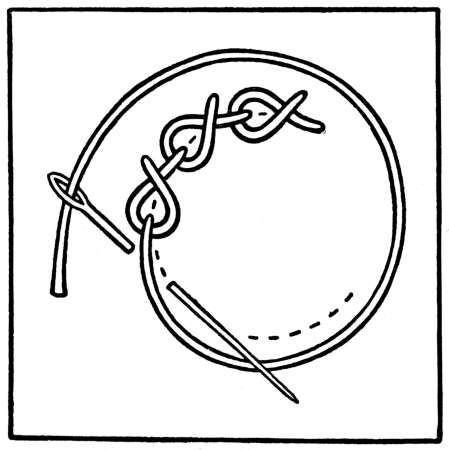
Twisted chain stitch

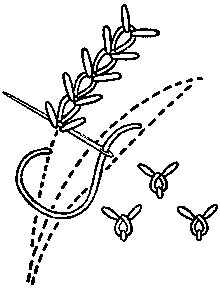
Wheat-ear stitch

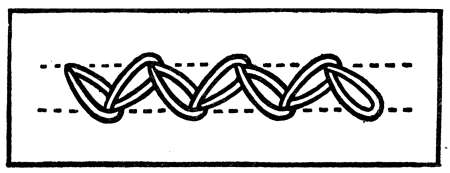
Zig-zag chain stitch

=== Machine variants ===
- The basic chain stitch is made by first sending the needle down through the material. Then, as the needle rises upward, the friction of the thread against the fabric is sufficient to form a small loop on the underside of the material. That loop is caught by a circular needle which is beneath the work. The machine then moves the material forward projecting the loop on the underside from the previous stitch. The next drop of the needle goes through the previous loop. The circular needle then releases the first loop and picks up the new loop and the process repeats.
- The double chain stitch uses two threads per needle. The boon of the double chain stitch is that from the top side the seam looks tidy and minimalistic like an ordinary lockstitch. The loops are only visible from the bottom side and as such they can be hidden away from view, and away from things that might get caught on them. Double chain stitch is used this way in the construction of denim jeans. Another boon of the double chain stitch over the lockstitch is that no bobbin or bobbin case is required. As such, operators do not have to stop to wind a bobbin after the (relatively small capacity) bobbin runs out. Furthermore, since no bobbin case is required, less room is required underneath the bed of the sewing machine. One example of this is narrow post bed sewing machines for stitching leather reinforcements onto already-assembled gloves. Also the lack of bobbin cases allows two, three, or more needles to be used (still two threads per needle, so a three needle machine would have six threads) at a time, which is useful for topstitching. (Lock stitch machines can accommodate at most two bobbin cases under the presser foot, one positioned to the left of the needles and one positioned to the right. This effectively limits lock stitch machines to having at most two needles.) Finally, double chain stitch is found in bulk material packaging, where it is used to close large bags. As this stitch can be easily unraveled, this permits easy opening of bags sewn shut in this manner.

==== Machine stitch gallery ====
Formation of a simple chain stitch using a looper

Formation of the double locking chain stitch

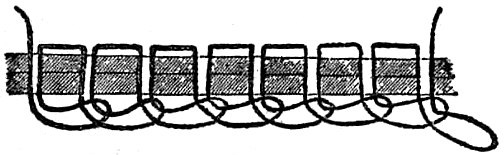
Basic chain stitch

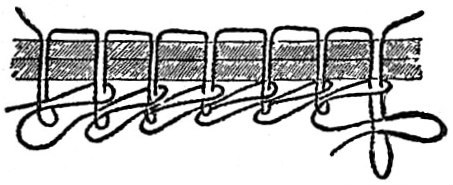
Double chain stitch

== Notes ==
Union Special Portable Chain Stitch machine internal mechanism 2200 Portable bag closing machines

== See also ==
- List of knots
