= Textiles of Oaxaca =

Textiles from Oaxaca, Mexico

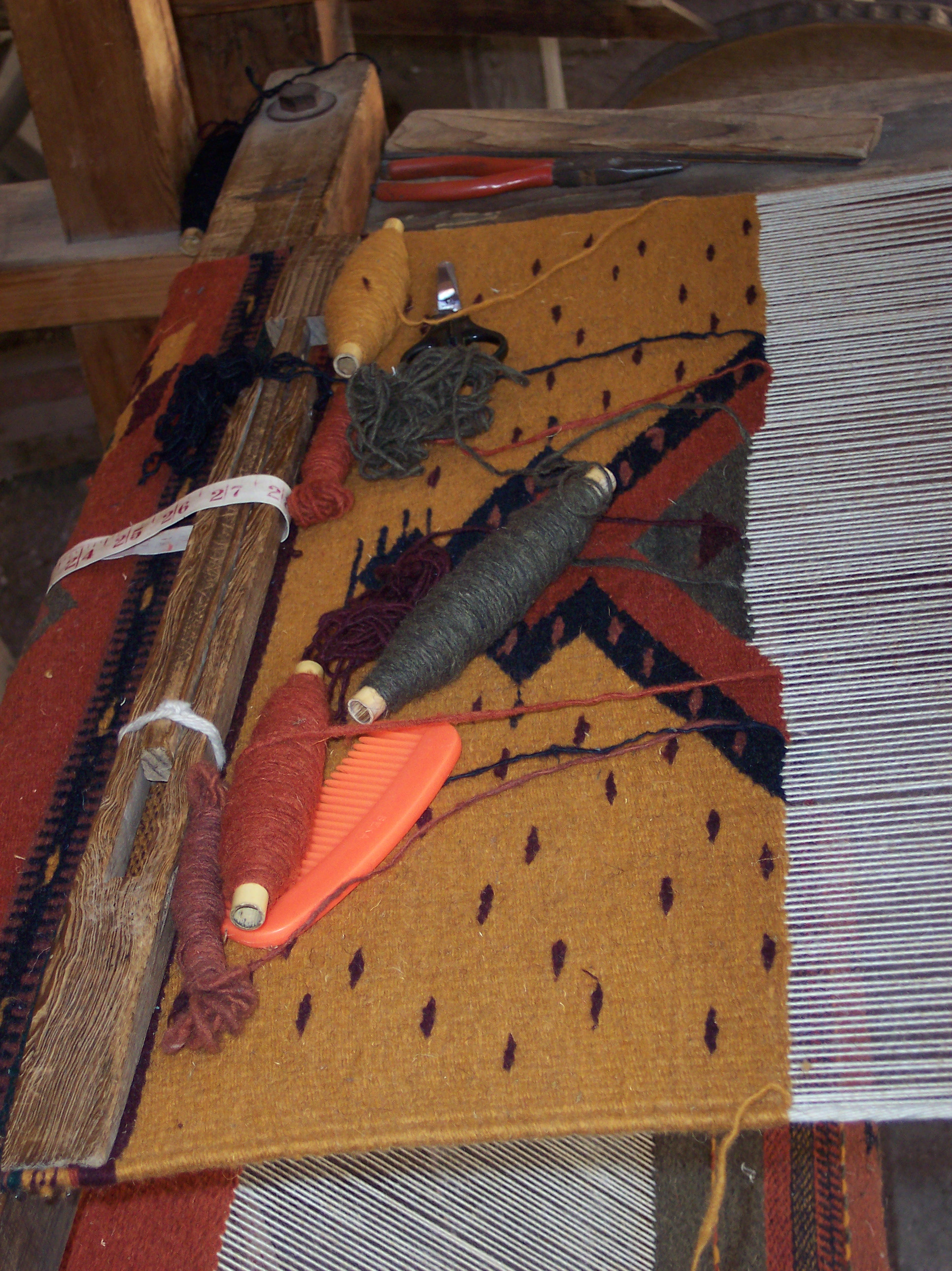
A work in progress on a stationary loom

The state of Oaxaca in southern Mexico has a noteworthy tradition of finely crafted textiles, particularly handmade embroidery and woven goods that frequently use a backstrap loom. Oaxaca is home to several different groups of indigenous peoples, each of which has a distinctive textile tradition.

Most notably present in the state of Oaxaca are the Zapotec, Nahua and Mixtec tribes. Each of these groups of indigenous people contributed their own influences on the modern atuendos or “attires” in Oaxaca today. Textiles and particular clothing garments and accessories can tell a lot about the culture in which they were produced. By analyzing the textiles, the technology used to create the garment can be deciphered. Many of the tools used were similar throughout Mexico, however, some tools were more common in specific regions or villages, resulting in many of the similarities in embroidery and patterns. The different garments created in Oaxaca also differ based on the indigenous peoples’ view of the world and their own social structures. For example, a cape-like garment called a tilma or las capa, made of cotton was strictly reserved for members of the upper class. Most textiles made from cotton were used by the upper class because it was a material that was much easier to work with than the usual leaves of plants, thus making the crop a luxury.

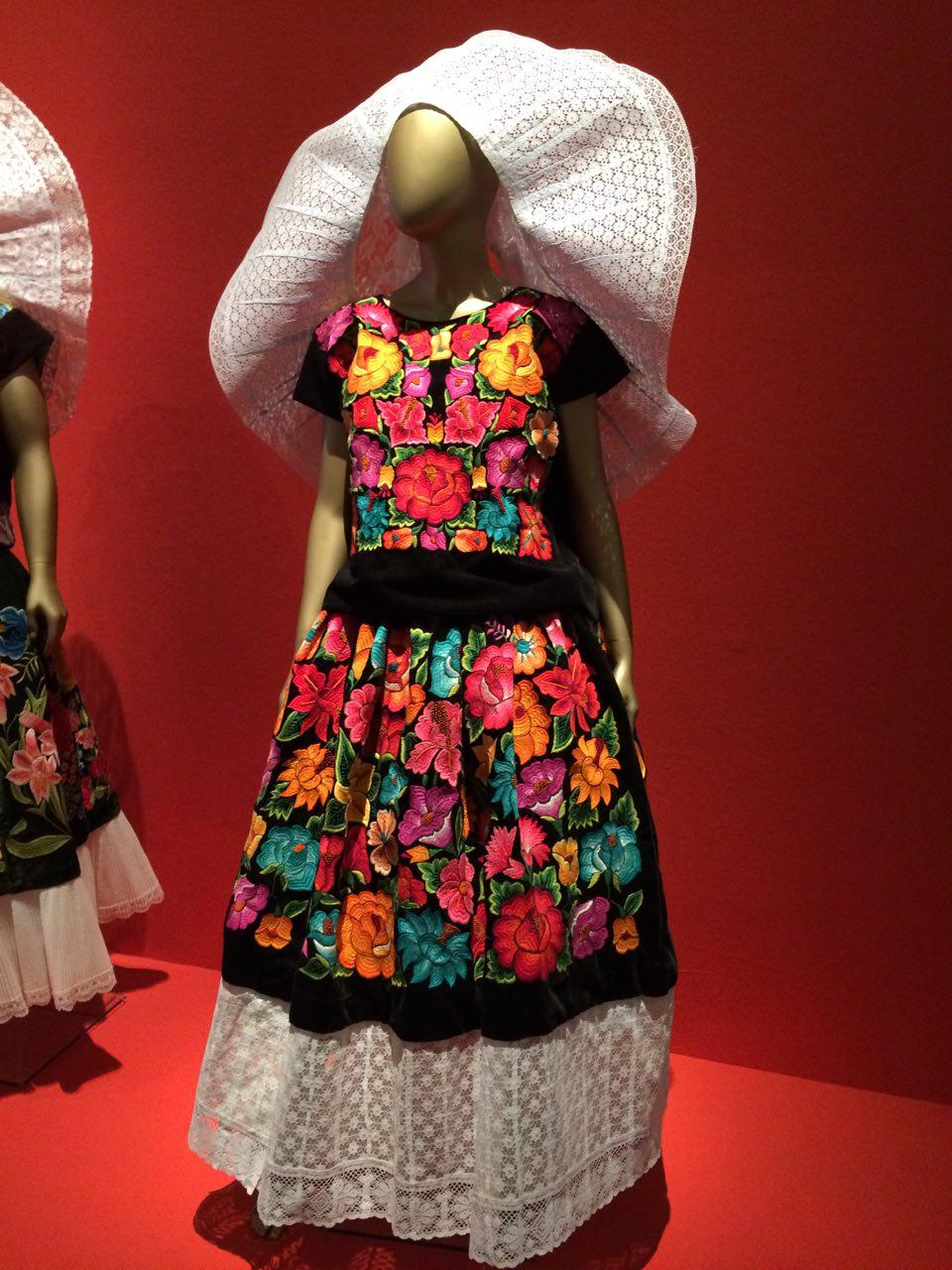
The Traje de Tehuana, a contemporary indigenous dress in Oaxaca displaying the variation of color and textiles

Many of the ancient textile and attire traditions from Mexico have disappeared over time with climate change being one of the reasons why. Because many of these antique, traditional styles of dress have become obsolete, they can often be recreated or analyzed only from murals and sculptures that depict the textiles and attire as well as how both were worn. Consequently, as these older textiles and traditional styles became less popular over time, it gave rise to the contemporary indigenous dress that is often seen today; this contemporary dress is known as the Traje de Tehuana. The attires of ancient Mexico still influence the contemporary dress; some of the garments have actually been passed on over time which slight adjustments of textile, materials used, embroidery, patterns etc. The effect of the ancient attire on the contemporary dress is evident through the similarities and purposes of the contemporary styles. In ancient dress, a Tilma, was a part of a man's dress, usually made of cotton and worn by the upper-class. However, it is evident that in contemporary dress, a Rebozo (also called Sarape or Gabán) is a shawl worn by women and heavily influenced by the Tilma. Many of the key aspects and characteristics of older attire serve as a template for the patterns and embroidery seen in contemporary textiles and garments.

== Construction ==
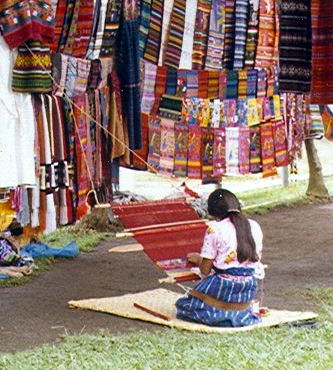
A woman from Guatemala works on a backstrap loom, in Mesoamerican tradition.

Oaxacan fibers may be hand spun from cotton or locally cultivated silk. Traditional dye sources include Purpura pansa among the Huave, Chontal, and Mixtec people. The Chontal and Mazatec also utilize cochineal to attain bright red tones.

According to Alejandro de Ávila B., founding director of the Ethnobotanical Garden in Oaxaca, the region's biological diversity yields Mexico's greatest variety of fibers and dyes, and "the technical sophistication of Oaxaca's textiles is unparalleled in the country."

Traditional clothing items among the peoples of Oaxaca include the huipil, a women's blouse constructed from several panels; the ceñidor, a type of sash among the Mazatec; and the paño, a Chinantec head covering. Handcrafted Oaxacan textiles employ plainweave, brocade patterns, gauze weave.

Much can be said about the technology being used to create these textiles based on the final product when they are complete. In ancient Mexico, waist looms were used to craft the garments. These specific tools would not allow the specific garment being woven to exceed an arm's length in width. Though this meant that the specific garment being woven was relatively narrow, the waist loomed allowed for the edges and borders of these pieces to be very neat and straight without needing an additional correction process afterward. The construction of these textiles varies significantly from each other. Many of the fabrics and garments created are created using natural resources such as the leaves of plants, cotton etc. A lot of fibers can be made from the leaves of plants which is a good because these resources are natural and abundant. This also aids in the dyeing process. Many of the bright colors attributed to the traditional dress can be attained by the use of natural dyes that culminate to create a vivid spectrum of indigenous dress.

== Motifs ==
Mexican textile expert Irmgard Weitlaner-Johnson associates pre-Christian spiritual traditions with the presence of butterflies in Mazatec textile motifs. She wrote, "To this day the Mazatecs identify the butterfly as the soul that leaves the body. They believe that the souls of the deceased have permission to come to this world once a year on All Saints' Day and the Day of the Dead to visit their family. This is the period when butterflies are most abundant in the area and the Mazatecs consider it a sin to kill them."

Regional motifs without specific spiritual meaning, or for which disputed interpretations exist, include a class of stepped fret known as xicalcoliuhqui, which means "twisted ornament for decorating gourds" in the Nahuatl language; and the double spiral ilhuitl, whose name translates as "fiesta day." Pre-Colonial tradition associates color with the four cardinal directions: yellow with east, red with north, blue and green with west, and white with south. Another shared motif among the region's indigenous peoples is a rectangular ornament below the neckline of the huipil. No specific symbolism is known, but it is a frequent theme in pre-colonial codices and surviving historic textiles that remains in popular use.

== Other symbolic uses ==
Traditionally, Oaxacan women wrap a red faja (a woven sash) around their waists as a protection from evil.

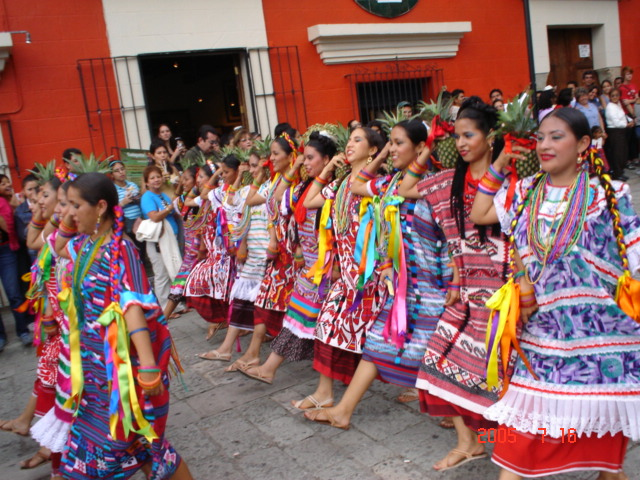
Oaxacan women on parade in traditional apparel

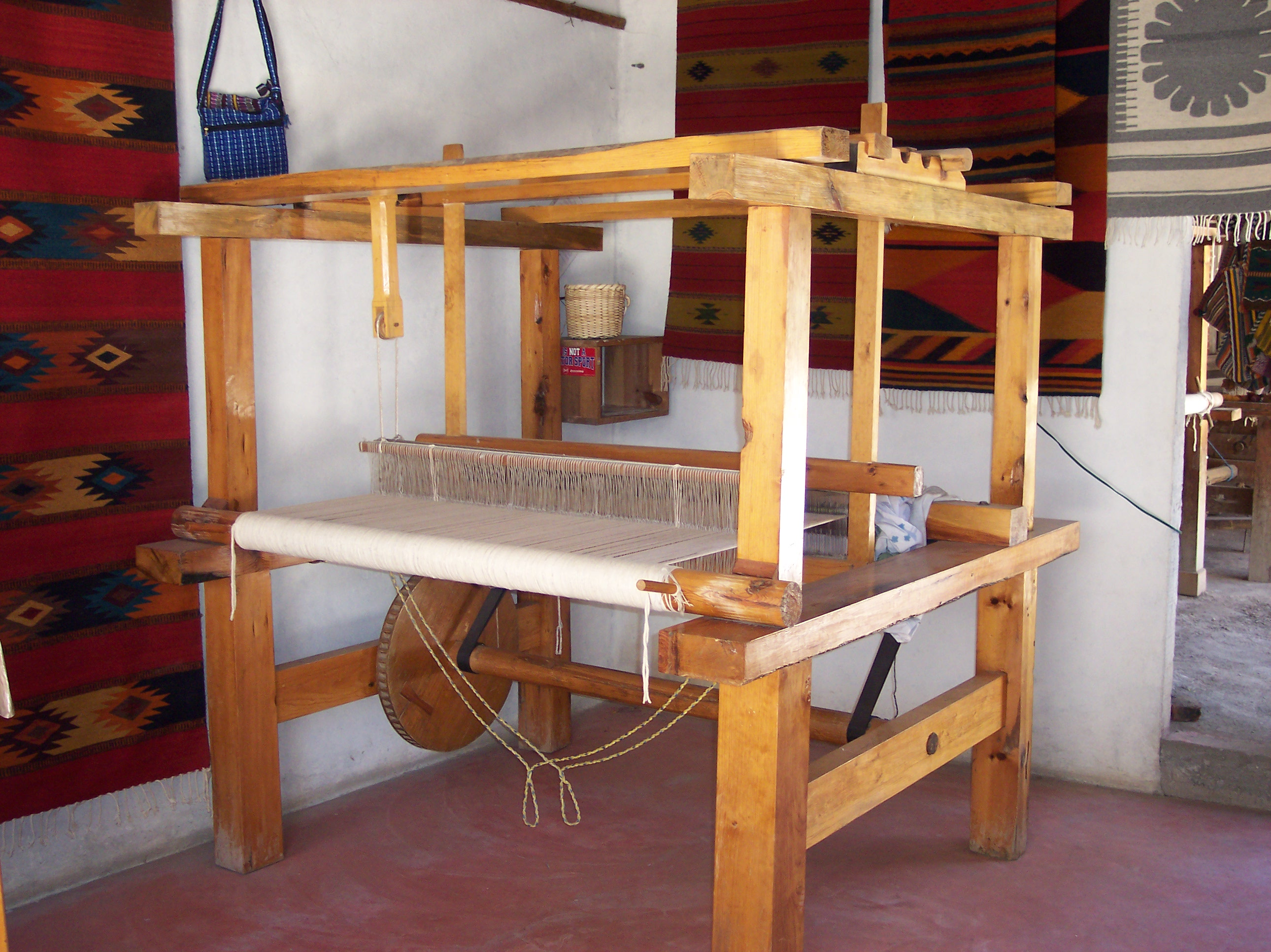
A hand weaving loom in Oaxaca

== See also ==
- Weaving (mythology)
- Maya textiles
- Tyrian purple
