= Margaret Layton's embroidered jacket =

Example of English Jacobean embroidery

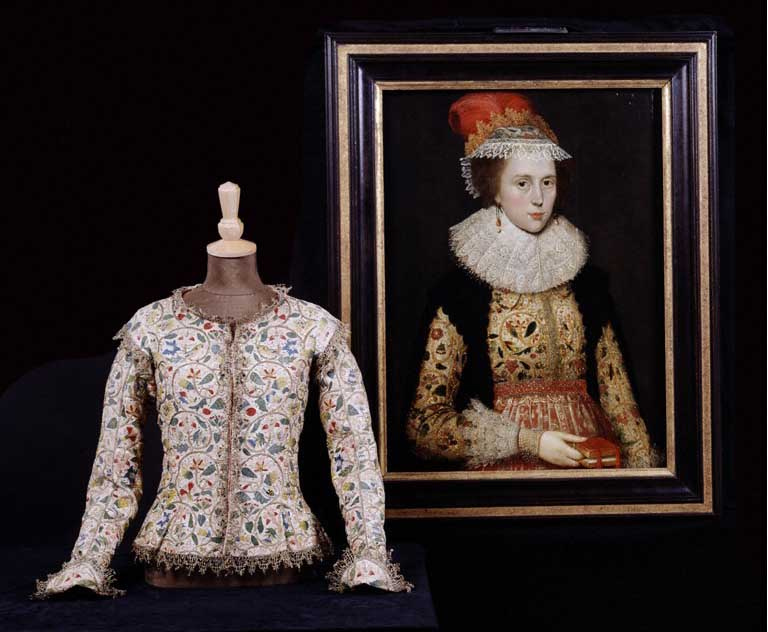
Jacket and portrait of Margaret Layton, about 1610–20 V&A Museum no. T.228-1994

Margaret Layton's jacket is a surviving example of English Jacobean embroidery, significant because it appears in a portrait which has also survived. The jacket was originally owned and worn by Margaret Layton (1579–1641), wife of Francis Layton (1577–1661) who was one of the Yeomen of the Jewel House during the reigns of James I, Charles I and, briefly, Charles II. Embroidered linen jackets were worn as informal dress, and were particularly popular among wealthy women in the late sixteenth and early seventeenth centuries. This jacket is exquisitely decorated with flowers, birds and butterflies, embroidered in coloured silks, coiled tendrils of silver-gilt plaited braid stitch and silver-gilt sequins. The edges of the jacket are trimmed with silver and silver-gilt bobbin lace and silver-gilt spangles.

This jacket dates to between 1610–15 and was altered in 1620 before it appears in a portrait of Margaret Layton which probably dates from around 1620 and is painted in oils on oak boards. The painter is not known, but the style of portraiture is similar to that of Marcus Gheeraerts the Younger (1561?–1635) who was the most fashionable portrait painter of the period.

Both the jacket and the portrait are in the Victoria and Albert Museum, who formally acquired them in 1994. At the time, they were catalogued as worn by, and depicting Margaret Laton as per records done in 1933 by a former curator. However, more recent research confirmed that the name was always spelled Layton in contemporary documents, monuments for the family in Rawdon, West Yorkshire, and the Dictionary of National Biography, leading to the Museum making widespread and ongoing corrections.

== See also ==
- 1600–1650 in fashion
- Jacobean embroidery

== Bibliography ==
- Jackson, Anna, ed. (2001). V&A: A Hundred Highlights. V&A Publications.
- Robertshaw, Wilfrid (1950). An Early Local Portrait. Bradford: "The Bradford Antiquary", New Series, Part XXXV.
- Thornton, Claire (2011). 'Margaret Layton's Waistcoat', in Seventeenth-Century Women’s Dress Patterns, vol.1 (eds. North, Susan and Jenny Tiramani). London: V&A Publishing.
