= Bed hangings =

Historical furniture

Bed hangings or bed curtains are fabric panels that surround a bed; they were used from medieval times through to the 19th century. Bed hangings provided privacy when the master or great bed was in a public room, such as the parlor, but also kept in warmth and showed evidence of wealth when beds were located in private areas of the home. When bedrooms became more common in the mid-1700s, the use of bed hangings diminished.

Bed hangings were made of various fabrics, depending on the place, time period, and wealth of the owner. Fabrics included wool, cotton, linen, fustian, and, for those who could afford it, silk or velvet. Stitches were worked in wool or, for the rich or the nobility, silk and gold. Decorations on bed hangings also varied based on geography and time period. French hangings during the Renaissance might depict embroidered scenes from the Bible, mythology, or allegory. Hangings from the UK used floral, leaf, chinoiserie, and animal themes at various times, and those from the American Colonies often followed suit, though with less dense stitching to preserve scarce crewel wool. Examples of bed hangings can be found in museums and historic homes.

== Purpose ==
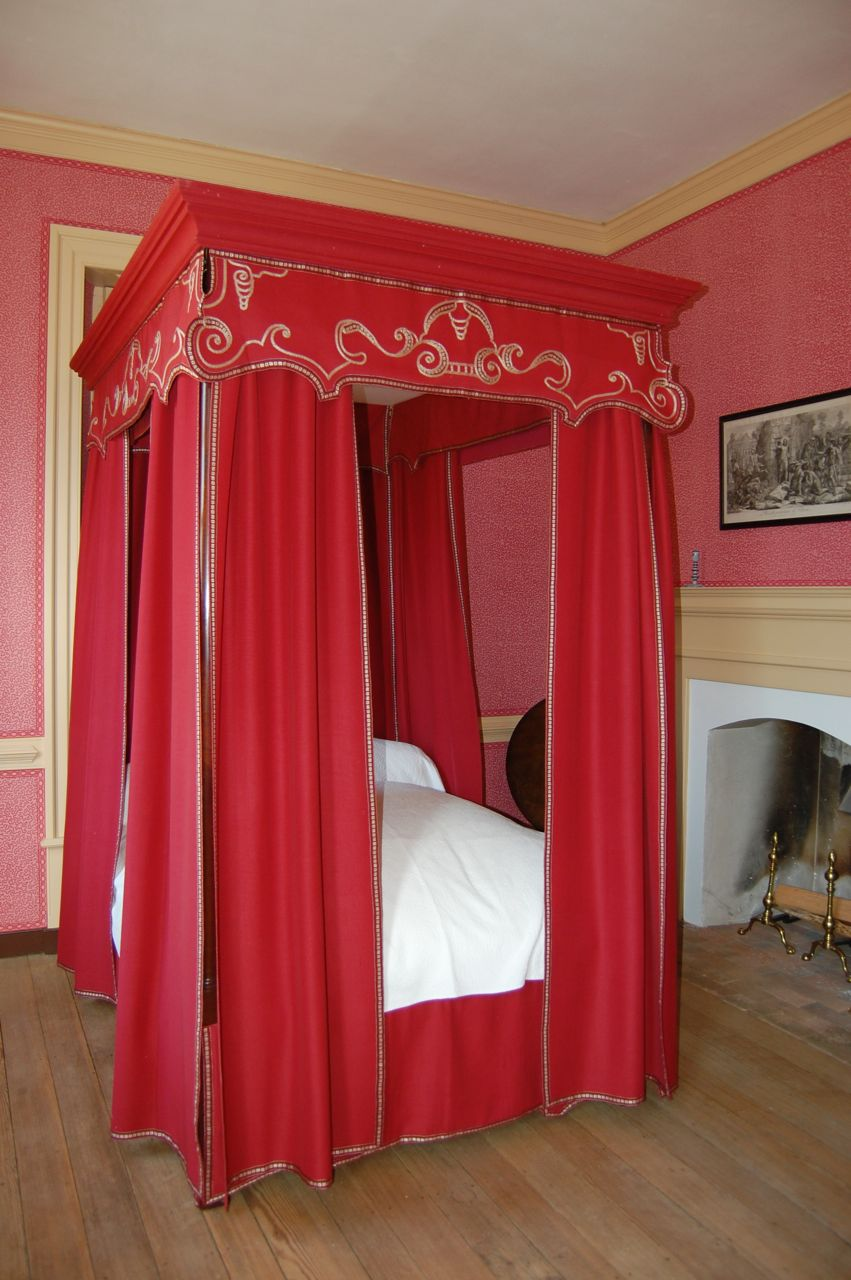
Colonial Williamsburg bed with a set of bed hangings

Bed hangings, also known as bed "furniture," were used from medieval times through the 19th century, though their popularity waned from the mid 1700s. Bed hangings proved useful for several reasons. The master bed was often located in the Parlour, and the hangings provided privacy. Other beds may have occupied the hall and kitchen, as well as the upstairs bedrooms.

Given the public locations of some beds, the decorated hangings also served as a show of wealth and helped to keep warmth in. Bed hangings in the second half of the 1600s through the first half of the 1700s were often embroidered with Jacobean motifs. Some hangings were embroidered with blue and green crewel wool on cream cotton and linen. Although many examples of crewel work survive, such curtains are rarely specified in inventories, and wealthier owners paid for embroidery in coloured silks and gold and silver thread. By the mid-18th century, separate rooms for sleeping were becoming more common. The spaces where beds were located were no longer areas where courtiers gathered, with the attendant need to impress. The need for bed hangings diminished.

== Categories of bed hangings ==
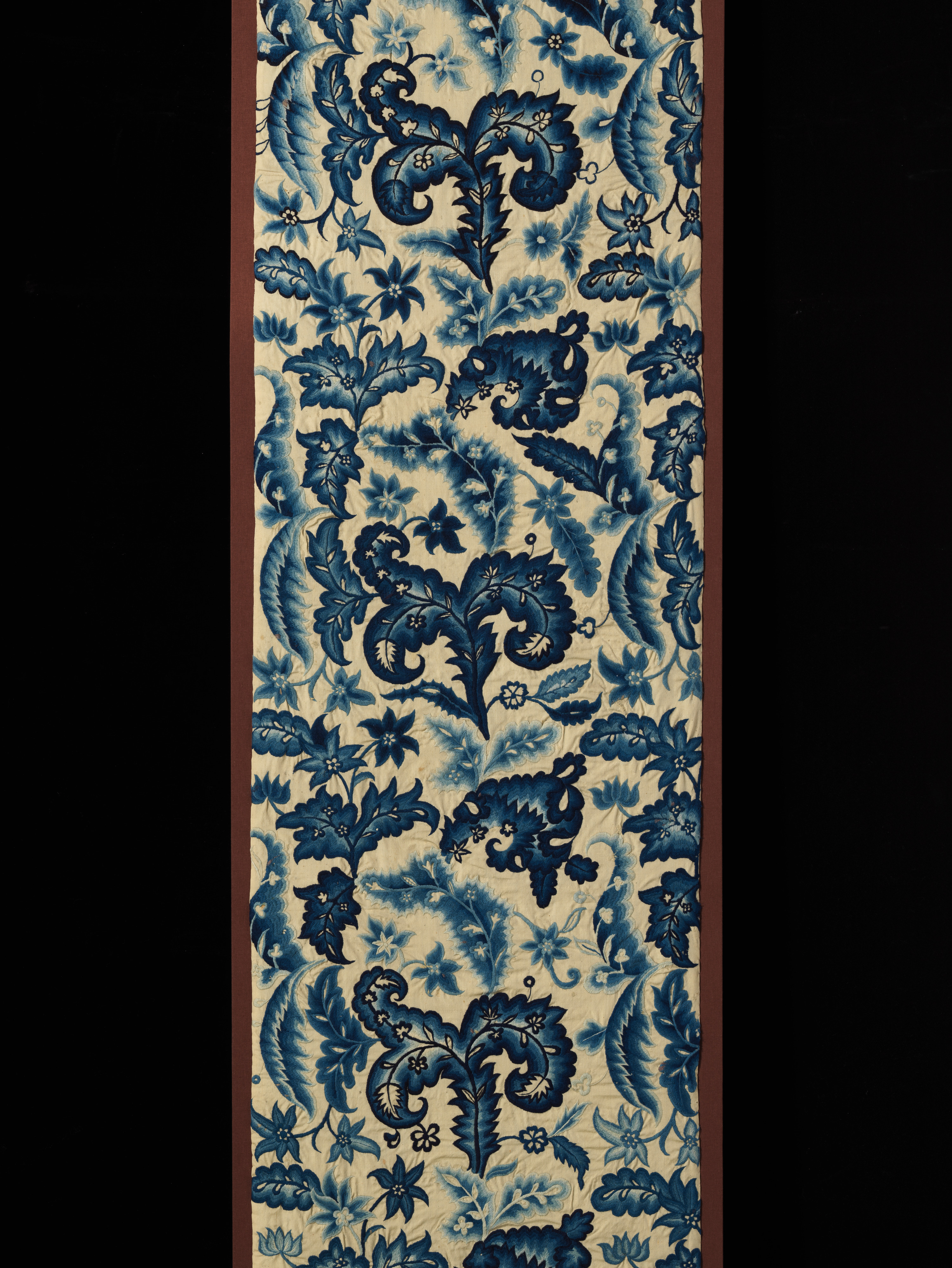
British bed curtain panel, wool thread on wool plain-weave fabric, early 18th century, Metropolitan Museum of Art

Some medieval bed canopies and curtains were suspended from ceiling beams. In English these canopies were known as a "hung celour". The fabric canopy concealed an iron frame with iron curtain rods.These beds can be seen in manuscript illuminations, paintings, and engravings, showing cords suspending the front of the canopy to the ceiling. Such beds could easily be dismantled and the rich fabric hangings carefully packed away. Scottish inventories of the 16th and 17th-century mention "chapel beds". These had elaborate fabric canopies, apparently suspended from the ceiling of the bedchamber. Mary, Queen of Scots had a number of her chapel beds converted into "foure nuikit" four cornered standing beds in 1565, recycling rich fabrics from other beds and velvet covers were made for the new posts.

A complete set of bed furniture for a standing bed may include a coverlet (not technically a bed hanging), "a headcloth, three or four valences (depending on whether the bed was against the wall), side curtains, a tester cloth (canopy or celure), and bases, attached to the bed rail."

- Headcloth (or Head cloth): this would hang above the head of the bed and extended just below the head board. It would normally be as wide as the bed. If there was extra width, it may have been designed to be wrapped around the bed posts.
- Valences: these short pieces of fabric would extend around the top of the bed, outside of the other hangings, and would lie perfectly flat. They were the "crowning element in a set of bed hangings." They were usually in three pieces, one for each side and one for the bottom of the bed, but by the late 1700s a valence might be one long piece.
- Side curtains: these would hang on both sides of the bed, and be used to cover the upper half of the bed.
- Tester cloth: the canopy or celure for the bed (the word tester was occasionally used to mean the headcloth)
- Foot curtains: these would be wider than the side curtains. They would be pulled both toward the center sides of the bed, to meet the side curtains, and towards the foot of the bed, to meet in the center across from the headcloth.

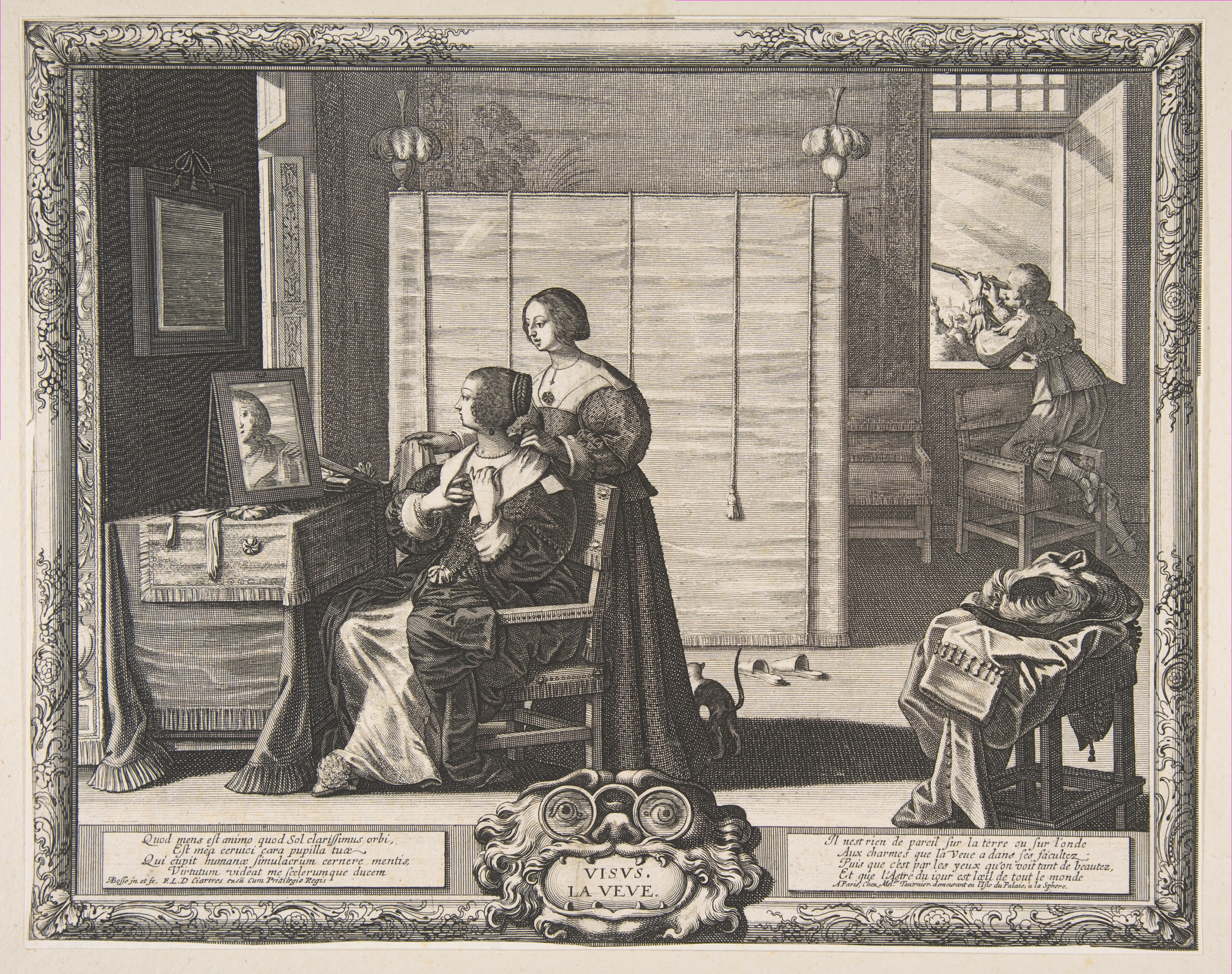
Allegory of Sight, by Abraham Bosse, instead of rails and rings, the fixed bed curtains have cords to tie them up

- Bases: These would often be stiff, and used to cover the lower bed frame.
- Cantonniéres or Bonnegrâces: A 17th-century elaboration was to place narrow fixed curtains at the corners or foot posts.
- Case curtains: some elaborate 18th-century beds were given permanent protective case-curtains which ran on an iron rod in front of the bed proper to keep the dust off the precious fabrics. The French designer Daniel Marot called the cover curtains un tour de lit.

Bed curtains were lined with a show fabric, often different to the outside. Some beds had inner valances concealing the curtain rods and rings. In England, after 1620, wooden beds with carved wooden headboards became less popular than a fashionable type known as a "French bed", a fabric box often depicted in paintings and engravings, especially by Abraham Bosse. These beds could have headcloths, embroidered with the owner's heraldry. The curtains at the sides and ends were sometimes fixed at the top and designed to be pulled up and tied.

== Materials ==
English bed curtains were often made of wool, though in the mid 1600s linen and cotton fabrics started to be used, particularly fustian, a heavy twill-woven cloth with a linen warp and a cotton weft. Baptist Hicks sold watchet (blue) velvet for a valence and watchet taffeta sarcenet for curtains to the Earl of Northumberland in 1586, from his London shop at the sign of the White Bear. Matching watchet fringes were supplied by a silkman, Mr Bate. Bess of Hardwick owned an opulent "Pearl bed" featuring the Cavendish heraldry, which she bequeathed to her daughter, the Countess of Shrewsbury. The valences were of black velvet embroidered with pearls and silver "sivines and woodbines" (wild raspberries and vines). The counterpane of black velvet was striped with silver and coiled silver purl.

In the late 1600s those who could afford it might use silk and velvet fabrics. Some wealthy householders had sets of summer and winter curtains. A woollen fabric called perpetuana was popular in the 17th century. The warm woollen curtains could be as sumptuously decorated with embroidery and passementerie as the suites of silk curtains used in summer.

Colonial American bed hangings were often made of home-grown linen or from local wool. These would be spun, dyed and woven, though finer fabrics were available for purchase.

=== Passementerie, lace, and fringes ===
Bed hanging fabrics were decorated and edged with fringes and borders of lace and passementerie. These were carefully described in the inventories of aristocrats and the wealthy. "Passamayne", a variety of bobbin woven lace was made of silver and gold Venice thread to trim the beds of Henry VIII and James V of Scotland. Bess of Hardwick had a canopy bed with six curtains, "striped" with gold and silver, and "layde with gold lace about the edges, and a gold twist downe the seams and fringed about with golde fringe". The curtains of a bed owned by Anne of Denmark in the first decade of the 17th century were made of fabric in panes of alternating colour, the seams covered with lace of green silk with gold and silver thread. In Cambridge, Massachusetts, in 1643, Elizabeth Glover owned 11 beds, one with curtains of "Cheney" glazed worsted wool with "a deep silke silk fring[e] on the vallance, & a smaller on the curtaines", and the counterpane was embellished with strips of green lace.

Aristocrats like Elizabeth Preston, Countess of Desmond of Kilkenny Castle, bought stocks of gold and silver thread for passementerie, which may have been made up to their specification by specialist weavers. After 1660, the words "galloon" or "loom lace" for woven lace applied to bed curtains replaced the older term "passamayne". Curtains were also decorated with tapes and ribbons.

== Needlework decorations ==
=== Continental bed hangings ===
Embroidery was used to decorate bed hangings, with some of the finest embroidery produced in Caen, in France. Elaborately decorated bed hangings were known in medieval and renaissance France as courtepointerie, a term now associated with quilts. These sumptuous bed hangings were purchased by the nobility and royalty. In 1662, during the reign of Louis XIV, the royal Gobelins workshops were established. Although better known for their tapestries, there and at Versailles, professional embroiderers worked on royal commissions of bed hangings based on the designs of painters. During the Renaissance in France, bed valences were embroidered with scenes from the Bible, mythology, and allegory. Many bed hangings were made from velvet or satin and had applique interlacing and scroll designs. These motifs full of movement, as well as others that were delicate and refined in the 16th century were followed in the next by a more monumental style produced by professionals. Those of the highest quality were made by professionals. Bed hangings were highly valued possessions, and records from the Middle Ages through the 1700s indicate that they were their owners' most prized possessions.

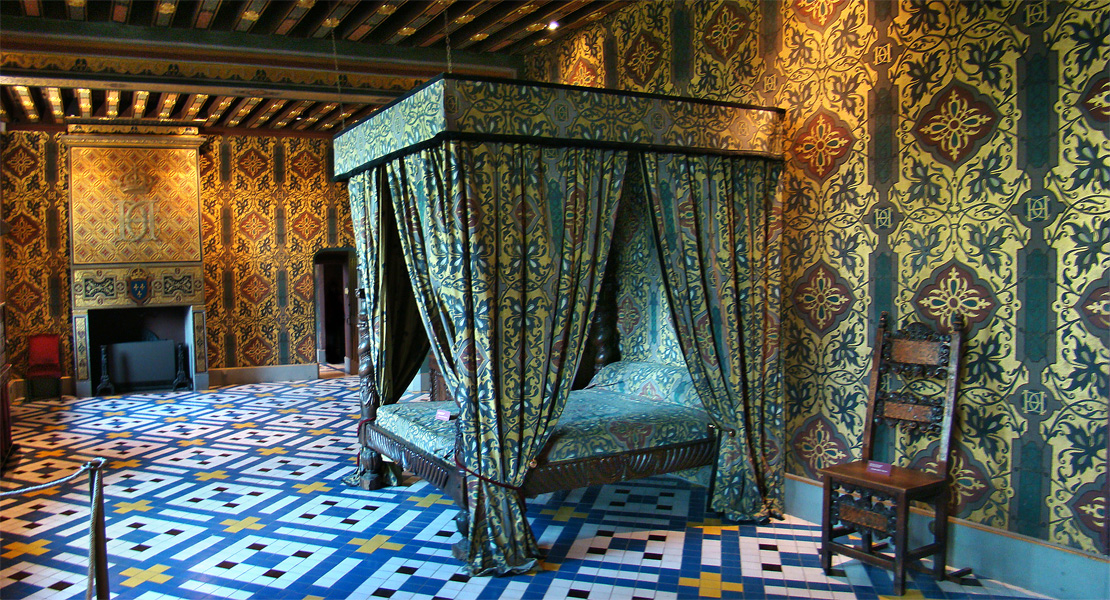
Queen's bedroom, Château de Blois, Loir-et-Cher, Centre, France

In Italy, embroidered bed hangings had been made in Palermo since the 12th century. Professional workers embroidered padded gold threads on velvet or satin, used braid-outlined appliqué, sometimes with silk embroidery for use as furnishings such as valences. In the second half of the 17th century, lighter domestic embroidered work became more colorful, freer, and naturalistic.

In 1512, Bona Sforza of Aragon married King Zygmunt I of Poland. As part of her trousseau, she brought a four poster marriage bed with 23 hangings attached to the canopy. One of the most expensive "was made of silver material with a gold border, woven with the stylized inflorescence of artichokes."

When Dorothy Sidney, Countess of Leicester, was in Paris in 1639 as the wife the English ambassador, she was involved in commissioning bed hangings and furnishings provided for Thomas Wentworth, 1st Earl of Strafford as Lord Deputy of Ireland. She recommended that Ralph Grynder's workshop in London supply the woodwork of the beds and the matching suites of chairs and stools.

=== Luxury and the royal court ===
In England, Elizabeth of York, the wife of Henry VII, employed an embroiderer called Robynet to work on her "riche bedde" and other works in 1502. Robynet had a team of four men and three female embroiderers who were paid wages and board money to lodge in Richmond Palace for seven weeks. The account mentions black crewel wool used to "purfulle" or purfle around the roses, and tawny thread used to lay embroidered work on red satin edges. Making the shapes of roses and clouds involved the use of searing candles. Robynet also used round and flat gold thread.

Beds were made as proud displays of family and marital heraldry. William Capel (died 1515), mayor of London, and his wife Margaret Arundell, owned a bed with valences of crimson satin and red sarcenet silk curtains, embroidered with the Capel and Arundell arms, their anchor badge, and their motto. The Capel anchor badge was carved in the doorways at their house in Rayne, Essex.

The inventories of Henry VIII include a number of beds, recording the main fabric colours. Often, all the components were the same colour. There are also examples of the use of contrasting fabrics, with a bed with a crimson and purple canopy, yellow, white, and purple curtains, and a russet and yellow counterpoint or covering. The fabrics were enriched with embroidery, and coloured stones and pearls. A pearl bed was supplied by Pierre Conyn in 1540, and a bed with rich Arras (tapestry) curtains was bought for Prince Edward from Petar van de Wall.

For much of the 17th-century, the most prestigious beds at the English court were imported from France. Makers and upholsterers in Paris who supplied bed to English monarchs and aristocrats include John Casbert, Jean Poicteven, Jean Peyrard, Francis Lapierre, Philip Guibert, and Simon Delobel. When Dorothy Sidney, Countess of Leicester was in Paris in 1639, she became involved in ordering beds and curtains for Thomas Wentworth, 1st Earl of Strafford as Lord Deputy of Ireland. She recommended that Ralph Grynder's workshop in London supply the woodwork of the beds and the matching suites of chairs and stools. In the 1690s, English furniture makers and Huguenot silk weavers established in Spitalfields made beds for William and Mary.

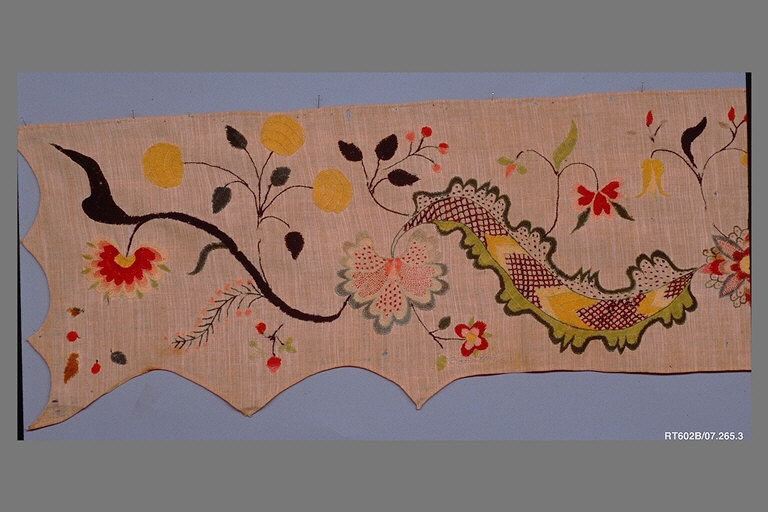
American crewel valence, possibly from Connecticut, 1760–1770, Metropolitan Museum of Art

=== Crewel embroidery ===
For more modest households and uses in England and the colonial US, crewel embroidery with wool was used to decorate bed hangings from the mid 1600s to the mid 1700s. Some more economical bed hangings were plain or mechanically decorated. The designs used in England were more dense than the open designs found in colonial America, and many used a wider range of stitches. Thread was hard to get in Colonial America, and so it was not used where it would not show. Colonial bed hangings used stitches where most of the wool is visible on the front, and not wasted on the back. Such stitches include economy (Romanian) stitch, flat stitch, herringbone, buttonhole, running (outline), and French and bullion knot stitches. Regardless, the work involved a great deal of time and effort, as it required decorating large expanses of fabric.

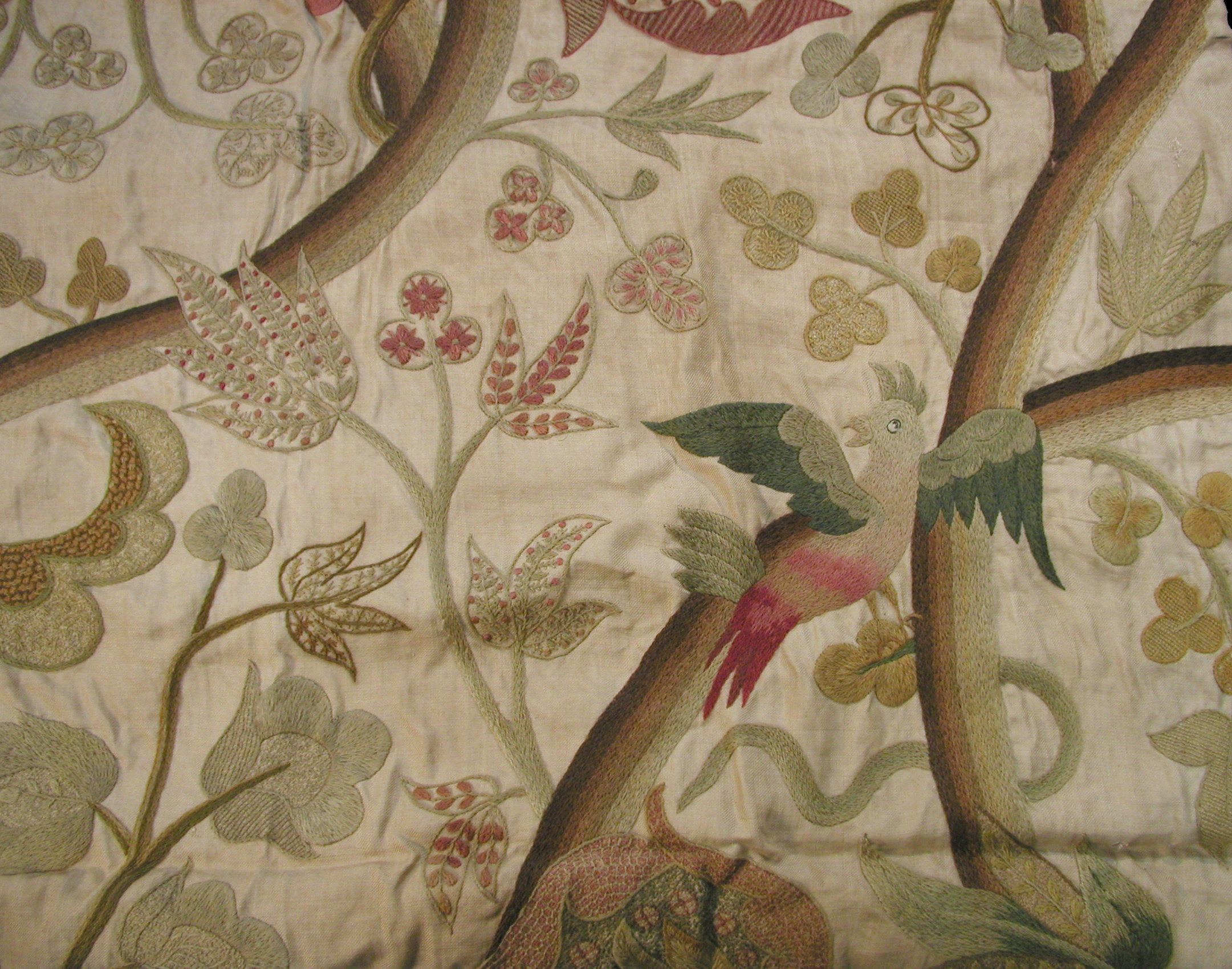
Bed hanging worked with crewel embroidery, Auckland Museum

For bed hangings decorated at home, the colors of the embroidery depended on what was available for use, or what could be dyed. Those who had access to a full range of colors could embroider realistic floral designs, while others would select or be limited to a monochromatic color scheme. Blue and rose and blue and white were popular in the American colonies, with the blue dye coming from the household's indigo pot. The designs used varied with the country and the time period. Elizabethan designs had scrolling vines and animal patterns, Jacobean designs might be predominantly leaves. About the turn of the 17th century, chinoiserie design elements became popular. By the mid 1700s, designs were more natural and included pictorial elements, such as animals.

== Artifacts ==
According to Hedlund, it is possible that few pieces of 17th century crewel bed hangings survive because women did not have the leisure time to work on them. More have survived from the 18th century. Few full sets of bed hangings were passed down intact, because their worth often meant they were divided amongst surviving heirs. In the New England in the US, the great bed and its hangings went to the eldest son, but if the bed hangings were embroidered, the bed might go to the eldest son and the hangings would be divided amongst the other children. Some pieces that still exist may never have been part of a full set. Later in the Colonial period some sets of hangings were smaller, including only side curtains at the head of the bed and valances.

=== Examples ===
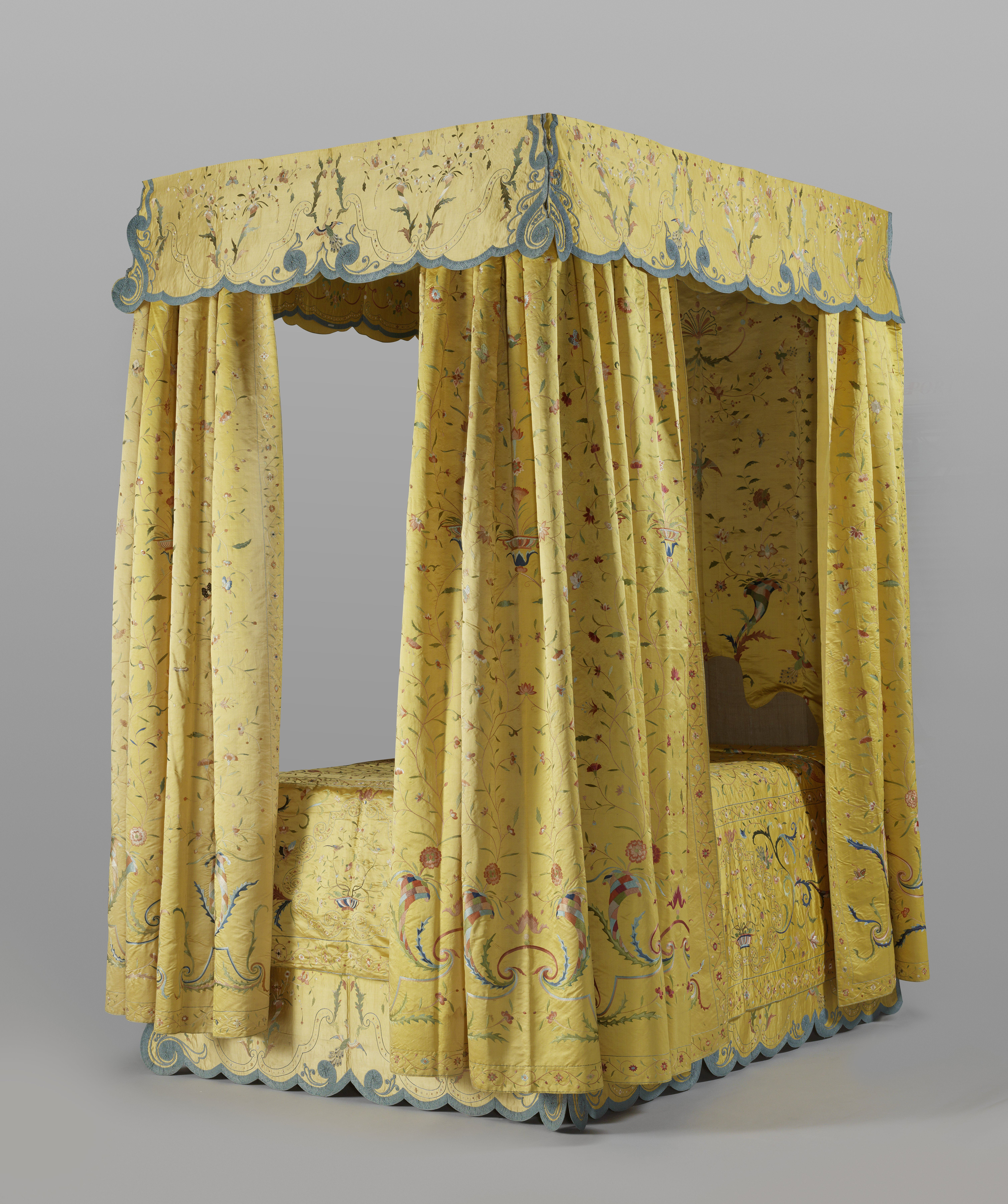
Embroidered silk bed hangings, China, c. 1760–1770, Rijksmuseum

In Great Britain, an embroidered valance made for Colin Campbell of Glenorchy and Katherine Ruthven including their initials and depicting Adam and Eve, is now at the Burrell Collection in Glasgow. They married in 1550 and the valance was used at Balloch. It was worked with silk threads on linen canvas, probably by a professional embroiderer in Scotland. The Oxburgh Hangings, hanging in Oxburgh Hall, were embroidered by Mary, Queen of Scots and Bess of Hardwick between 1570 and approximately 1585.

In 1597 the German traveller Paul Hentzner was shown a tester at Hampton Court which Anne Boleyn had embroidered as a gift for Henry VIII, this is not known to have survived. The Burrell Collection has a cream silk taffeta valance decorated with black velvet cutwork including the initials of Henry and Anne Boleyn, and their emblems of acorns and honeysuckle. The Tudor valance was preserved at Kimberly Hall by the Wodehouse family, who were relations of Anne Boleyn. A silk fabric-hung bed for Mary of Guise in a style of 1540 was recreated from inventory evidence in 2010 for display at Stirling Castle.

In the United States, the only complete set of embroidered bed hangings are those made by Mary Bulman, most likely in the 1730s, which are housed in the Old Gaol Museum in York, Maine. This set includes "four curtains, a coverlet, a headcloth, tester, outer valences, and inner valences." These inner valences contained an embroidered poem by Isaac Watts, "Meditation in a Grove." These valences would hang inside the bed curtains, where they could be read while in bed. When Mary's husband died in 1745, his probate inventory listed the value of the bed hangings as 20 pounds, which was the same amount as a 10-acre piece of land also in the inventory.

A set of bed hangings donated to the Museum of Fine Arts, Boston by Samuel Bradstreet, a descendant of the early American poet Anne Bradstreet, were worked in crewel in a pattern of large floral designs, and were likely made in the second quarter of the 1700s.

The New Elizabethan Embroidery Project created a new set of bed hangings in the Elizabethan style for the 16th century bed in the Grand Tudor chamber in Sulgrave Manor, the ancestral home of George Washington, the first president of the United States. Completed in 2007 by stitchers in both the US and the UK, the designs were inspired by motifs and symbols found elsewhere in the house.

The Rijksmuseum in Amsterdam has an almost complete set of 18th-century Chinese silk embroidered bed hangings, missing only the tester and the headboard. The designs include peacocks, flowering vines, foliage, butterflies, and vases of flowers. Created for the export trade, the set is extremely luxurious and was designed for a state bed, one meant to be seen.

== See also ==
- Canopy bed
- Box-bed
