= Surface embroidery =

Work in which threads lie on top of fabric

Surface embroidery is any form of embroidery in which the pattern is worked by the use of decorative stitches and laid threads on top of the foundation fabric or canvas rather than through the fabric; it is contrasted with canvas work.

Much free embroidery is also surface embroidery, as are a few forms of counted-thread embroidery such as cross stitch.

== Forms of surface embroidery ==
- Applique
- Art needlework
- Crewel embroidery
- Cross stitch
- Goldwork
- Jacobean embroidery
- Stumpwork

== Examples of surface embroideries ==
- Bayeux Tapestry
- Quaker tapestry
