= Crewel (novel) =

2012 novel by Gennifer Albin

- Cover of the 2012 US release
- Author: Gennifer Albin
- Cover artist: Christian Funfhausen
- Language: English
- Series: Crewel World
- Publisher: Farrar, Straus and Giroux
- Publication date: October 16, 2012
- Publication place: United States
- Media type: Print (hardback), e-book)
- Pages: 368 pp (first edition, hardback)
- ISBN: 0374316414 (first edition, hardback)
- Followed by: Altered

Crewel is a 2012 young adult dystopian fantasy novel by Gennifer Albin. The book is Albin's debut novel and is the first entry in her Crewel World trilogy. Crewel was released on October 16, 2012, by Farrar, Straus and Giroux and follows a young girl in a dystopian society that is pulled from her family due to her ability as a Spinster to manipulate the world via weaving. Albin stated that she came up with the idea of using the term "Spinsters" while comparing the term for old maids with that of the usage of the term to describe someone who spins wool. The following book in the series, Altered, was released on October 29, 2013.

== Synopsis ==
Crewel is a form of magical weaving. This marks her as someone that would be of interest to the people who run Arras, as the world is completely dependent on the Guild to manipulate the world and bring in food and good weather. Every year Arras's Manipulation Services performs a test on girls of a specific age, looking to see if they have the ability to manipulate. The girls that show promise are taken away in the night and put to work weaving the world around them. Adelice's parents knew of Adelice's abilities and tried to hide her talents, only for Adelice to accidentally reveal them during the testing period. Her parents try to hide her, only for the Guild to attack the family, seemingly killing Adelice's parents and carting away her little sister. She's told that if she cooperates, her sister will be fine. However, in a world where your entire personality can be re-woven to turn you into someone else and anyone can be removed from the world entirely at the whims of Arras's government, Adelice soon finds that not everything is as it seems and discovers a secret capable of destroying everything she holds dear.

== Reception ==
Initial critical reception for Crewel has been mixed to positive, with Redbook listing the book as a recommended read. Kirkus Reviews praised the book's premise, but wrote that it was "undermined by inconsistent worldbuilding, fuzzy physics, pedestrian language, characters who never move beyond stereotype and subplots that go nowhere". Publishers Weekly also commented that the reality-weaving can get "murky" but that "it's easily forgiven as the plot races along".
