= Stumpwork =

Embroidery technique

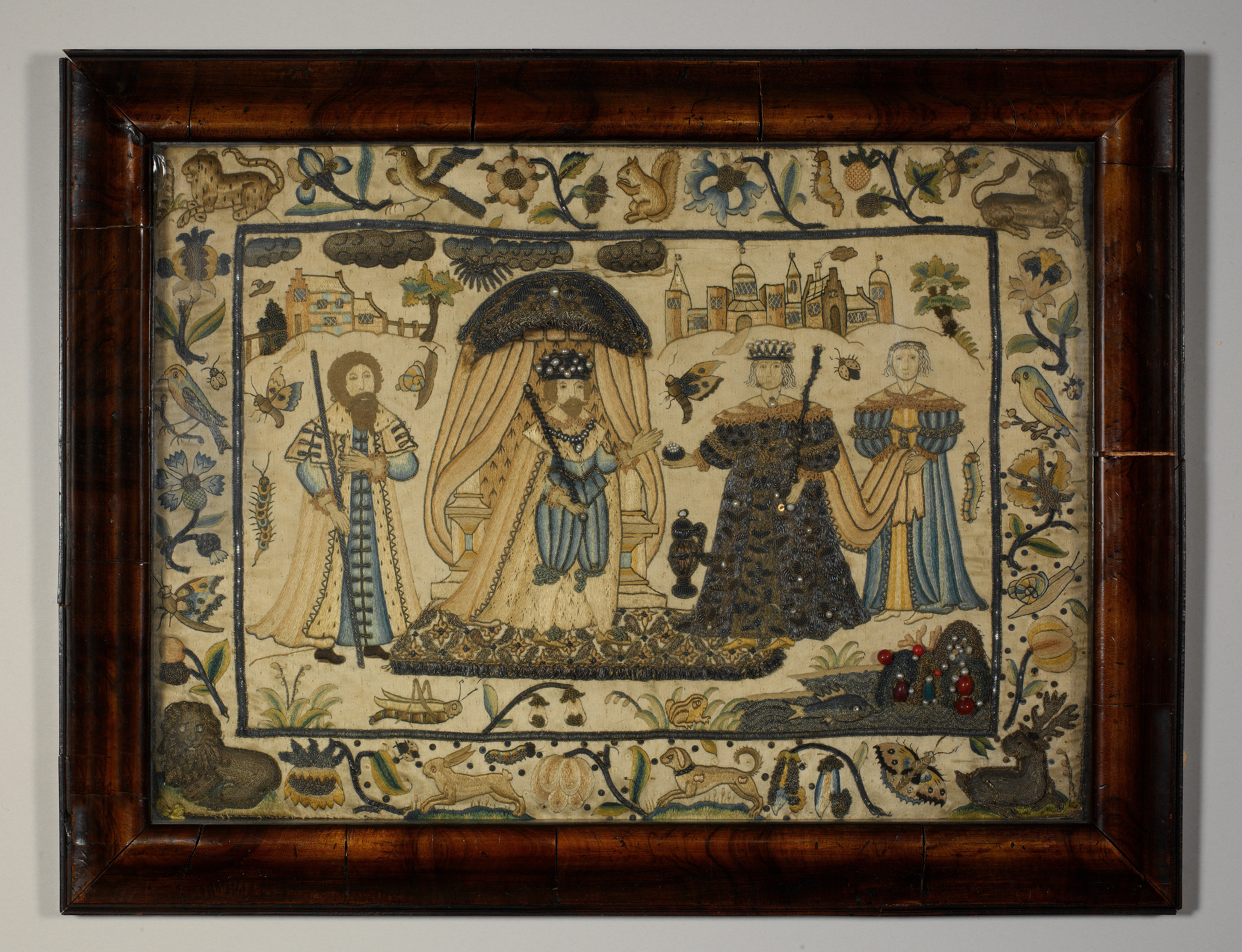
Stumpwork picture worked in silk and metal thread on silk, with pearls and beads, 17th century

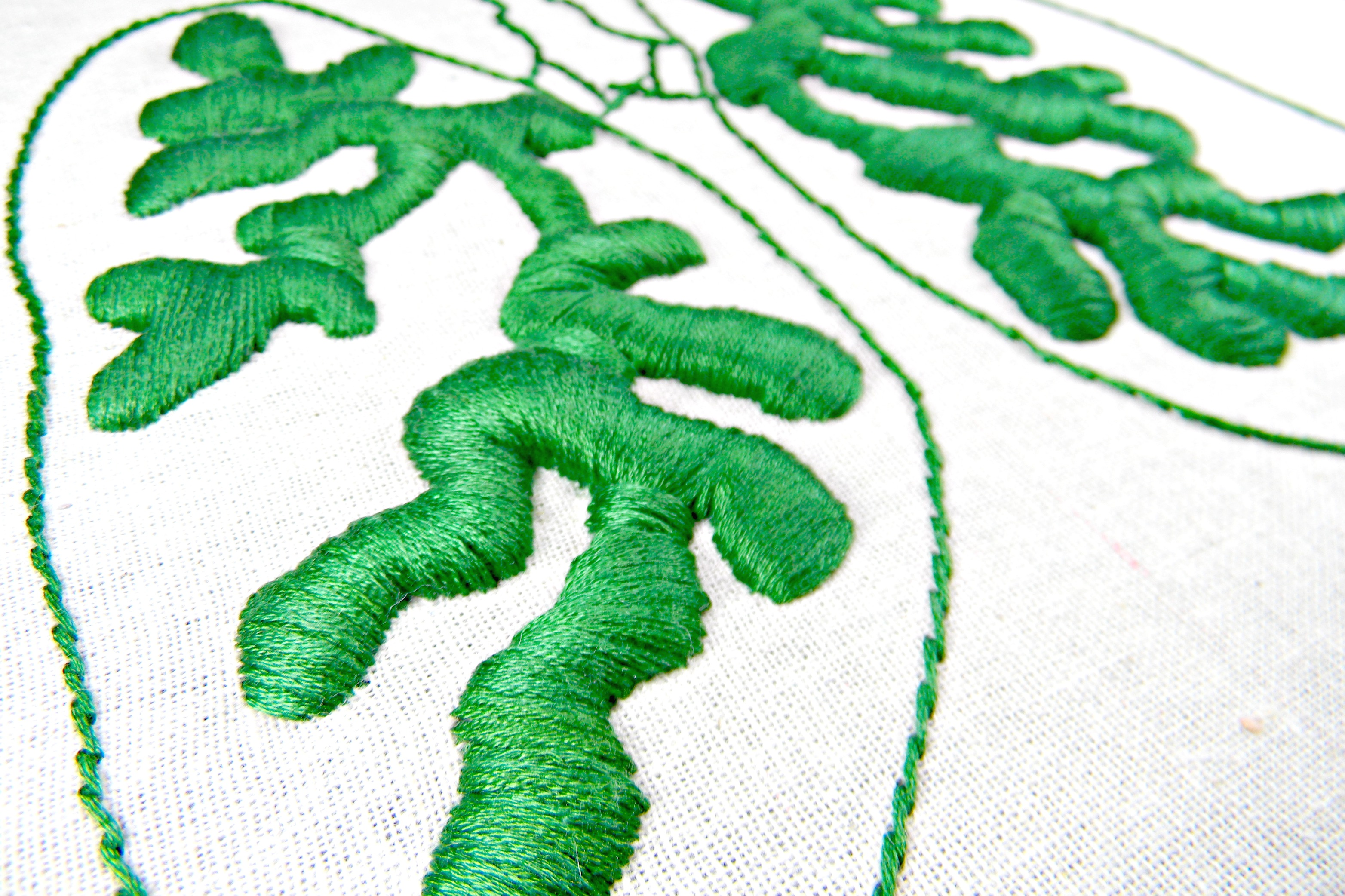
An anatomical embroidery of the lungs using stumpwork to give depth

Stumpwork or raised work is a style of embroidery in which the stitched figures are raised from the surface of the work to form a 3-dimensional effect.

== History ==
The term stumpwork is used to describe a style of raised embroidery which was popular in England between 1650 and 1700. Before this period the use of such raised embroidery techniques was mostly confined to ecclesiastical garments. In the seventeenth century this embroidery technique was simply called raised or embossed work. It has been called stumpwork only since around the end of the nineteenth century.

Sewing skills were essential for women in past times and the seventeenth century was no exception. Girls were taught to sew from an early age. Most women used these skills to make clothing and household linen items for their families. In wealthy households, where time and money were available and more luxurious materials could be accessed, the skills were also used for embroidery. During this period the final most difficult task for the student of embroidery was the making of an elaborate casket or box depicting scenes using raised embroidery.

Traditionally stumpwork depicted a scene which might contain a castle, stag, lion, birds, butterflies, fruit, flowers, and several figures sometimes positioned beneath a canopy. The kings and queens of the Stuart period were often depicted as were biblical or mythical stories.

== Technique and materials ==
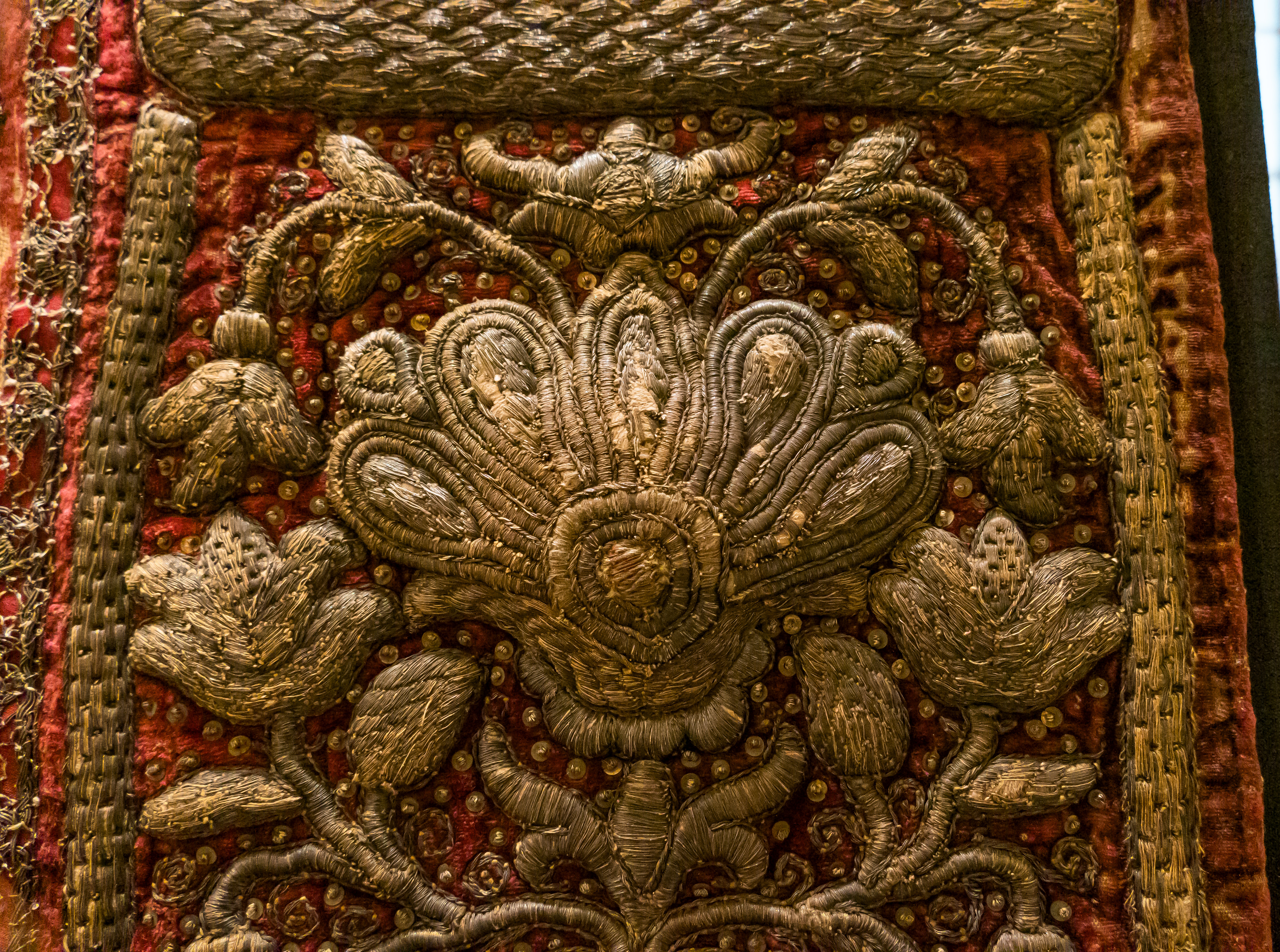
17th-century metalwork stumpwork with variety in the height of the padding, worked on silk, with spangles

Stitches can be worked around pieces of wire to create individual forms such as leaves, insect wings or flower petals. This form is then applied to the main body of work by piercing the background fabric with the wires and securing tightly. Other shapes can be created using padding under the stitches, usually in the form of felt layers sewn one upon the other in increasingly smaller sizes. The felt is then covered with a layer of embroidery stitches.

A wide variety of materials was used in these works including silver and gold thread, fine gimp cord, silk thread, chenille thread, wool, ribbon, wire, seed pearls, semi-precious stones, glass beads, coral, sea shells, mother-of-pearl, leather, feathers, vellum, boxwood, ivory and wax.

Upon completion of the embroidery for a seventeenth century casket project the work was sent to a carpenter to be mounted and assembled. A fine example of a casket from the period is held by the Victoria and Albert Museum in London.

Mrs Maggie Dunne wearing bodice with raised embroidery 1909

== Modern stumpwork ==
Raised embroidery or stumpwork has continued to be popular with embroiderers into modern times. In the late nineteenth century and early twentieth century, it was used to embellish women's clothing. Today skilled embroiderers carry on the craft in places across the globe using it to adorn objects in ever more creative ways.

A modern-day subcategory of this art form used primarily in production embroidery on automated embroidery machines is referred to as puff embroidery. The process involves putting down, typically, a layer of foam rubber larger than the intended shape on top of the target material to be decorated. The shape is then embroidered on top of the foam rubber in such a way that the needle penetrations cut the foam rubber around the periphery of the shape. When the embroidery is finished the excess foam rubber is weeded (pulled away or cleaned off) from the design area, leaving the underlying foam rubber shape trapped under the embroidery stitches, resulting in a stumpwork effect.

Puff embroidery generally lacks the intricate design characteristics obtainable with true stumpwork techniques and is primarily seen on leisure wear, such as baseball caps, sweatshirts and jackets. Many times, the designs are used to portray company logos or team mascots.
