= Jacobean embroidery =

Embroidery style popular in early 17th century England

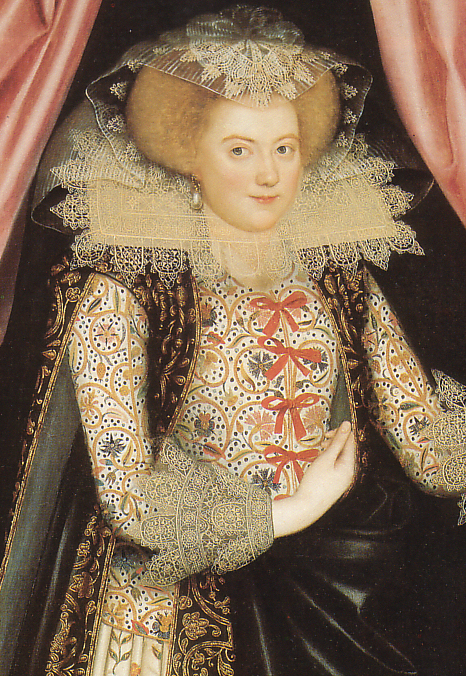
Embroidered linen jacket c. 1614-18

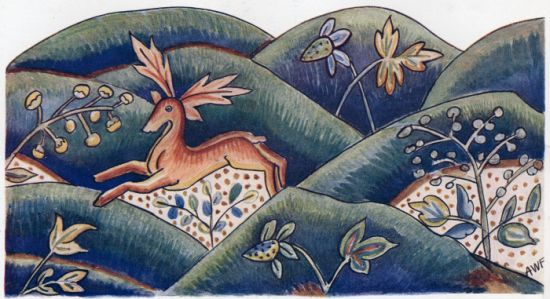
Sketch of a portion of the base or terra firma from an 18th(?) century curtain.

Jacobean embroidery refers to embroidery styles that flourished in the reign of King James I of England in first quarter of the 17th century.

The term is usually used today to describe a form of crewel embroidery used for furnishing characterized by fanciful plant and animal shapes worked in a variety of stitches with two-ply wool yarn on linen. Popular motifs in Jacobean embroidery, especially curtains for bed hangings, are the Tree of Life and stylized forests, usually rendered as exotic plants arising from a landscape or terra firma with birds, stags, squirrels, and other familiar animals.

== Origins ==
Early Jacobean embroidery often featured scrolling floral patterns worked in colored silks on linen, a fashion that arose in the earlier Elizabethan era. Embroidered jackets were fashionable for both men and women in the period 1600-1620, and several of these jackets have survived.

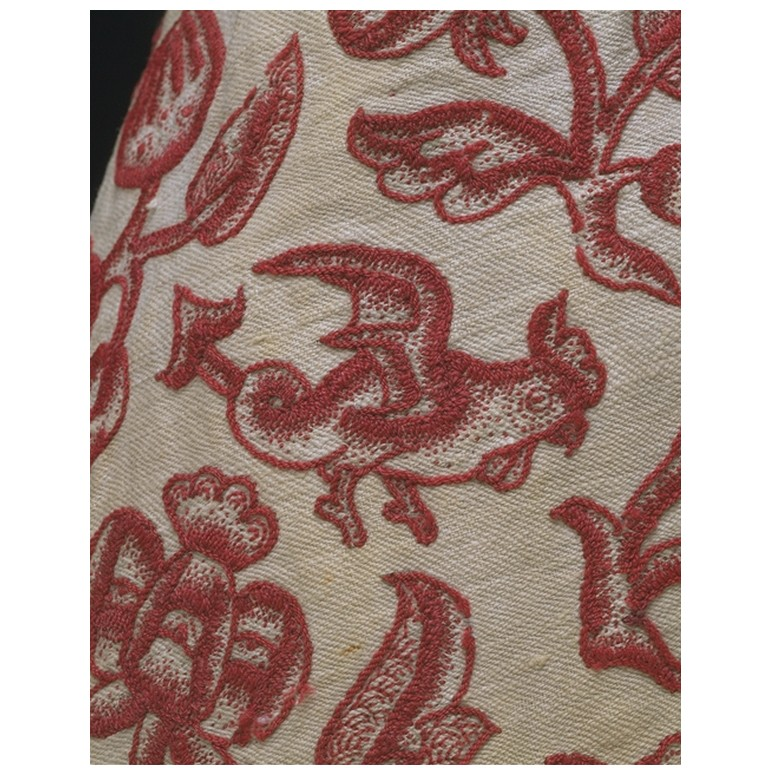
Crewel work on cotton and linen twill ground; stem stitch with long, short and coral stitches and French knots, 1630s V&A Museum no.T.124-1938

== Designs ==
Often based on tree of life imagery, curving branches with large flowers were a typical design. Early crewel embroideries exclusively used wool thread on linen (modern crewel embroidery encompasses a broader range with the only requirement being extensive use of crewel stitch variations).

== Legacy ==
Jacobean embroidery was carried by British colonists to Colonial America, where it flourished. The Deerfield embroidery movement of the 1890s revived interest in colonial and Jacobean styles of embroidery.

=== Gallery ===
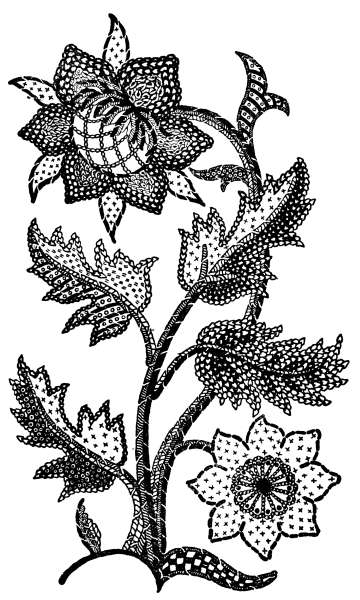
Pattern of a slip with flowers taken from a 17th-century embroidered curtain

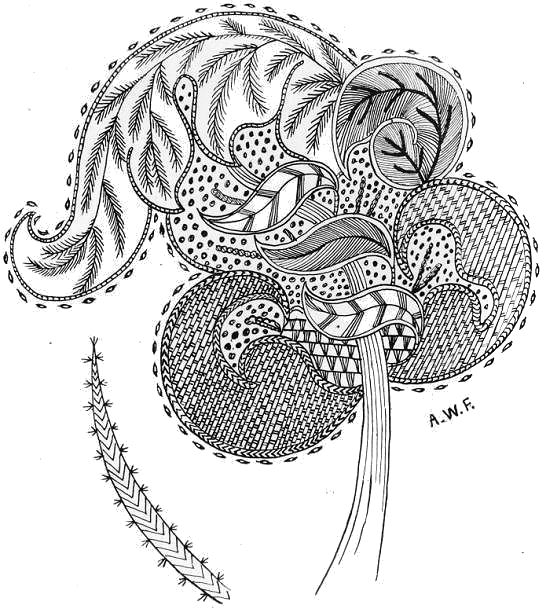
Design of a leaf from a bed curtain dated 1659, worked in blue, green, and yellow worsted wool yarn on linen.

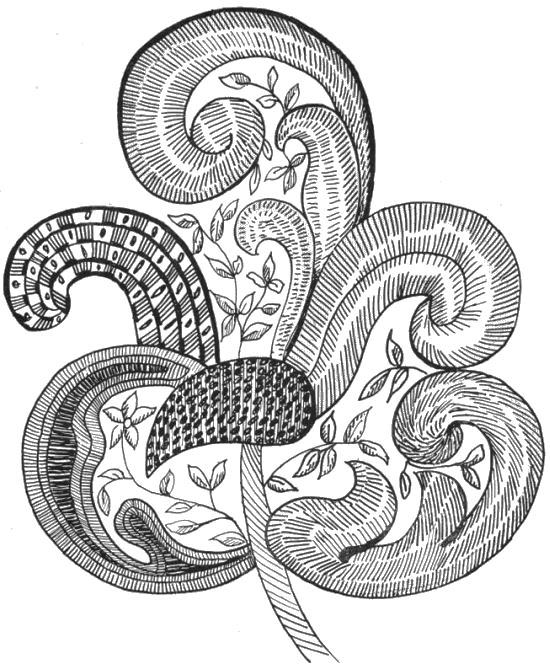
Sketch of a leaf worked in indigo, brown, and light green

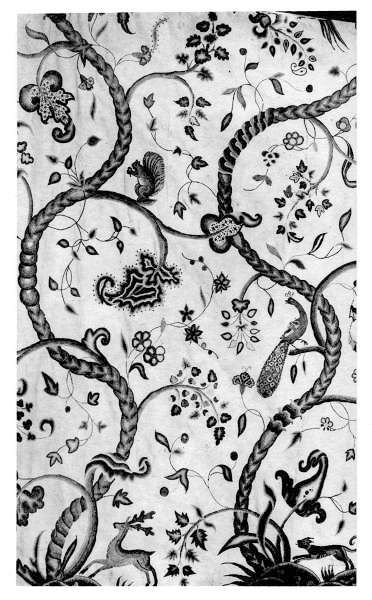
Portion of a 17th-century hanging "with a conventional representation

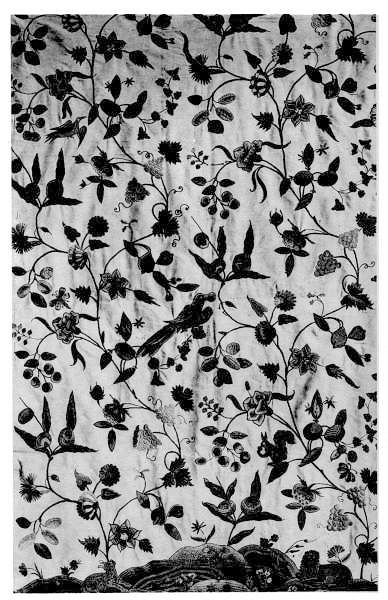
Embroidered wool-work curtain of the 17th or 18th century

== See also ==
- 1600–1650 in fashion
- Crewel embroidery
- Margaret Laton's embroidered jacket
- Christopher Shawe
- Oes
