= Heirloom sewing =

Collection of needlework techniques

Heirloom sewing is a collection of needlework techniques that arose in the last quarter of the 20th century that imitates fine French hand sewing of the period 1890–1920 using a sewing machine and manufactured trims.

Heirloom sewing is characterized by fine, often sheer, usually white cotton or linen fabrics trimmed with an assortment of lace, insertions, tucks, narrow ribbon, and smocking, imitating such hand-work techniques as whitework embroidery, Broderie Anglaise, and hemstitching.

Typical projects for heirloom sewing include children's garments (especially christening gowns), women's blouses, wedding gowns, and lingerie.
