= Cross-stitch =

Form of counted-thread embroidery

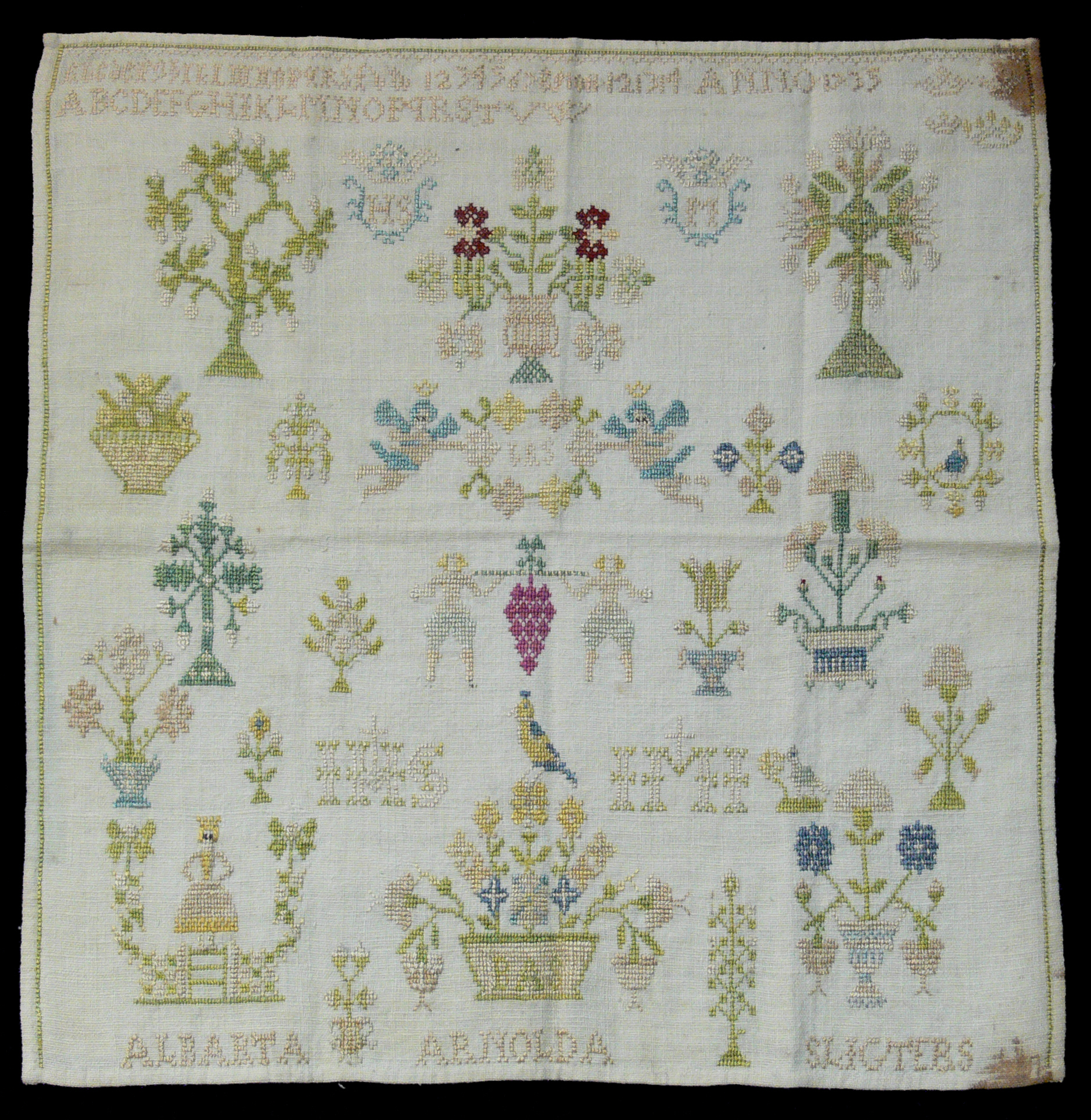
Cross-stitch sampler, Germany

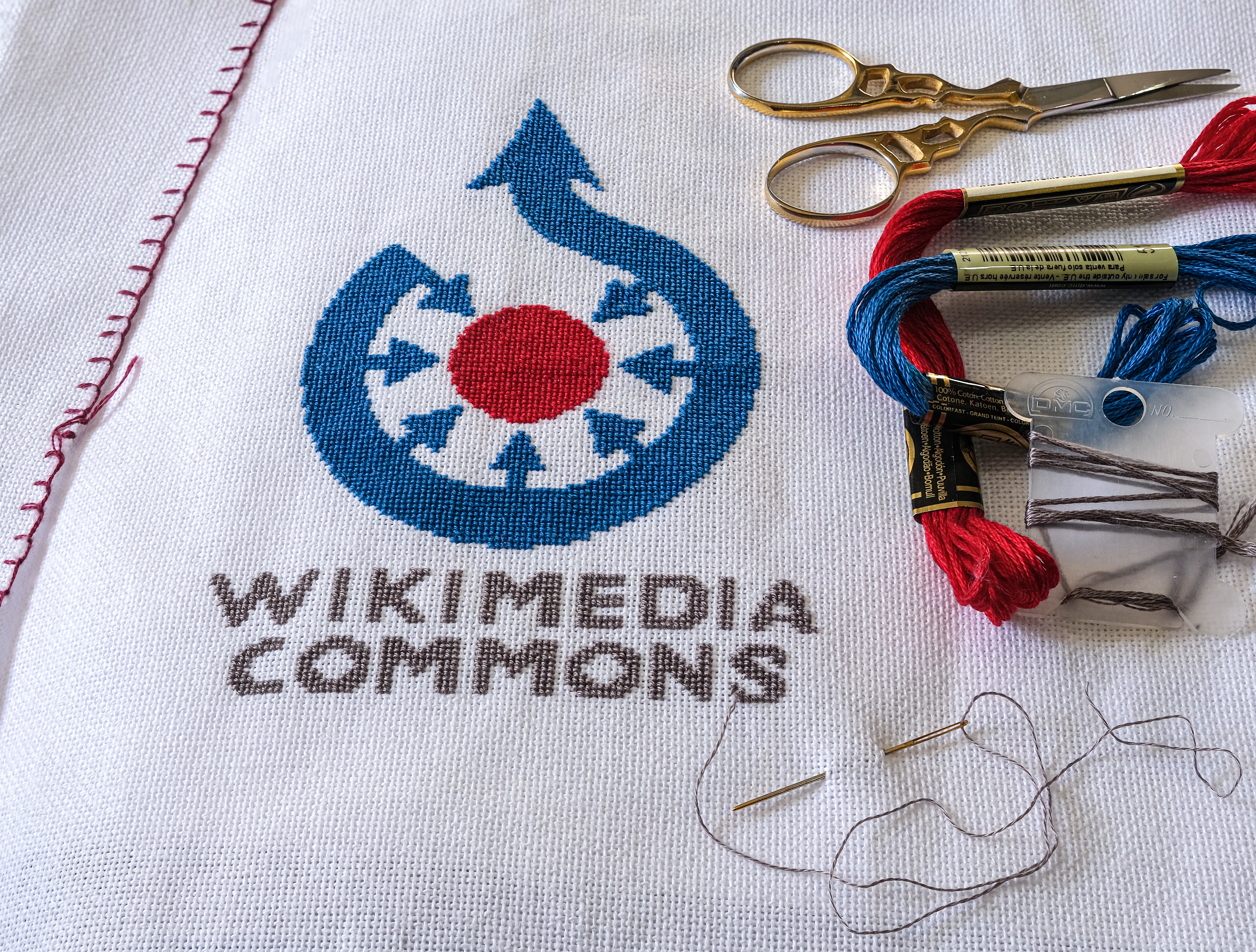
Example of a modern counted cross-stitch - Wikimedia Commons logo stitched on 28 count Aida cloth

Cross-stitch (also written ''cross stitch'') is a form of sewing and a popular form of counted-thread embroidery in which X-shaped stitches (called cross stitches) in a tiled, raster-like pattern are used to form a picture. The stitcher counts the threads or woven squares on a piece of evenweave fabric (such as linen or aida cloth), in each direction so that the stitches are of uniform size and appearance. This form of cross-stitch is also called counted cross-stitch in order to distinguish it from other forms of cross-stitch. Sometimes cross-stitch is done on designs printed on the fabric (stamped cross-stitch); the stitcher simply stitches over the printed pattern. Cross-stitch is often worked on easily countable fabric called aida cloth, whose weave creates a plainly visible grid of squares with holes for the needle at each corner.

Fabrics used in cross-stitch include linen, aida cloth, and mixed-content fabrics called 'evenweave' such as jobelan and lugana. All cross-stitch fabrics are technically "evenweave" as the term refers to the fact that the fabric is woven to make sure that there are the same number of threads per inch in both the warp and the weft (i.e. vertically and horizontally). Fabrics are categorized by threads per inch (referred to as 'count'), which can range from 11 to 40 count.

Counted cross-stitch projects are worked from a gridded pattern called a chart and can be used on any count fabric; the count of the fabric and the number of threads per stitch determine the size of the finished stitching. For example, if a given design is stitched on a 28-count cross-stitch fabric with each cross worked over two threads, the finished stitching size is the same as it would be on a 14-count aida cloth fabric with each cross worked over one square. These methods are referred to as "2 over 2" (2 embroidery threads used to stitch over 2 fabric threads) and "1 over 1" (1 embroidery thread used to stitch over 1 fabric thread or square), respectively. There are different methods of stitching a pattern, including the cross-country method where one colour is stitched at a time, or the parking method where one block of fabric is stitched at a time and the end of the thread is "parked" at the next point the same colour occurs in the pattern.

== History ==
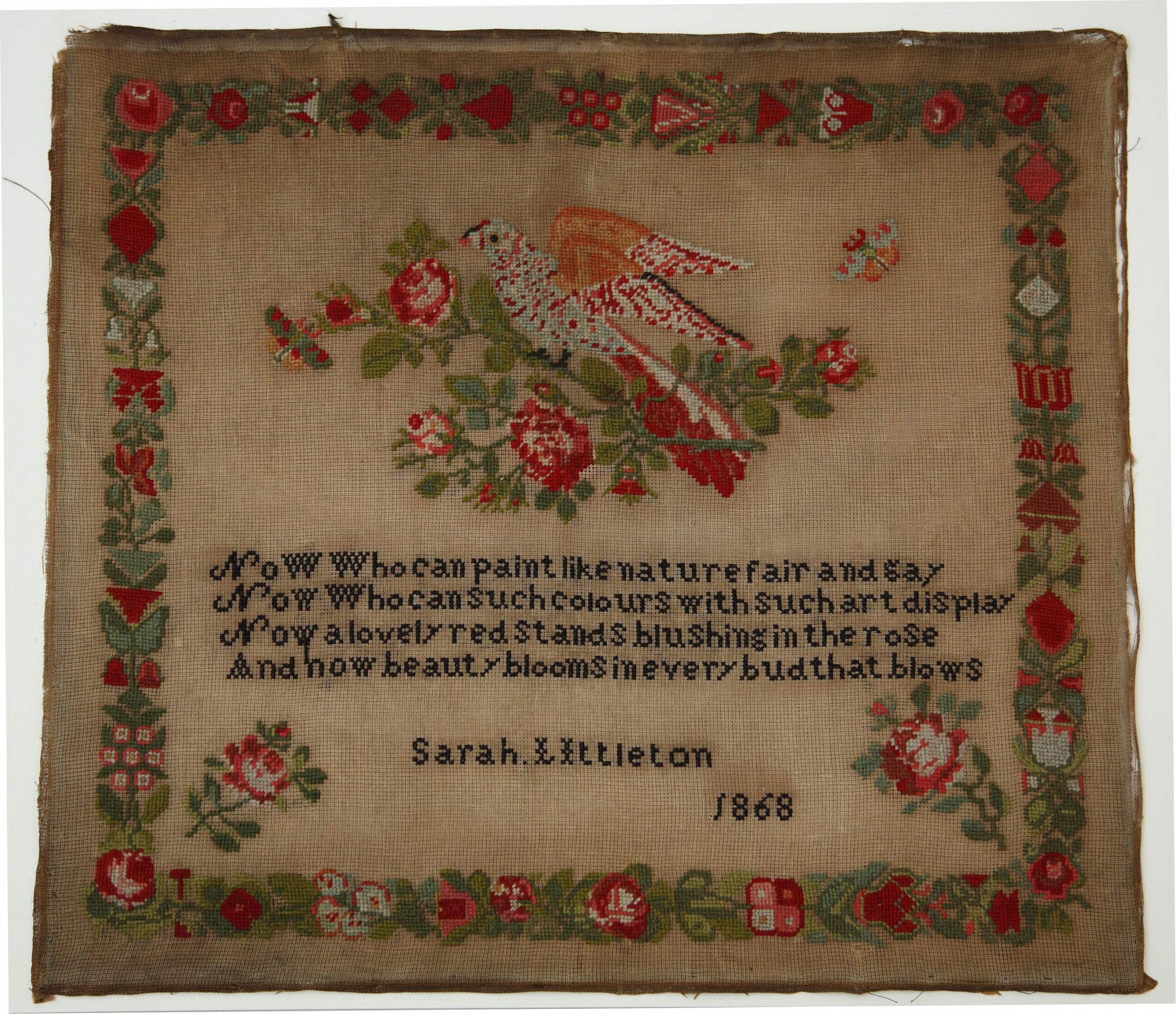
Cross-stitch sampler by Sarah Littleton, 1868

Cross-stitch can be found all over the world since the Middle Ages. Many folk museums show examples of clothing decorated with cross-stitch, especially from continental Europe and Asia.

The cross-stitch sampler is called that because it was generally stitched by a young girl to learn how to stitch and to record alphabet and other patterns to be used in her household sewing. She could then refer back to these samples of her stitching over the years. Often, motifs and initials were stitched on household items to identify their owner, or simply to decorate the otherwise-plain cloth. The earliest known cross-stitch sampler made in the United States is currently housed at Pilgrim Hall in Plymouth, Massachusetts. The sampler was created by Loara Standish, daughter of Captain Myles Standish and pioneer of the Leviathan stitch, circa 1653.

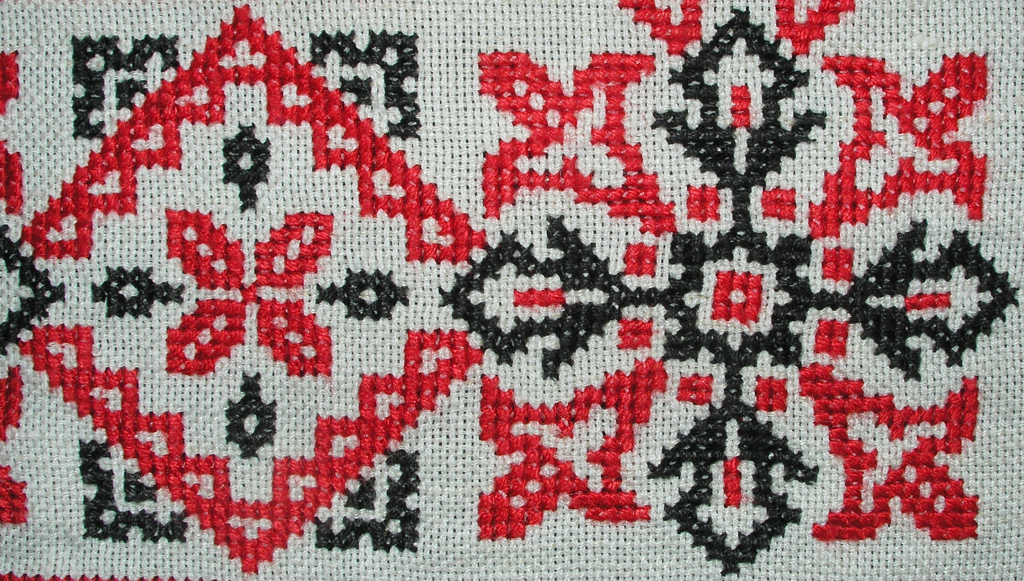
Detail of floral border pattern in cotton. Tea cloth (small tablecloth), Hungary, mid-twentieth century.

Traditionally, cross-stitch was used to embellish items like household linens, tablecloths, dishcloths, and doilies (only a small portion of which would actually be embroidered, such as a border). Although there are many cross-stitchers who still employ it in this fashion, it is now increasingly popular to work the pattern on pieces of fabric and hang them on the wall for decoration. Cross-stitch is also often used to make greeting cards or pillow tops, or as inserts for box tops, coasters and trivets.

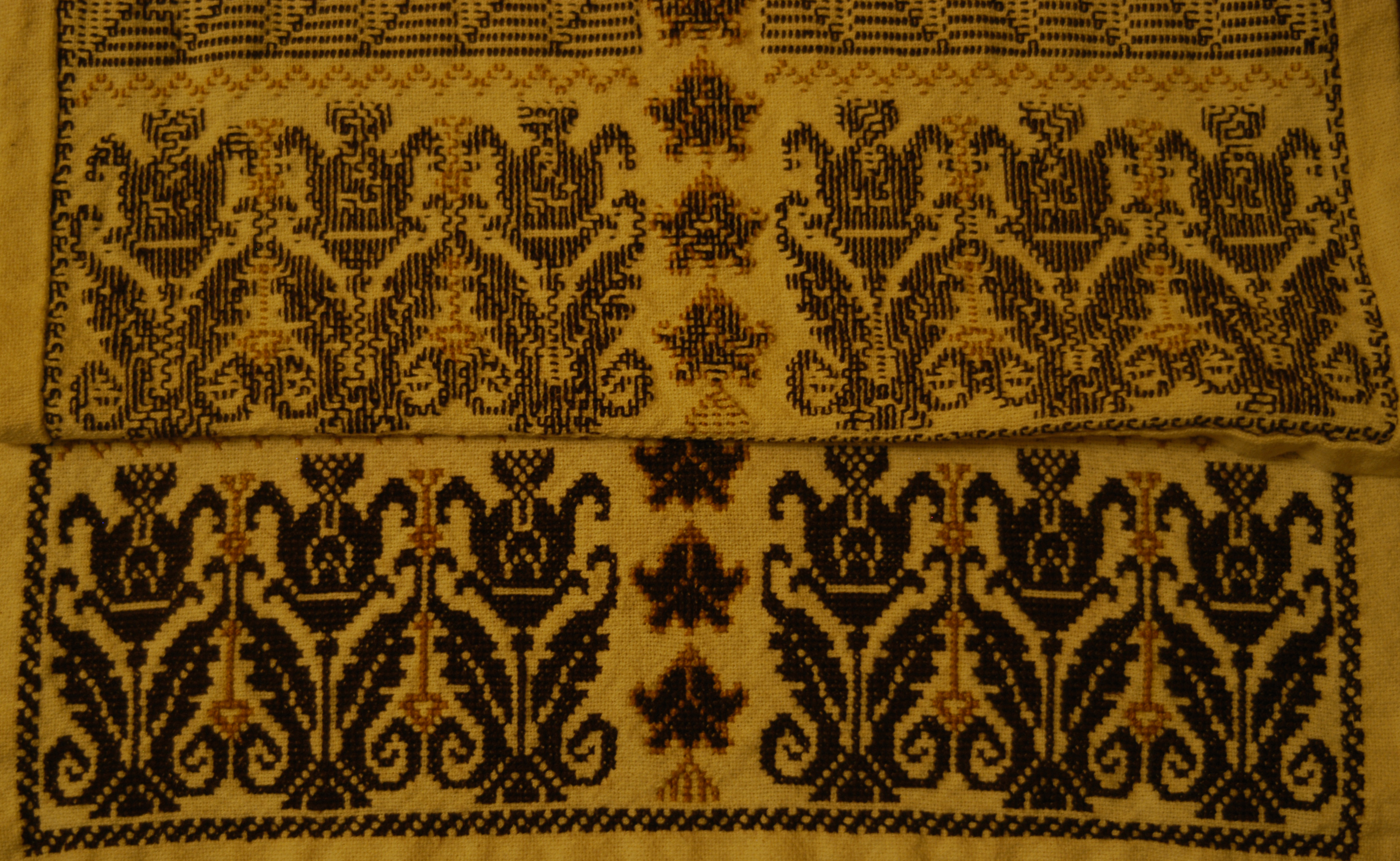
Cross-stitch from Surif. Top half of picture is the reverse side.

Multicoloured, shaded, painting-like patterns as we know them today are a fairly modern development, deriving from similar shaded patterns of Berlin wool work of the mid-nineteenth century. Besides designs created expressly for cross-stitch, there are software programs that convert a photograph or a fine art image into a chart suitable for stitching. One example of this is in the cross-stitched reproduction of the Sistine Chapel charted and stitched by Joanna Lopianowski-Roberts.

There are many cross-stitching "guilds" and groups across the United States and Europe which offer classes, collaborate on large projects, stitch for charity, and provide other ways for local cross-stitchers to get to know one another. Individually owned local needlework shops (LNS) often have stitching nights at their shops, or host weekend stitching retreats.

Today, cotton floss is the most common embroidery thread. It is a thread made of mercerized cotton, composed of six strands that are only loosely twisted together and easily separable. While there are other manufacturers, the two most-commonly used (and oldest) brands are DMC and Anchor, both of which have been manufacturing embroidery floss since the 1800s.

Other materials used are pearl (or perle) cotton, Danish flower thread, silk and Rayon. Different wool threads, metallic threads or other novelty threads are also used, sometimes for the whole work, but often for accents and embellishments. Hand-dyed cross-stitch floss is created just as the name implies—it is dyed by hand. Because of this, there are variations in the amount of color throughout the thread. Some variations can be subtle, while some can be a huge contrast. Some also have more than one color per thread.

Cross-stitch is widely used in traditional Palestinian dressmaking. Palestinian cross-stitch is called tatreez. In 2021, tatreez was added to the UNESCO List of the Intangible Cultural Heritage of Humanity.

== Related stitches and forms of embroidery ==
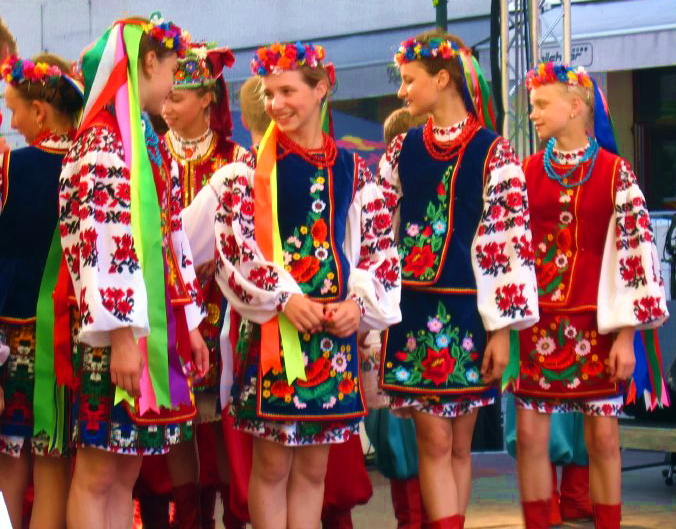
Ukrainian girls in traditional-style embroidered costumes

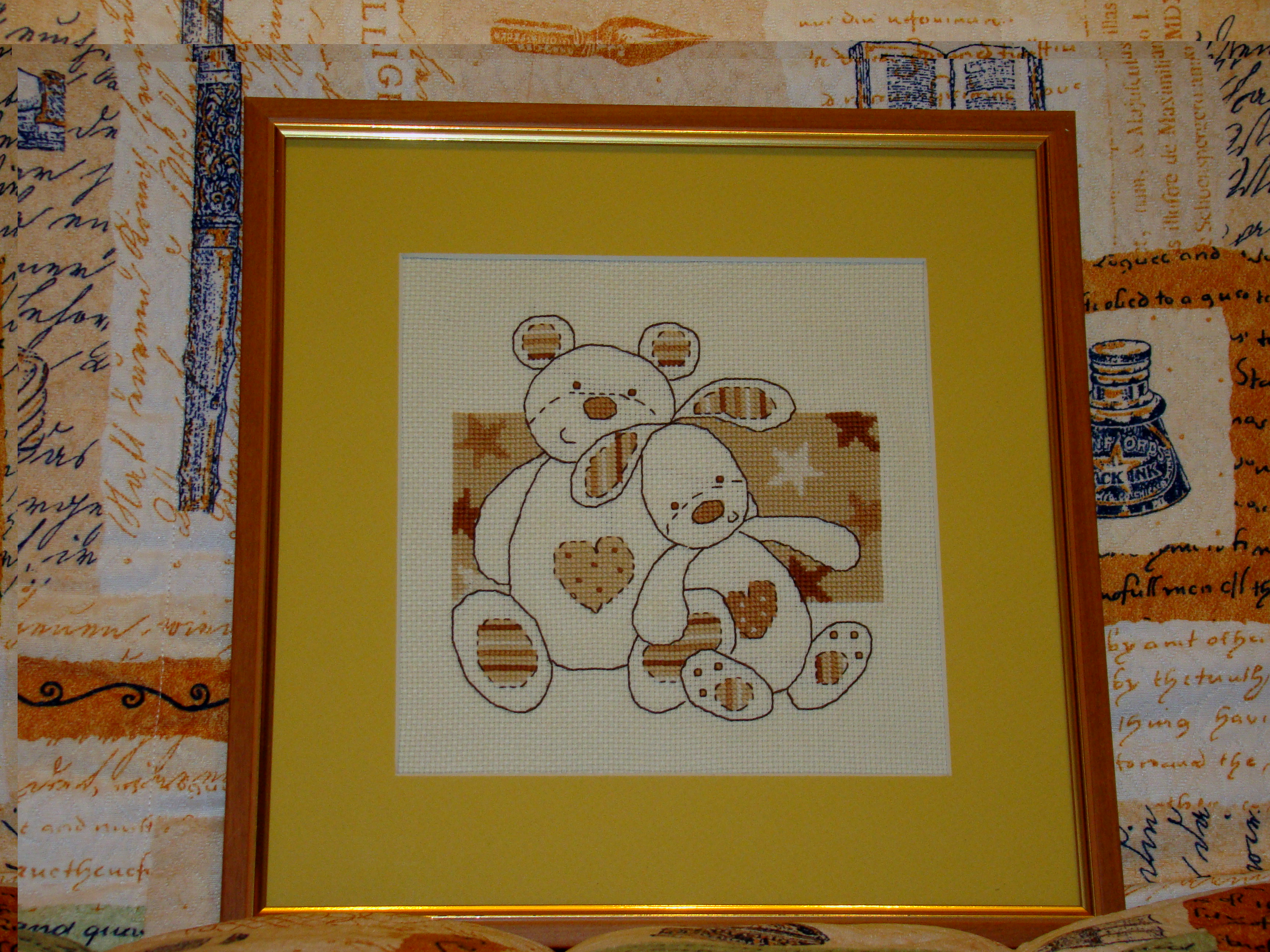
A cross-stitching created with the use of different color fabrics

The cross-stitch can be executed partially such as in quarter-, half-, and three-quarter-stitches. A single straight stitch, done in the form of backstitching, is often used as an outline, to add detail or definition.

There are many stitches which are related structurally to cross-stitch. The best known are Italian cross-stitch (as seen in Assisi embroidery), long-armed cross-stitch, and Montenegrin stitch. Italian cross-stitch and Montenegrin stitch are reversible, meaning the work looks the same on both sides. These styles have a slightly different look than ordinary cross-stitch. These more difficult stitches are rarely used in mainstream embroidery, but they are still used to recreate historical pieces of embroidery or by the creative and adventurous stitcher. The double cross-stitch, also known as a Leviathan stitch or Smyrna cross-stitch, combines a cross-stitch with an upright cross-stitch.

Berlin wool work and similar petit point stitchery resembles the heavily shaded, opulent styles of cross-stitch, and sometimes also used charted patterns on paper.

Cross-stitch is often combined with other popular forms of embroidery, such as Hardanger embroidery or blackwork embroidery. Cross-stitch may also be combined with other work, such as canvas work or drawn thread work. Beadwork and other embellishments such as paillettes, charms, small buttons and specialty threads of various kinds may also be used. Cross-stitch can often be used in needlepoint.

== Twenty first century cross-stitch trends ==
Cross-stitching sample

Cross-stitch has become increasingly popular with the younger generation of Europe in recent years. Retailers such as John Lewis experienced a 17% rise in sales of haberdashery products between 2009 and 2010. Hobbycraft, a chain of stores selling craft supplies, also enjoyed an 11% increase in sales over the year to February 22, 2009, primarily attributed to the needlework sector. The cross-stitch market has continued to grow and market research firm Mintel reported a 12% rise in women doing some sort of needlecraft as a hobby between 2015 and 2017. London department store Liberty's, reported double-digit growth in the fabric and haberdashery departments in 2017 and the store increased its range by 25%.

Knitting and cross-stitching have become more popular hobbies for a younger market, in contrast to its traditional reputation as a hobby for retirees. Sewing and craft groups such as Stitch and Bitch London have resurrected the idea of the traditional craft club. At Clothes Show Live 2010 there was a new area called "Sknitch" promoting modern sewing, knitting and embroidery.

In a departure from traditional designs, a contemporary trend has emerged featuring postmodern or tongue-in-cheek motifs in cross-stitch. This movement is closely associated with the concept of "subversive cross-stitch", a style that fuses the traditional sampler aesthetic—with its delicate borders of flowers and animals—with sayings and imagery designed to be shocking, humorous, or incongruous with the craft's old-fashioned image.

The modern trend's origin is widely credited to artist Julie Jackson, who founded her brand "Subversive Cross Stitch" in 2003. She later published a book of the same name to help popularise the movement. While this modern take is relatively new, the use of needlework as a medium for social commentary and subversion has a long history. This is explored in Rozsika Parker's 1984 book, The Subversive Stitch: Embroidery and the Making of the Feminine.

Stitching designs on other materials can be accomplished by using waste canvas. This is a temporary gridded canvas similar to regular canvas used for embroidery that is held together by a water-soluble glue, which is removed after completion of stitch design. Soluble canvas serves a similar purpose and is entirely dissolved in water after finishing a design. Other crafters have taken to cross-stitching on all manner of gridded objects as well including old kitchen strainers or chain-link fences.

While cross-stitch is traditionally a women's craft, it is growing in popularity among men.

== Cross-stitch and feminism ==
In the 21st century, an emphasis on feminist design has emerged within cross-stitch communities. Some cross-stitchers have commented on the way that the practice of embroidery makes them feel connected to the women who practised it before them. There is a push for all embroidery, including cross-stitch, to be respected as a significant art form.

== Cross-stitch and computers ==
The development of computer technology has also affected such a seemingly traditional craft as cross-stitch. With the help of computer visualization algorithms, it is now possible to create embroidery designs using a photograph or any other picture. Visualisation uses a drawing on a graphical grid, representing colors and / or symbols, which gives the user an indication of the possible use of colors, the position of those colors, and the type of stitch used, such as full cross or quarter stitch.

== Flosstube ==
An increasingly popular activity for cross-stitchers is to watch and make YouTube videos detailing their hobby. Flosstubers, as they are known, typically cover WIPs (Works in Progress), FOs (Finished Objects), and hauls (new patterns, thread, and fabric, as well as cross-stitching accessories, such as needle minders).

== See also ==
- Mosaic
- Pixel art
- Embroidery
- Tatreez
