= Hardanger embroidery =

Type of whitework embroidery from Norway

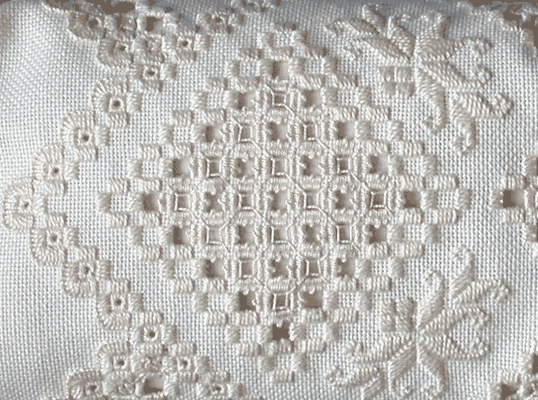
Example of modern Hardanger embroidery work

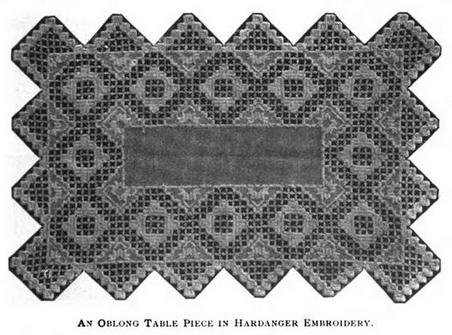
Hardanger embroidery sample, from a 1907 needlework magazine.

Hardanger embroidery or "Hardangersøm" is a form of embroidery traditionally worked with white thread on white even-weave linen or cloth, using counted thread and drawn thread work techniques. It is sometimes called whitework embroidery.

Hardanger embroidery gets its name from the district of Hardanger in western Norway, where it was known simply as hvitsøm (whitework). Traditionally, this geometric embroidery and cutwork technique was worked in white linen thread on handwoven white linen fabric and used only as trim on garments.

== History ==
In the period between 1650-1850 Hardangersom (meaning: work from Hardanger area) flourished in Norway. Flax was grown, carded, spun and woven into white fabric and thread which was used to make and decorate traditional Norwegian costume items called bunads (national costumes) as well as other items of clothing and household linens such as mats, curtains and bedspreads.

Hardanger is used on the bunad from the Hardanger region of Norway. It is usually found on the cuffs, collar and front yoke of the shirt, on the apron, and sometimes on a band around the pleated headdress.

== Materials and technique ==
=== Fabric ===
Historically, Hardanger employed linen evenweave fabric of 36 count or higher. Modern Hardanger fabric is an evenweave cotton material woven with pairs of threads, typically 22 pairs per linear inch in both directions, referred to as '22-count'. The weave gives a squared appearance to the fabric (similar to Aida cloth), with distinct holes, making it easy to count and work on. There is no requirement to stitch on so-called Hardanger fabric: any evenweave linen, cotton or synthetic fabric of any count can be used.

=== Threads ===
Traditional Hardanger embroidery is worked with linen thread colour that matches the fabric, usually white or cream. Using self-coloured thread enhances both the sculptural nature of the stitches and the details in the intricate filling stitches.

Modern Hardanger can employ a large variety of threads. Two weights of Pearl (perlé) cotton are generally used. On 22-count Hardanger fabric this is usually Pearl cotton #5, a heavier weight used for satin stitch Kloster blocks and motifs, and Pearl cotton #8, a thinner thread used for more delicate filling stitches and other surface details. On finer, higher count fabrics the combination of #8 and #12 threads is often more suitable. Many contemporary designs, however, do make use of coloured, variegated and overdyed threads to great effect.

=== Stitches and techniques ===
Hardanger embroidery uses satin stitch blocks known as Kloster blocks, consisting of 5 parallel satin stitches, worked over a group of 4 x 4 ground threads. These blocks enclose areas of fabric where a number of warp and weft threads are cut and withdrawn, leaving a network of loose threads and large holes within the shape defined by the Kloster blocks. Various decorative filling stitches are then worked over the remaining loose threads and holes to create a lacy effect.

Some of the stitches and special techniques used are:

- Simple satin stitch surface motifs, often resembling stars, ships, crescents and crosses.
- Other decorative surface stitches such as fly stitch, running stitch, cable stitch and French knots.
- Woven bars: weaving the needle over and under four threads until they are completely covered, and wrapped bars (overcast bars) where the thread is wound around groups of four threads.
- Filling stitches resembling wheels, spider's webs and dove's eyes.
- Picot: twisting the thread once round the needle before inserting the needle to produce a decorative loop.
- Edging stitches such as four-sided stitch, buttonhole stitch and fancy hemstitching techniques for finishing items.

=== Designs ===
The traditional style of Hardanger work is geometrical in form and based on basic shapes such as squares, rectangles, triangles, diamonds, hearts, zig-zags and crosses. The combination and placement of these elements allow an unlimited number of patterns of all sizes to be created.

A wide range of patterns are available today for the modern needleworker to try, in both traditional and contemporary styles. Hardanger is still used to decorate cushions, table linen and other household items as well as items for display on a wall. Several modern needlework designers have incorporated elements of Hardanger cut work into their embroidery designs and samplers, often combining them with other needlework techniques, stitches, speciality threads and other embellishments to great effect.

=== New uses ===
Some Lutheran pastors of Norwegian descent in the United States have had stoles embroidered with Hardanger work made for their use. While altar paraments in Hardanger work have been traditional in Norwegian churches for a long time, their use in American Lutheran churches is becoming more common as an alternative to the more traditional machine-embroidered damask paraments. Even the traditional alternating cross and chalice motif of Norwegian Hardanger work is now found in American Lutheran churches.
