= Hardanger (disambiguation) =

Hardanger may be:

- Hardanger, a region in Vestland, Norway, consisting of the municipalities of Ullensvang, Eidfjord, Ulvik and Voss
- Hardangerfjord, a fjord around which the landscape of Hardanger is centered
- A mountain plateau in Norway, Hardangervidda
- Hardanger fiddle, a Norwegian stringed instrument
- Hardanger embroidery, a form of whitework hand embroidery from the district of the same name
- Hardanger cloth, a special kind of evenweave fabric used for Hardanger embroidery and other counted-thread embroidery
