= Sampler (needlework) =

Textile artwork used to display skills and techniques

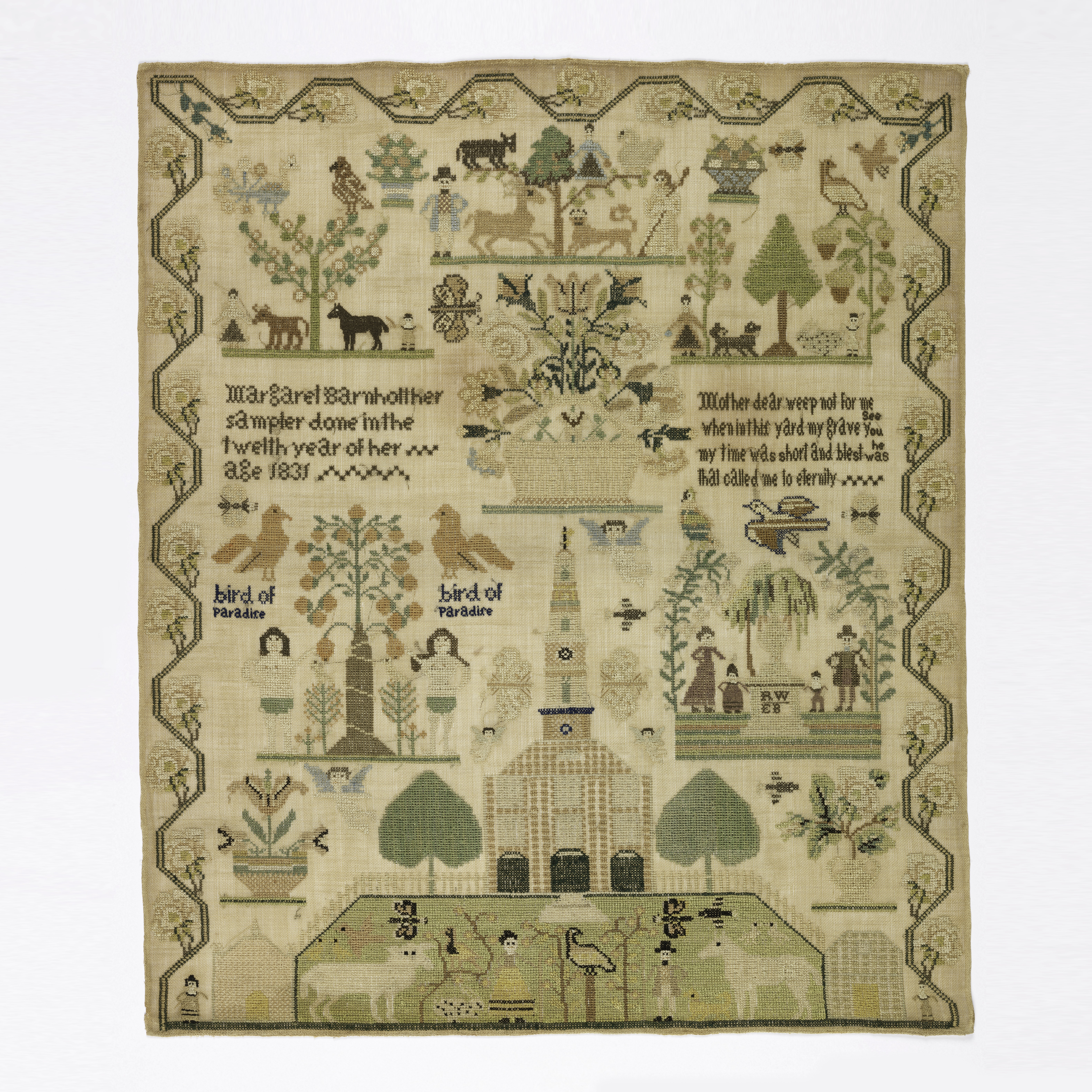
An American sampler: "Margaret Barnholt her sampler done in the twelth [sic] year of her age 1831".

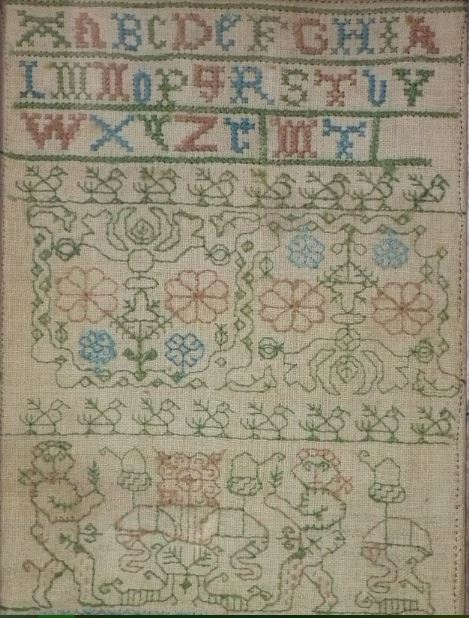
English band sampler featuring 'boxers', c. 1650

A needlework sampler is a piece of embroidery or cross-stitching produced as a 'specimen of achievement', demonstration or a test of skill in needlework. It often includes the alphabet, figures, motifs, decorative borders and sometimes the name of the person who embroidered it and the date. The word sampler is derived from the Latin exemplum, which means 'example'.

== History ==
The earliest sampler extant is a spot sampler, i.e. one having randomly scattered motifs, of the Nazca culture in Peru formerly in the Museum of Primitive Art, New York City. It is estimated to date from ca. 200 BCE –300 CE and is worked in cotton and wool pattern darning on a woven cotton ground. It has seventy-four figures of birds, plants and mythological beings.

Coptic sampler fragments of silk on linen in double running stitch and pattern darning have been found in Egyptian burial grounds of 400–500 CE. These are pattern samplers having designs based on early Christian symbols.

Samplers were known to be used by stitchers in Europe as early as the beginning of the 16th century, although none that early have been found. A collection of fifty dechados (samplers) was listed in the 1509 inventory of the possessions of Queen Joanna (Juana I, 1479–1555) of Castile (Spain). They were described as stitchery and deshilado (drawn thread work), some in silk and others in gold thread. At the time of the inventory they were in the care of her chamberlain Diego de Rivera and his son Alonso, but they have all disappeared.

Early mentions of samplers in text include Skelton (1469-1529), and Shakespeare (1564-1616).

The oldest surviving European samplers were made in the 16th and 17th centuries. As there were few pre-printed patterns available for needleworkers, a stitched model was needed. Whenever a needleworker saw a new and interesting example of a stitching pattern, they would quickly sew a small sample of it onto a piece of cloth – their 'sampler'. The patterns were sewn randomly onto the fabric as a reference for future use, and the needleworker would collect extra stitches and patterns throughout their lifetime.

The first printed pattern book Furm oder Modelbüchlein was published by Johann Schönsperger the Younger of Augsburg in 1523, but it was not easily obtainable and a sampler was the most common form of reference available to many women. Pattern books were widely copied and issued by other publishers. Some are still available in reprint today.

The earliest English dated surviving sampler, housed in the Victoria and Albert Museum in London, was made by Jane Bostocke who included her name and the date 1598 in the inscription. Stitched with silk and metal thread on linen it has pictorial figures above with border and all-over patterns below. The inscription reads:

JANE BOSTOCKE 1598
ALICE LEE WAS BORNE THE 23 OF NOVEMBER BE
ING TWESDAY IN THE AFTER NOONE 1596

The museum has two other samplers believed to date from the 16th century, one from Germany with religious motifs and one from Italy with floral patterns and grotesques. Both are worked in silk and linen.

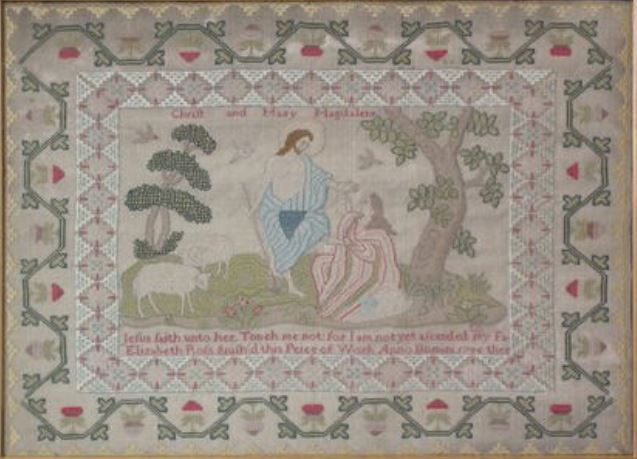
'Biblical' sampler by Elizabeth Ross dated 1786

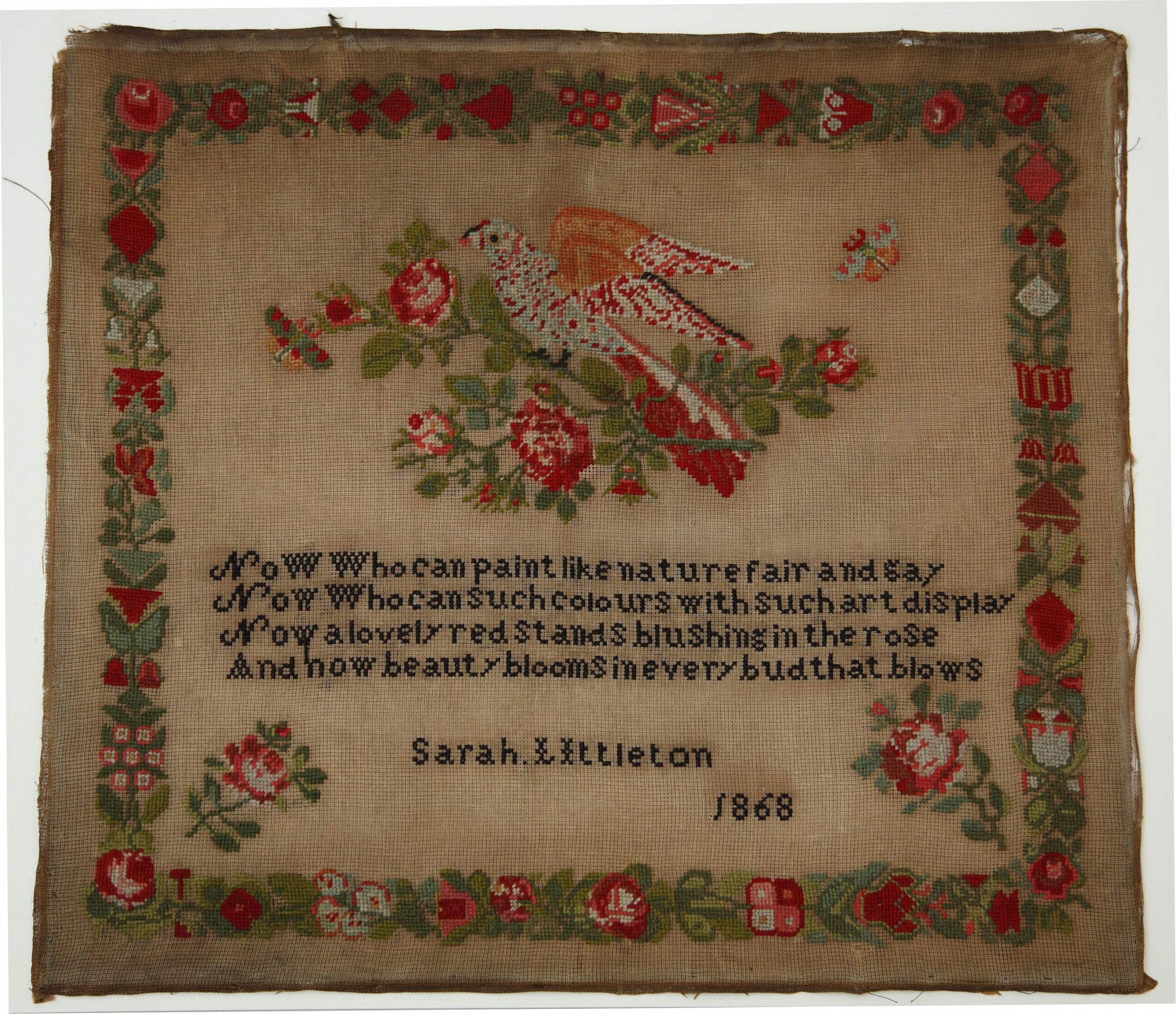
Berlin work sampler by Sarah Littleton, 1868

The oldest known embroidery sampler in the Netherlands is dated 1608.

A sampler in the Museum of London has two cutwork bands stitched in silk, gold, and silver threads and thirteen bands of reticella whitework in white linen thread. The fourth band from the top has the initials E R, the royal arms of Queen Elizabeth I, and the maker's name SUSAN NEGABRI in bold letters. It is believed to date before the queen's death in 1603.

Because very few samplers from the 16th century have been found it is not possible to generalize about their style and appearance. By the middle of the 17th century, English, Dutch, and German samplers were being stitched on a narrow band of fabric 6–9 in (150–230 mm) wide. Hand-woven linen, bleached or unbleached, is the foundation material of early samplers. As fabric was very expensive, these samplers were totally covered with neat rows of stitches. They were known as band samplers and valued highly, often being mentioned in wills and passed down through the generations. These samplers were stitched using a variety of needlework styles, threads, and ornament. Many of them were exceedingly elaborate, incorporating subtly shaded colours, silk and metallic embroidery threads, and using stitches such as Hungarian, Florentine, tent, cross, long-armed cross, two-sided Italian cross, rice, running, Holbein, Algerian eye and buttonhole stitches. The samplers also incorporated small designs of flowers and animals, and geometric designs stitched using as many as 20 different colors of thread. Some were stitched partially or entirely in whitework.

Band samplers were more decorative than the utilitarian random motif spot samplers, and stitchers finished them by adding their names, dates of completion, and sometimes teacher or school names. As the work of sampler making moved into schools in the late 17th and early 18th centuries design styles changed. Alphabets and verses were added along with pictorial elements such as architectural motifs, landscapes, and large potted plants. Educational themes included maps, multiplication tables, perpetual calendars, and acrostic puzzles. The earliest samplers from Barbados date from 1771 (held by the Royal School of Needlework), made by Martha Collymore, with another made by Jane Rollstone Alleyne in 1777 owned by the Victoria and Albert Museum. Both have a band following much earlier 17th-century sampler patterns, and are presumed to be created under the tutelage of the same teacher, using older reference materials from earlier generations of white colonisers on the island.

By the 18th century, samplers were a complete contrast to the scattered samples sewn earlier on. They became wider and more square, eventually with borders on all four sides. Samplers were mainly school exercises or mourning samplers during the 18th and 19th centuries, and were almost entirely worked in cross stitch.

By the nineteenth century, English samplers had become primarily schoolroom exercises, often worked almost entirely in cross-stitch. Earlier samplers had served as reference collections of stitches and patterns for later embroidery projects.

Design styles were increasingly influenced by Berlin woolwork which became popular worldwide, due to the availability of patterns, initially emanating from Berlin, Germany. This style of needlework reached its height of popularity between the 1830s and 1870s. These samplers were stitched more to demonstrate knowledge than to preserve skill. The stitching of samplers was believed to be a sign of virtue, achievement and industry, and girls were taught the art from a young age.

Berlin woolwork designs had naturalistic shading and more depth of perspective than the flat two-dimensional objects on traditional needlework. By mid-19th century adult needleworkers were devising long and narrow stitch samplers having geometric patterns done in woolwork. The Art Needlework movement and elimination of samplers from female education brought about the decline in traditional sampler making that continued into the 20th century.

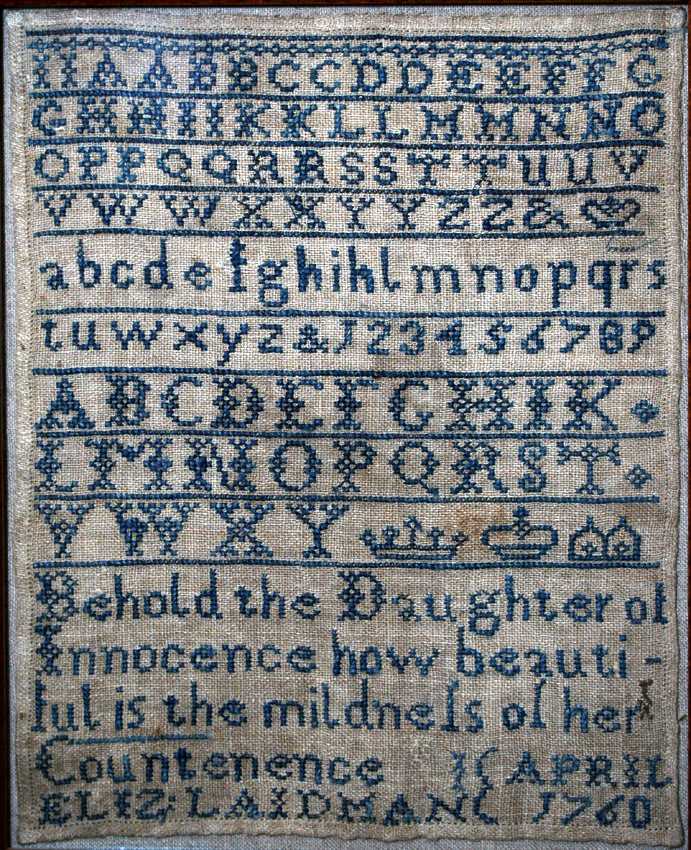
Cross-stitch alphabet sampler worked by Elizabeth Laidman, 1760

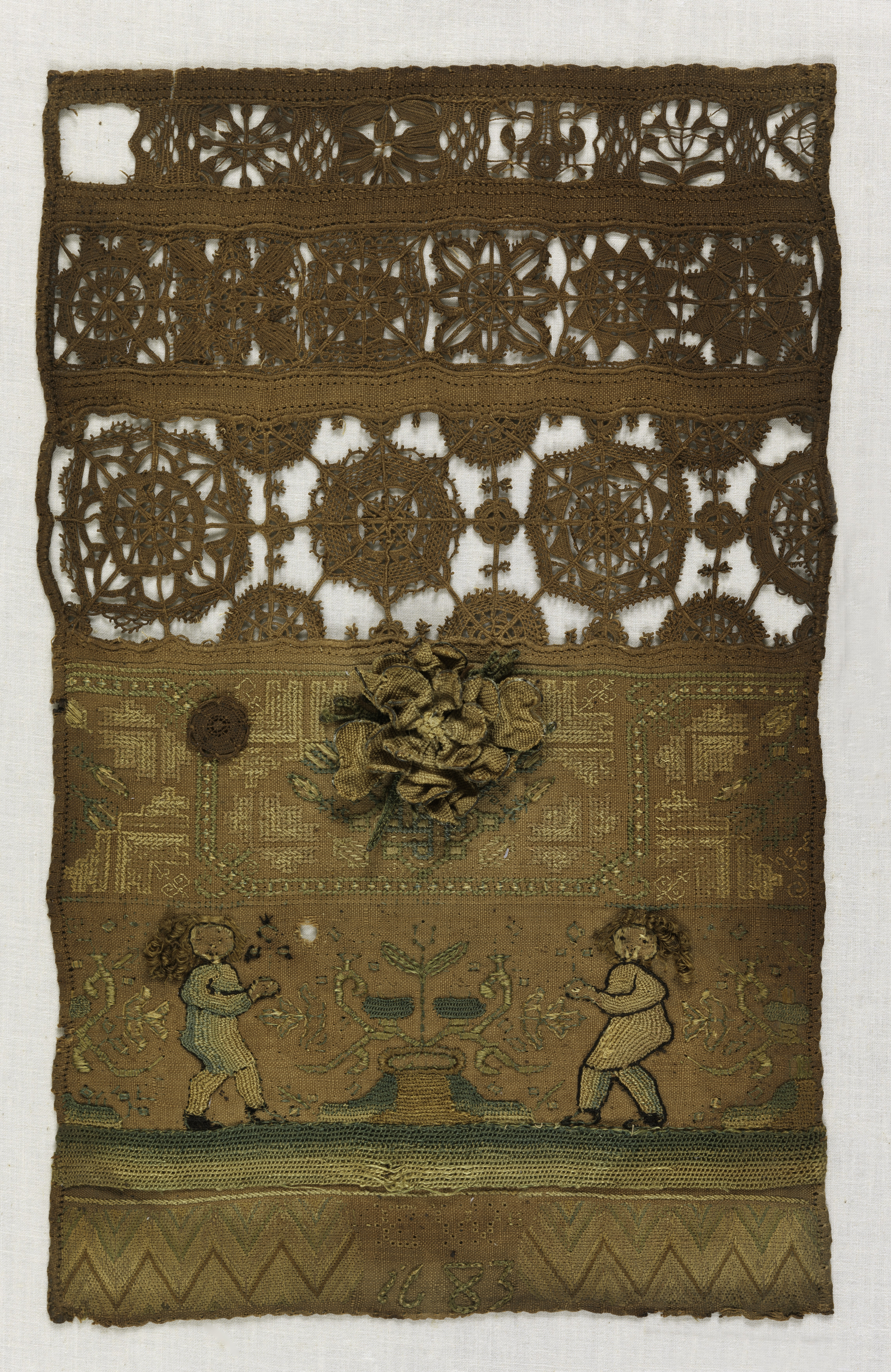
Sampler dated 1683

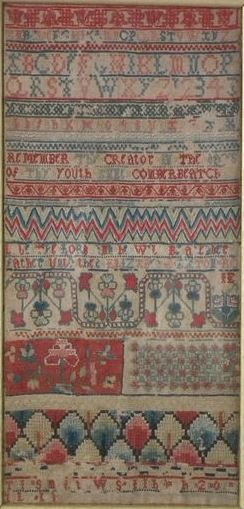
English band sampler by Elizabeth Axton dated 1712

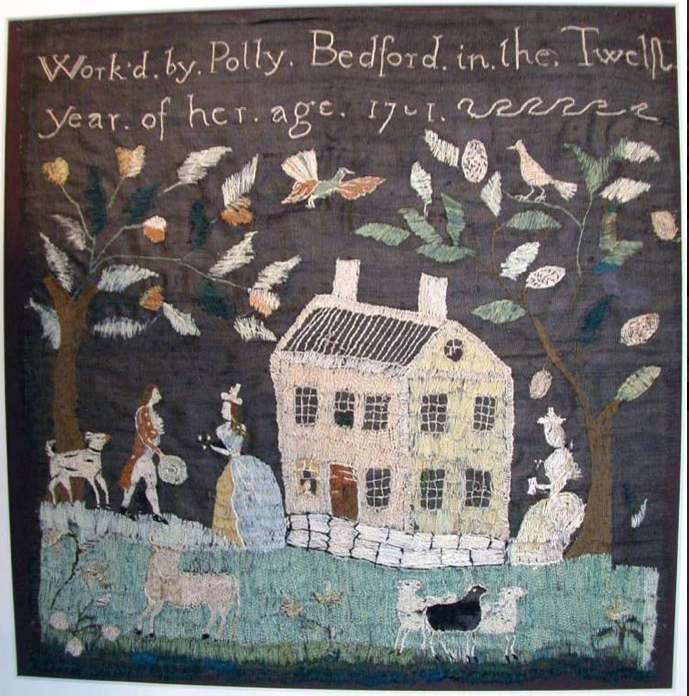
Sampler from Salem, Massachusetts, dated 1791

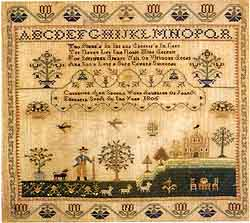
Sampler worked by Catharine Ann Speel in silk on linen, Philadelphia, dated 1805

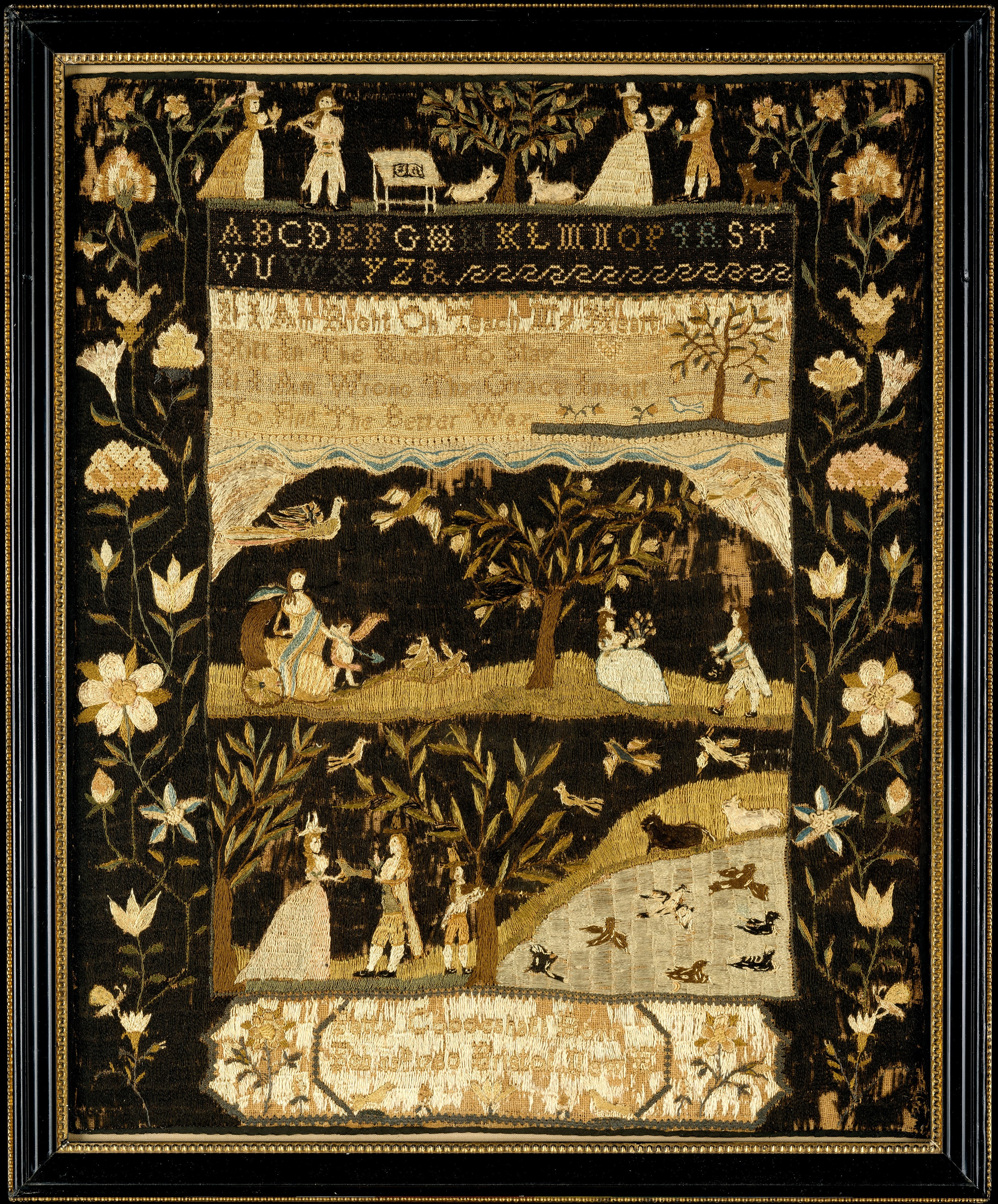
Sampler made by 12-year-old Patty Coggeshall of Rhode Island, dated 1792
Ella Josephine Sterling, Sampler, c. 1936, NGA 12222

== Modern samplers ==
Samplers are widely stitched today. Designs range widely in style, from accurate reproductions of historic pieces to much more contemporary and modern styles. Popular topics include designs commemorating births and marriages, family trees, and maps.

The word "sampler" has been applied to different styles of needlework meant for display. However, the genre may broadly be said to include any needlework that serves as a personal reference for patterns, stitches, or designs to include in other pieces.

Materials used include aida cloth, evenweave, and linen fabrics, in cotton, linen, and man-made materials combined in more and more ways; and fibers from cotton floss to silk, rayon, viscose, and metallic.

== See also ==
- Cross stitch
