= Whitework embroidery =

Creative works made with a needle using white thread on a white ground

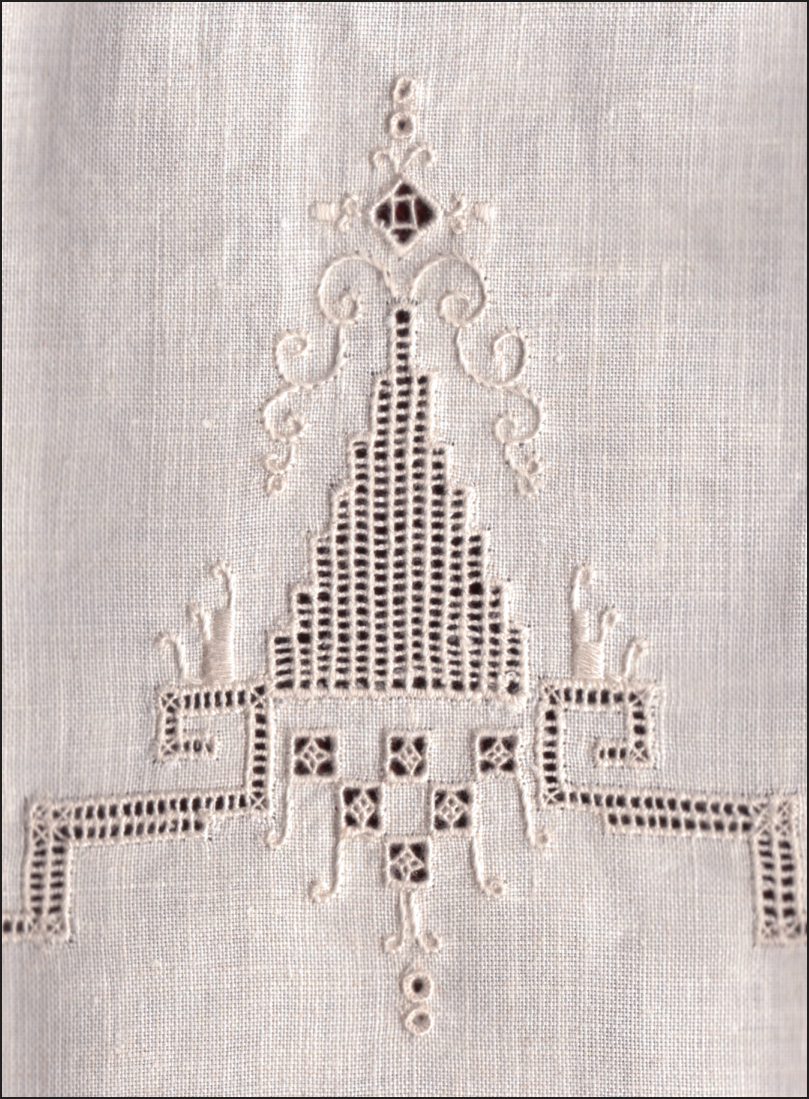
Linen towel with drawn threadwork accented with embroidery in stem and satin stitch.

Whitework embroidery is any embroidery technique in which the stitch and the foundation fabric (traditionally white linen) are of same color. Styles of whitework embroidery include most drawn thread work, broderie anglaise, Hardanger embroidery, Hedebo embroidery, Mountmellick embroidery, reticella and Schwalm. Whitework embroidery is one of the techniques employed in heirloom sewing for blouses, christening gowns, baby bonnets, and other small articles. It has been used extensively on household and ecclesiastical linen, as decoration. It is often found on traditional regional and national costume, particularly on shirts, aprons and head coverings.

== Description of the technique ==
The term whitework encompasses a wide variety of specific forms of embroidery and can refer to freestyle, counted thread, and canvas-work techniques. Some whitework is known as openwork. Openwork includes drawn thread work and the related cutwork, in which threads are removed (drawn) from the background fabric, which produces an open, lacy effect. Examples of drawn thread work are broderie anglaise, Madeira, and Hardanger.

A range of different cloths have historically been used for whitework, generally lightweight cottons, but also linen or silk. Very small pin-tuck pleats, cutwork, satin stitch, and floral forms are typical features of whitework embroidery, which, de la Haye describes as “simultaneously decorative and plain”, particularly as the threads used in this technique match the colour of the cloth used.

== History ==
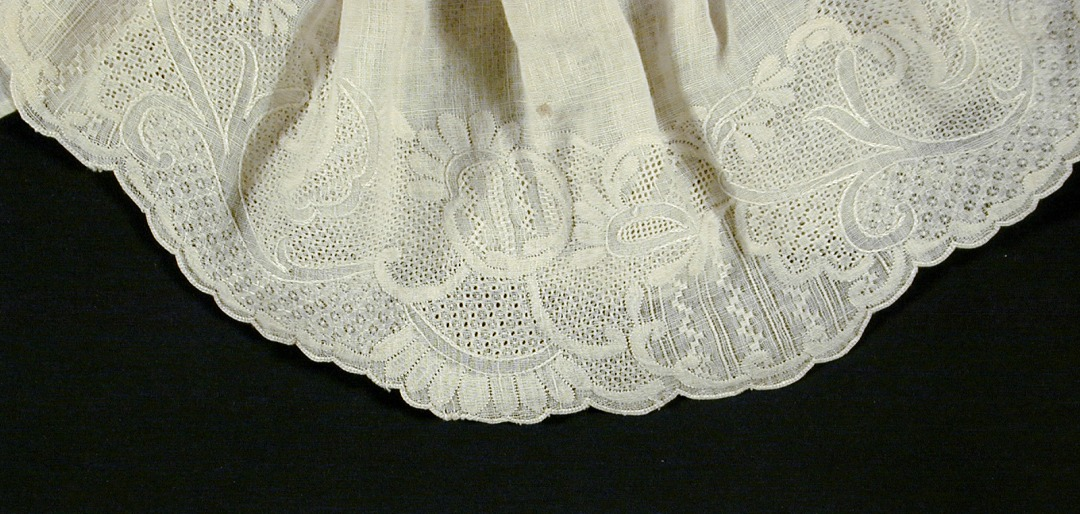
Dresden work on white linen; Engageantes

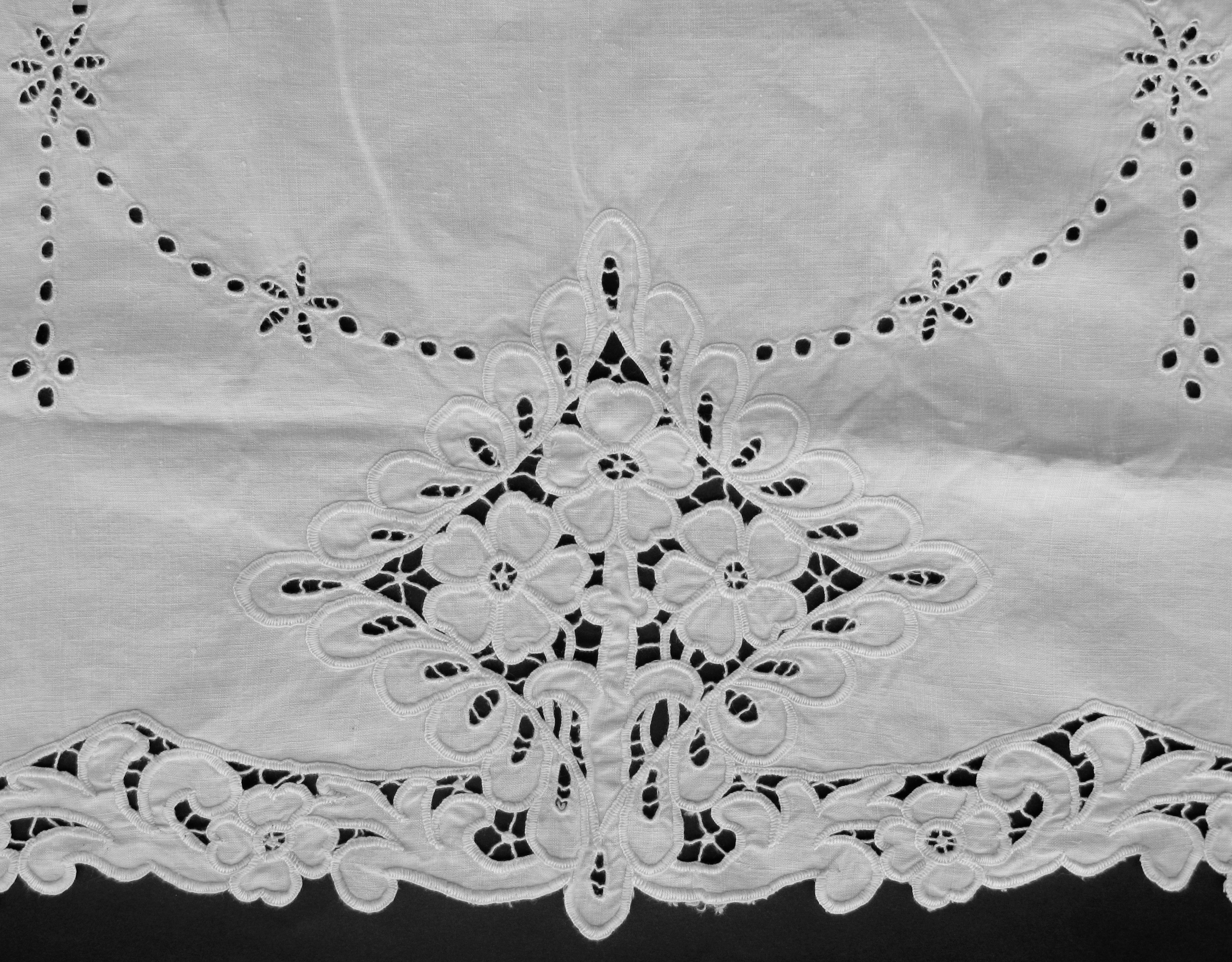
Richelieu cutwork embroidery, a form of whitework

Different styles of whitework emanated from different areas and at a variety of times in history. There are examples of pulled thread work from the 1200s. Prior to the 1500s, embroidered clothing and other textiles were limited to the church and to royalty. Dresden work, a pulled thread style, developed in Germany. In the early 1700s, it was popular as a substitute for lace. The term "Dresden lace" was used by Terèse de Dillmont, other terms for it include "Point de Saxe", or "Point de Dresde" to refer to Dresden white embroidery. Broderie anglaise, which features eyelets, was particularly popular in the late 1800s. When the 9th-century tomb of St. Cuthbert was opened in the 12th century, an example of drawn thread work was found in it. Another form of whitework, cutwork, was found throughout Europe, but highly skilled cutwork originated in Italy. In the 1500s, Cardinal Richelieu introduced it to France. It was so popular in the 1500s and 1600s in England that, by law, only the noble classes could wear it.

Whitework continued to be used as a technique, and became more widely accessible and adopted across the socioeconomic spectrum, particularly during the 19th century.

In the late 18th century, whitework embroidery featured on garments of the fashionable elite and middle classes. Gowns made of lightweight muslins, as well as petticoats and aprons were adorned with the decorative embroidery technique, which was described in Saint-Aubin's 1770 work 'L'Art du Brodeur', as ‘small stitches one bastes the muslin over the design which has been drawn on paper or parchment.'. When produced during the 18th century, the design was therefore not applied directly to the fabric, instead being visible to the embroiderer through the sheer fabric which was being used. Sheer fabric examples can be found in museums, such as this brusttuch or a shawl.

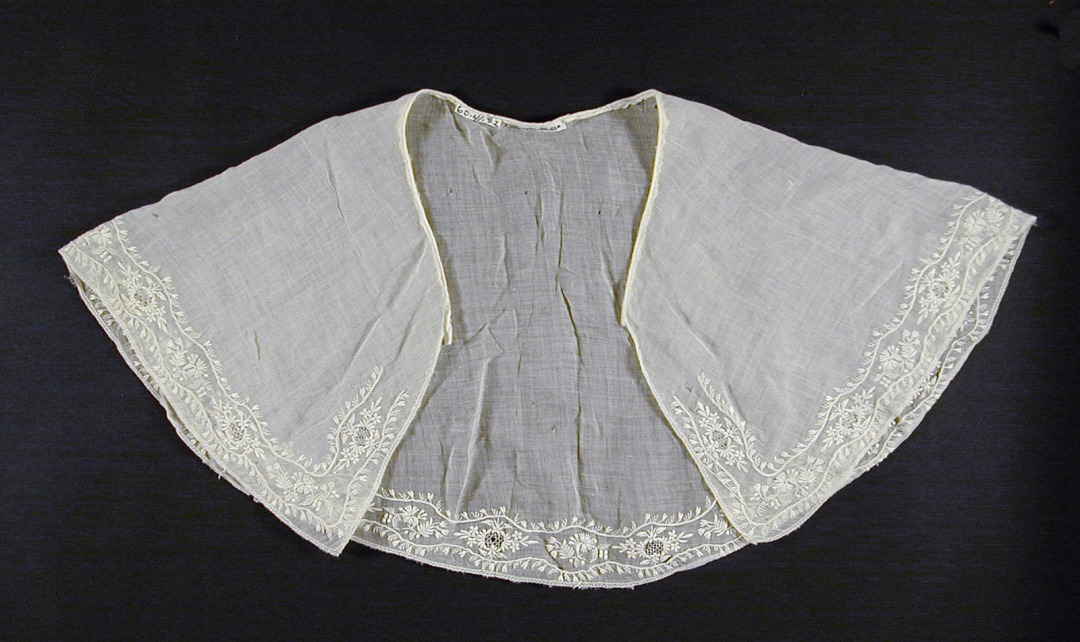
Women's collar, Linen plain weave, drawn threadwork, cotton embroidery. Europe or North America, c. early 19th century. Los Angeles County Museum of Art: 60.41.82.

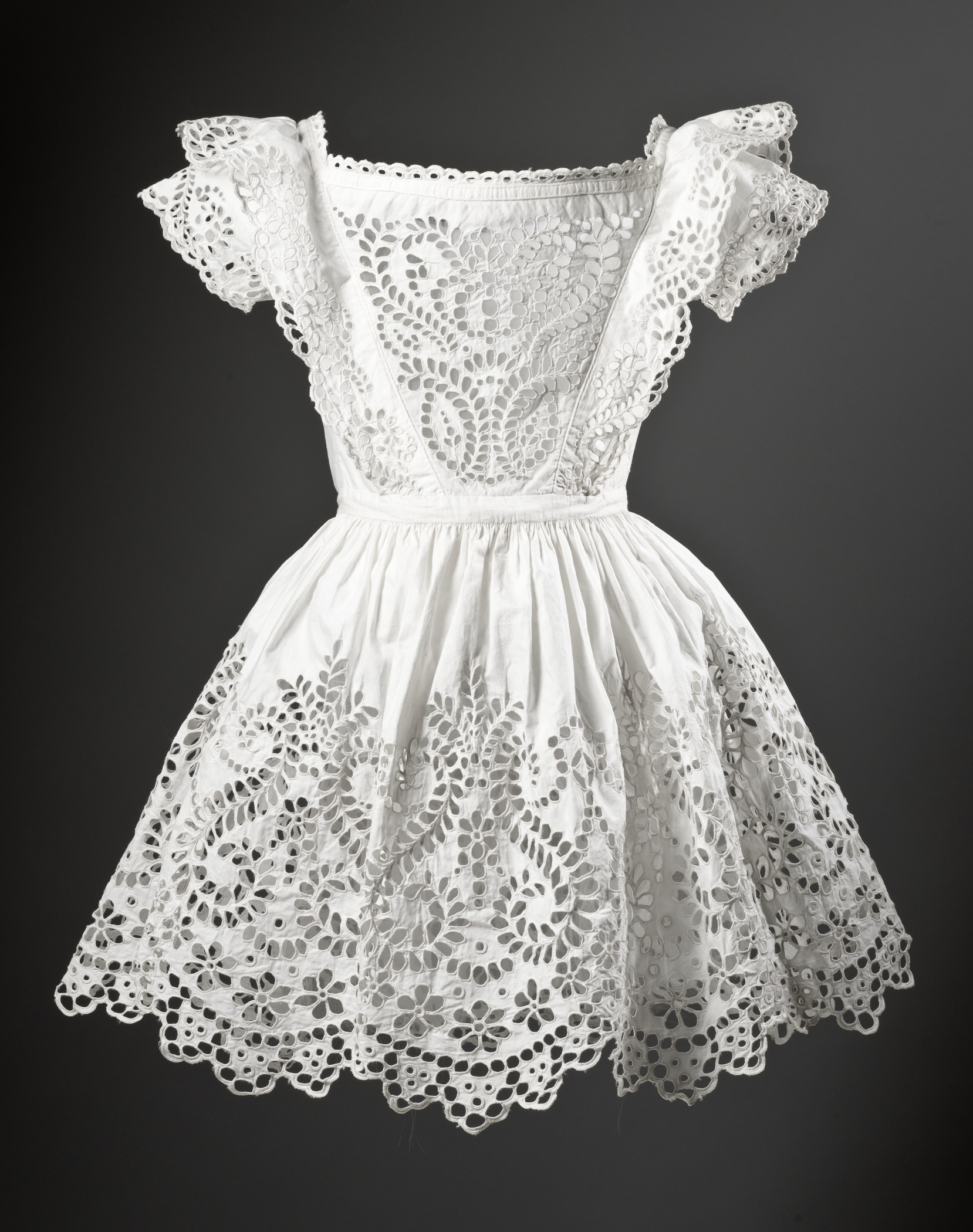
Boy's Frock, cotton with white-cutwork embroidery (broderie anglaise), probably England, c.1855. Los Angeles County Museum of Art: M.2007.211.89.

During the 19th century, the rise in whitework embroidery as a fashion item coincided with the popularity of lace. As whitework was produced at a lower cost to lace at this time, it was more accessible to a wider proportion of the population. Though employing entirely hand-made techniques, the manufacture of pieces decorated with whitework embroidery took on an industrial scale, due to consumer demand.

Through its time in fashion in the 19th century whitework embroidery could be found on garments, accessories, and home textiles, including decorative collars, cuffs, chemises, and pelerines for womenswear, as well as bonnets and dresses for infants.

After the eventual demise from a huge mass-producing industry at the end of the 19th century, whitework embroidery made several re-appearances in fashion. Light fabrics and colours popularised in fashions of the 1910s saw the re-emergence of whitework embroidery on outerwear such as ‘lingerie dresses’ (so called due to the fabrics used in their construction), and Edwardian garments were referenced in Mary Quant's 1960s Victorian-inspired collections.

The traditional skills and new design works are practiced by contemporary masters. Contemporary designers working with whitework include Jenny Adin-Christie, Yvette Stanton, Tracy A Franklin Ayako Otsuka and Trish Burr.

=== Regional embroidery ===
Many traditional forms of whitework are found in towns and regions, having developed as specific styles over a period of time. They are often found on the traditional costume of the region, on shirts, aprons or head coverings. They can also be found on household linens and ecclesiastical or ritual cloths. Examples of such embroideries are:

- Hardanger embroidery (Hardangersøm) - from the Hardanger region of Norway.
- Schwalm embroidery (Schwälmer Weißstickerei or Hessenstickerei) - from the Schwalm region of Hesse province, Germany.
- Ayrshire work - from Ayrshire, Scotland.
- Dresden work (Point de Saxe) - from Dresden, Germany.
- Hedebo - from the Hedebo region of Zealand, Denmark.
- Lefkara lace (Lefkaritiko) - from Lefkara, Cyprus.
- Mountmellick embroidery - from Mountmellick, Ireland.
- Guimarães embroidery (Bordado de Guimarães) - Guimarães, Portugal.
- Frisian whitework (Fries witwerk) - from Friesland, the Netherlands.
- Marken embroidery - from Marken, the Netherlands.
- Näversöm - from the Halsingland region of Sweden.
- Silesian embroidery - Silesia (Śląsk) in the south of Poland, bordering Czechia.
- Sardinian knotted embroidery (punt 'e nù) - from Teulada, Sardinia.
- Appenzell embroidery (Appenzeller Handstickerei) - from Appenzell, Switzerland.

=== The whitework industry in Scotland ===
The technique became associated with Ayrshire, Scotland, during the 19th century. As a centre of production, this form of embroidery is therefore often referred to as Ayrshire Whitework. Whitework textiles were however produced for the garment trade throughout the west of Scotland at this time, including in Paisley and the wider county of Renfrewshire.

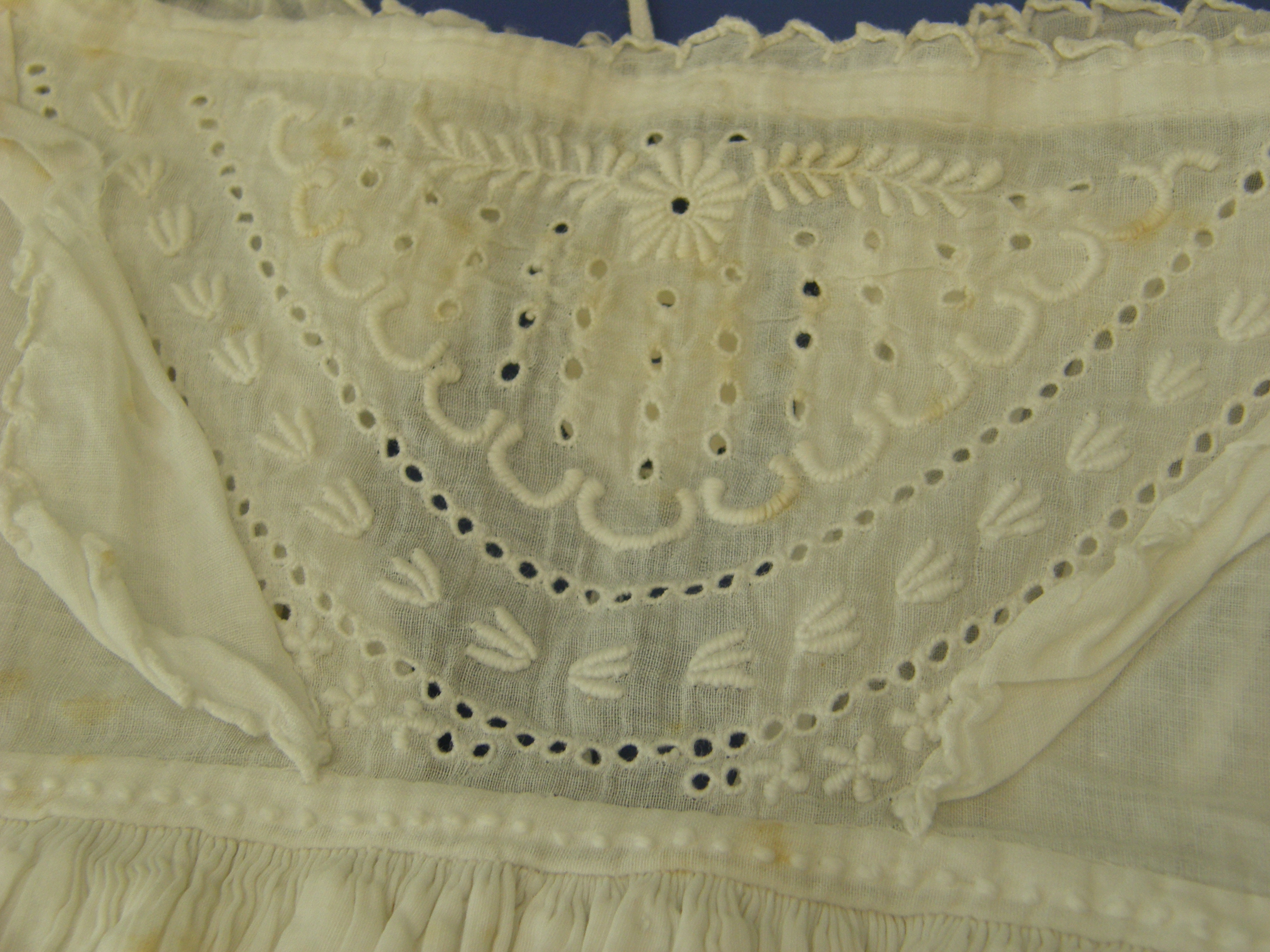
Detail of whitework embroidery applied to infant's Christening gown, cotton, c.1850. Auckland Museum, Tamaki Paenga Hira: 1983.35, T941.

The processing and manufacture of cotton thread and woven cloth in the west of Scotland, amongst several other different fibres and fabrics, can be traced to the late 18th century, with numerous subsidiary trades including bleaching, dying, and printing also being established in this area. An interconnected system of industry and trade soon developed, and the rise in popularity for such embroidery as whitework was well situated to this geographic area, which had previously also been connected with the production of tambour embroidery, had good transport links, and established industry and trade networks.

Thousands of women were employed as outworkers in the industry in the west of Scotland, producing items deemed “small luxuries” which were traded through the Glasgow embroidered muslin markets.

Indian chikan embroidery holds similarities with the Ayrshire style of embroidery, particularly in that the two regions' embroidery often featured on very lightweight muslin cloths.

== Bibliography ==
- S.F.A. Caulfield and B.C. Saward, The Dictionary of Needlework, 1885.
- Virginia Churchill Bath, Needlework in America, Viking Press, 1979 ISBN 0-670-50575-7
- McNeill, Moyra, Pulled Thread Embroidery, 2009. Dover Publications. ISBN 978-0-486-27857-5
- Bleckwenn, Ruth; Jenzen, Igor A.; Kunstgewerbemuseum Dresden, eds. (2000). Dresdner Spitzen - Point de Saxe: virtuose Weißstickereien des 18. Jahrhunderts; [Bestandskatalog und Begleitbuch zur Ausstellung im Kunstgewerbemuseum Dresden vom 15. Juli bis 31. Oktober 2000]. Dresden: Kunstgewerbemuseum. ISBN 978-3-932264-20-7
- Toomer, Heather; Reed, Elspeth (2008). Embroidered with white: the 18th century fashion for Dresden lace and other whiteworked accessories. England: Heather Toomer Antique Lace. ISBN 978-0-9542730-2-6
- Fangel, Esther; Winckler, Ida; Wuldem Madsen, Agnete, eds. (1977). Danish Pulled Thread Embroidery: Sammentrækssyning. New York: Dover Publ. ISBN 978-0-486-23474-8
- Ambuter, Carolyn (1982). The Open Canvas. Workman Pub Co. ISBN 978-0-89480-171-6
