= Mountmellick embroidery =

Floral whitework embroidery originating in Ireland

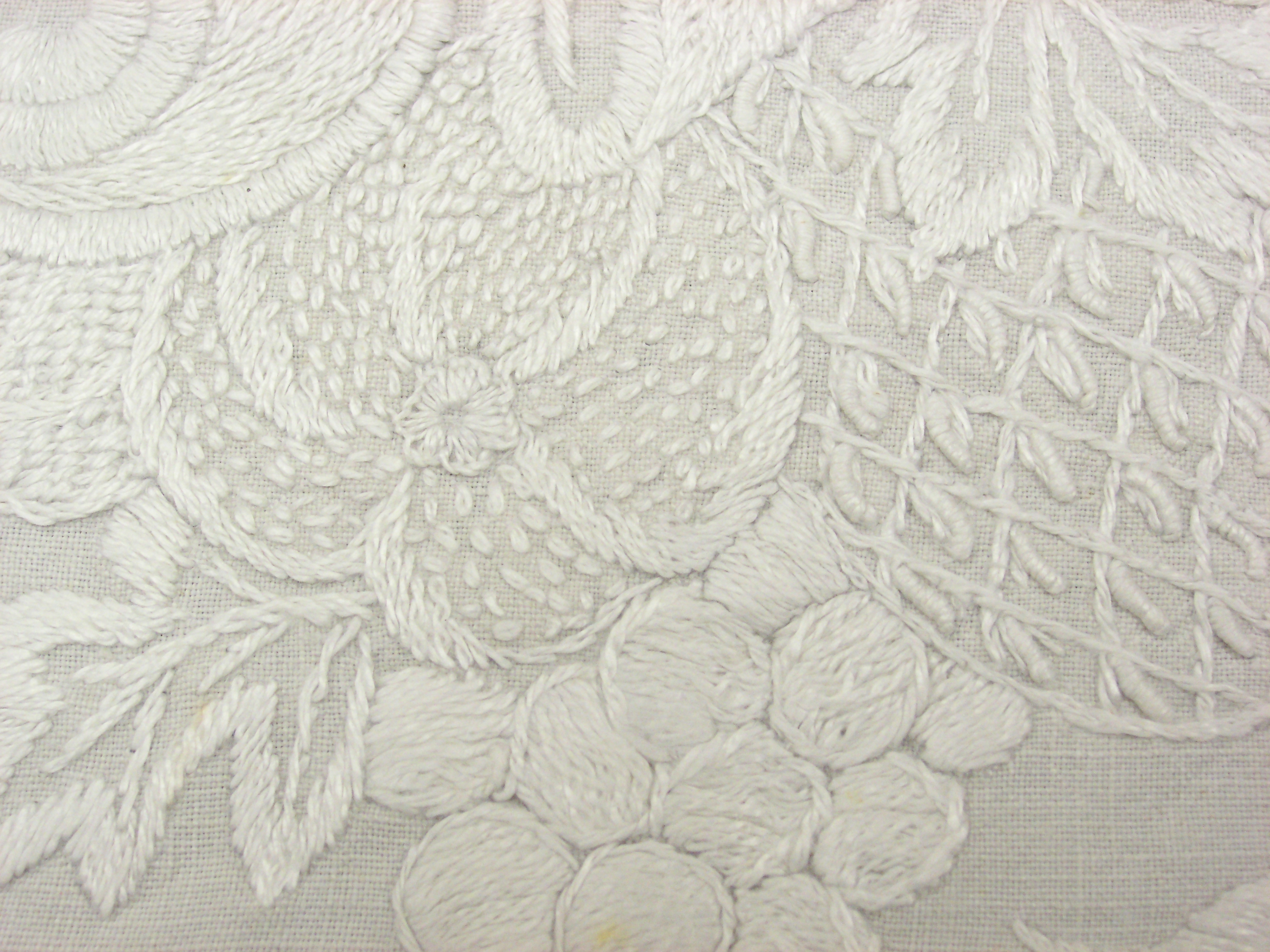
Detail from a runner in the collections of Auckland Museum showing Mountmellick work

Mountmellick embroidery or Mountmellick work is a floral whitework embroidery originating in the town of Mountmellick in County Laois, Ireland, in the early nineteenth century.

== History ==
It was developed around 1825 by Johanna Carter, who taught it to a group of about 15 women and girls. It used white cotton thread on white cotton fabric, and predominantly floral motifs. The plants featured were those that were found around the town of Mountmellick, and included blackberries, oak, fern, dog roses and shamrocks.

The Great Irish Famine (1845–1849) hit the town of Mountmellick very hard. In about 1880, Mrs Millner, a member of the Religious Society of Friends (who were a strong part of the Mountmellick community) started an industrial association to help people within the town. She employed women to stitch Mountmellick embroidery for sale. Many of these items were sold from the port of Cobh, from where many people embarked on journeys to America.

In the 1970s, Sister Teresa Margaret McCarthy of the Presentation Convent in Mountmellick learned of the embroidery, and collected together examples from around the area in order to study and learn from them. She taught herself the stitches and then began teaching others. Yvette Stanton has recreated the original knitted fringe used in historical pieces of Mountmellick embroidery.

As of 2022, the chairperson of the Mountmellick embroidery museum is Ann Dowling.

== Technique and uses ==
Mountmellick embroidery uses predominantly knotted and padded stitches to create beautifully textured whitework embroidery. The work features a characteristic knitted fringe. Other forms of lace, such as crochet or bobbin lace are not authentic trims for Mountmellick work.

The embroidery was usually employed on items of household use such as doilies, nightdress cases, brush and comb bags, bedspreads/coverlets, and tablecloths. Though the work was white and hence inclined to show stains, it was so sturdy that it could be easily boiled white again.

Today, Mountmellick embroidery is enjoying a resurgence of popularity around the world. A museum at the Mountmellick Development Association in Mountmellick has been opened to permanently display articles of Mountmellick embroidery for all to see. The National Museum of Ireland (Dublin) also has some beautiful examples of the work, as does the Ulster Folk and Transport Museum outside Belfast and the An Grianan Adult Education College at Termonfechin, County Louth.
