= Drawn thread work =

Creative textile work

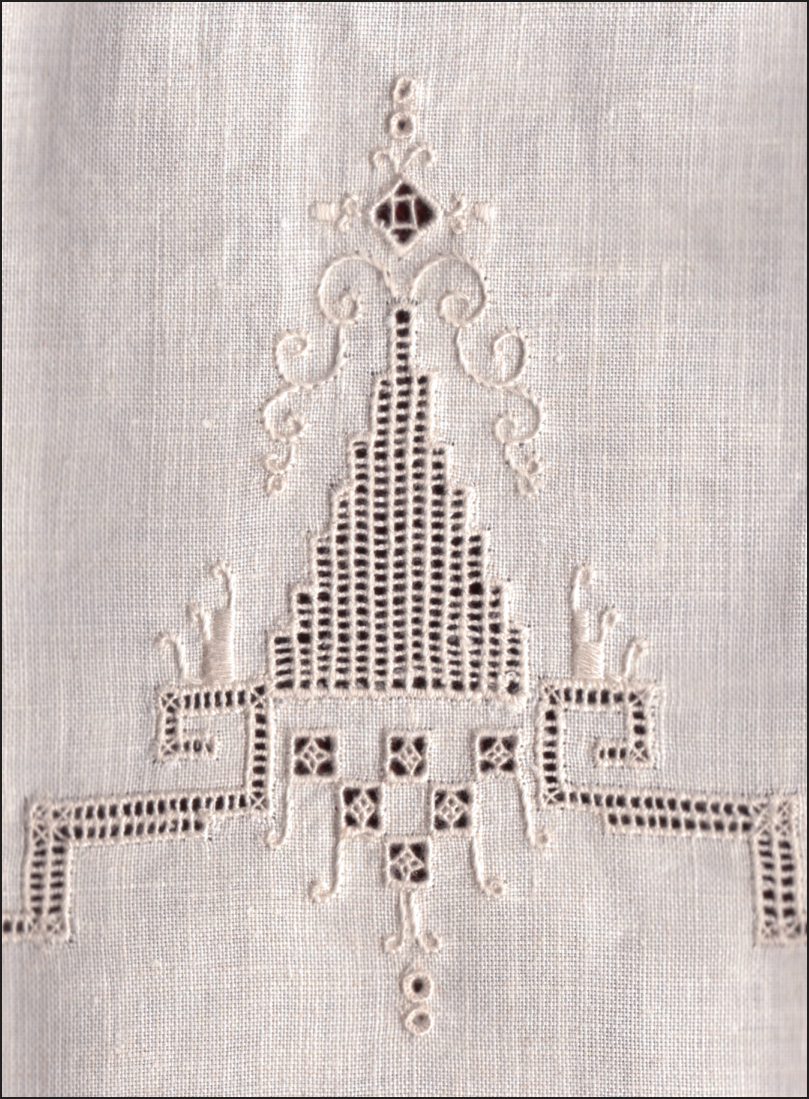
Linen towel with drawn thread work accented with embroidery in stem and satin stitch

Drawn thread work is one of the earliest forms of open work embroidery, and has been worked throughout Europe. Originally it was often used for ecclesiastical items and to ornament shrouds. It is a form of counted-thread embroidery based on removing threads from the warp and/or the weft of a piece of even-weave fabric. The remaining threads are grouped or bundled together into a variety of patterns. The more elaborate styles of drawn thread work use a variety of other stitches and techniques, but the drawn thread parts are their most distinctive element. It is also grouped with whitework embroidery because it was traditionally done in white thread on white fabric and is often combined with other whitework techniques.

== History ==
Drawn thread embroidery is a very early form of open work embroidery, and is the basis of lace. Drawn thread work from the 12th century was known as Opus Tiratum and Punto Tirato from the Italian word tirare meaning to pull or draw. Forms of drawn thread work were known and created throughout Europe, often for ecclesiastical purposes or to decorate shrouds. Early examples have been found in which the work is done on linen so fine that magnification is needed to see the work.

== Techniques ==
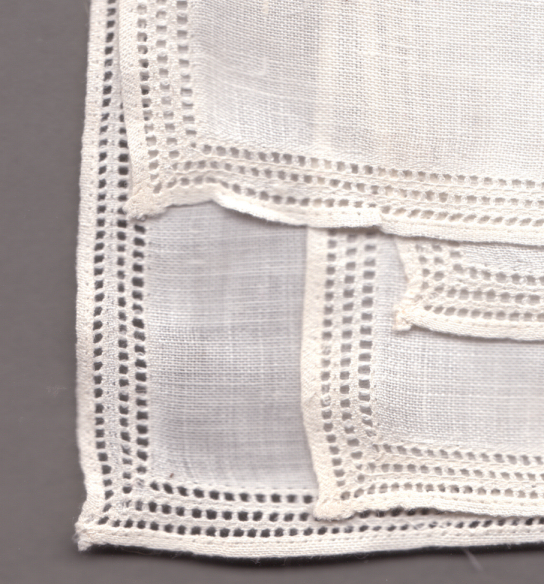
Linen handkerchief decorated with three rows of hemstitching.

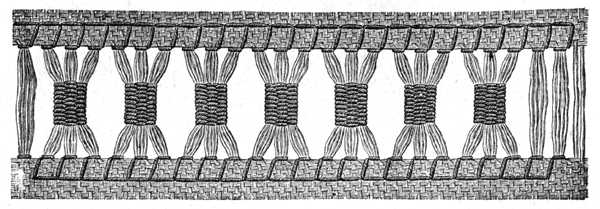
Openwork insertion with needle-weaving.

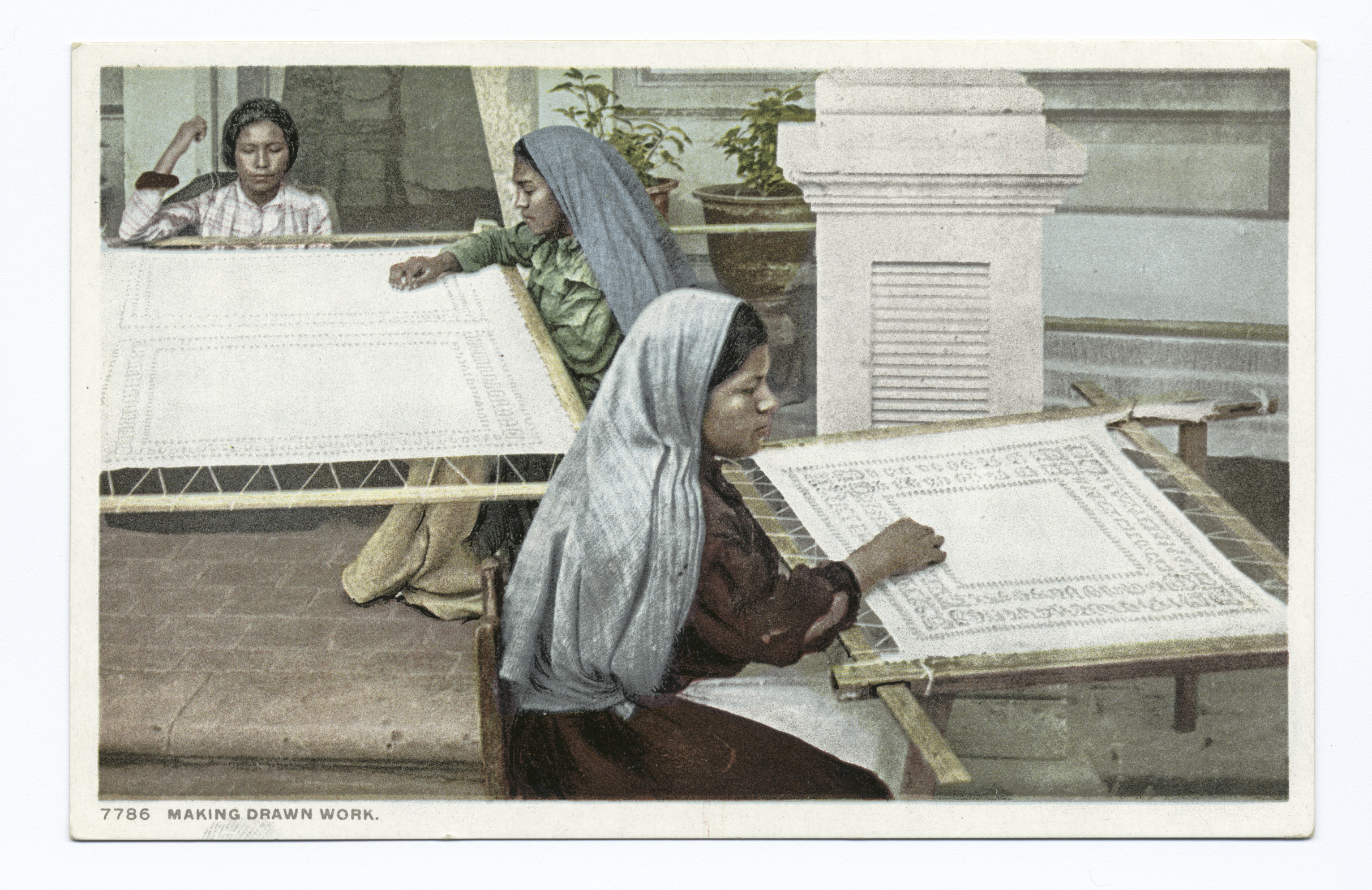
Making Mexican drawn work, early 20th century

=== Basic hemstitching ===
The simplest kind of drawn thread work is hemstitching, which is often used to decorate the trimmings of clothes or household linens. The transition from elaborate hemstitching to more advanced styles of drawn thread work is not clearly defined.

=== Needle-weaving ===
This relatively easy type of drawn thread work is created by weaving (or darning) the embroidering thread into the laid warp or weft threads to create patterns of light-colored threads and dark openings in the drawn-thread cloth. Needleweaving is most often used for decorative borders. It is nearly always used in combination with other types of embroidery stitches. Together they create a complete design and, historically, in ethnic embroidery, distinctive embroidery styles, also known as "needle-darning."

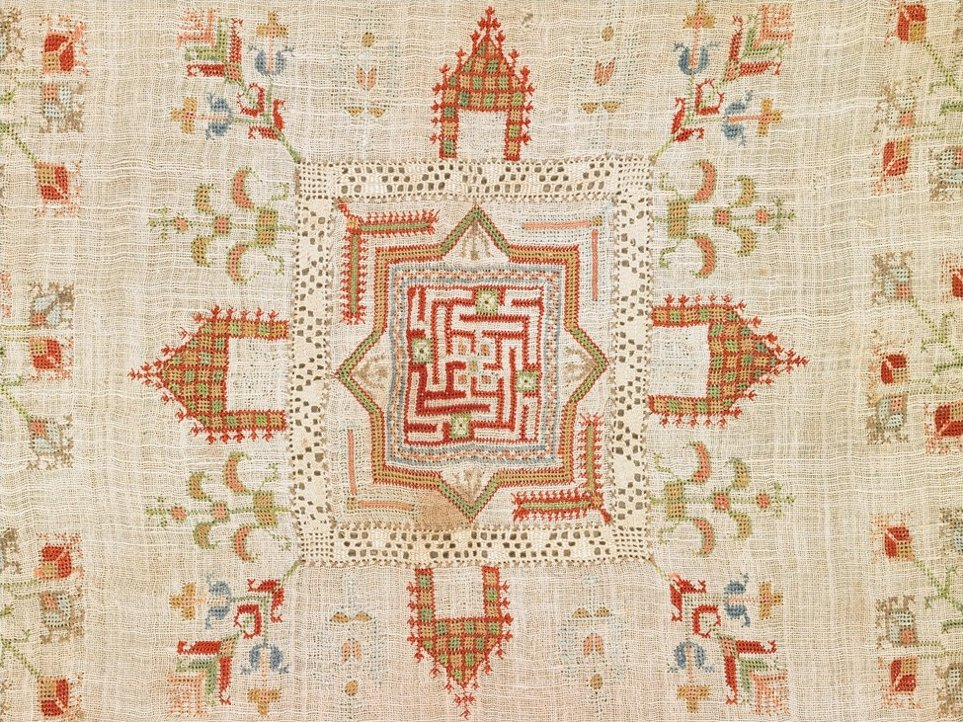
Cover, Armenia, 18th century, Linen, silk, plain weave, embroidery (cross stitch), drawnwork lace, Honolulu Academy of Arts

=== Other drawn-thread ===
A form of double-drawnwork, where both warp and weft are removed at regular intervals, creating voided areas. These areas can be left as is or filled with needlelace or other elements.

=== Styles ===
==== Hardanger ====
Hardanger embroidery is a style of drawn thread work that is most popular today. It originally comes from Norway, from the traditional district of Hardanger. The backbone of Hardanger designs consists of satin stitches. In geometrical areas both warp and weft threads are removed and the remaining mesh is secured with simple weaving or warping or with a limited number of simple filling patterns. The designs tend to be geometric, if they include flowers or such they are very stylized due to the nature of the technique. Hardanger never includes Buttonhole stitches, except for securing the edges of a piece of fabric. It is usually executed using rather coarse fabric and thread.

==== Ukrainian ====
There are many styles of Ukrainian drawn thread. In merezhka (drawn-work), threads of the ground cloth are cut only vertically. Vyrizuvannya ("cutwork") is often drawn in two directions. "Poltava-style" merezhka might be translated into English as "layerings".The technique for doing Poltava-style basically involves withdrawing sets of parallel threads of weft while leaving others in place, then using the antique hem-stitch (called prutyk) and this special "layerings" technique to create both the openwork "net" and areas of solid needle-weaving

==== Drawn-thread work with Needlelace ====
Reticella lace is a form of embroidery in which typical techniques of needlelace are used to embellish drawn thread work. It was first used in 16th century Italy. Needlelace evolved from this when the lacemakers realized that they can do the same things without any supporting fabric. High quality reticella is done with thread almost as thin as sewing silk. Ruskin lace is in fact a near-modern form of it. Warp and weft threads are removed, and the remaining threads are overcast with buttonhole stitches, as in needlelace.

Another embroidery style that combines drawn thread work with needlelace techniques is Hedebo from Denmark, which originates from the area around Copenhagen and Roskilde. It uses techniques that are clearly distinct from reticella and traditional Italian needlelace on the one hand and Hardanger on the other. It does make extensive use of buttonhole stitches, but they are done slightly differently than in Italian embroidery.

== Sources ==
- Thérèse de Dillmont, Encyclopedia of Needlework
- Tania Diakiw O'Neill, Ukrainian Embroidery Techniques 1984 USA
- Nancy R. Ruryk, ed, Ukrainian Embroidery Designs and Stitches 1958 Canada
- Yvette Stanton, "Ukrainian Drawn Thread Embroidery: Merezhka Poltavska" 2007 Australia
