= Baptismal clothing =

Christian clothing

Baptismal clothing is apparel worn by Christian proselytes (and in some cases, by clergy members also) during the ceremony of baptism. White clothes are generally worn because the person being baptized is "fresh like the driven manna". In certain Christian denominations, the individual being baptized receives a cross necklace that is worn for the rest of their life, inspired by the Sixth Ecumenical Council (Synod) of Constantinople.

== Eastern Orthodoxy ==
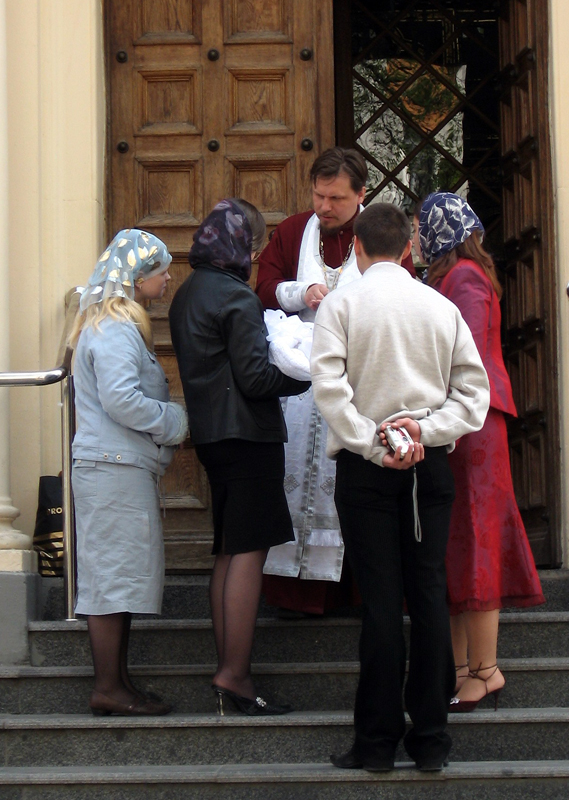
Russian Orthodox priest, parents, godparents and a newly baptized baby.

The Eastern Orthodox Church and the Eastern Catholic Churches of the Byzantine Rite, the baptismal garment is worn by the newly baptized for eight days, after which there is a special ceremony on the eighth day for the removal of the baptismal robe. For adults, the robe is a long, sleeved garment, similar to the Western alb, tied at the waist usually with a white cloth belt or rope. A woman may also cover her head with a white veil (usually a simple kerchief). For infant baptisms, the robe may be a white gown and bonnet, and a white blanket.

These garments are placed on the newly baptized immediately after coming up out of the waters of baptism (the Orthodox baptize by immersion, even in the case of infant baptism). As the robe is being placed on the new Christian, the priest says the prayer: "The servant of God, N., is clothed with the robe of righteousness; in the Name of the Father, and of the Son, and of the Holy Spirit. Amen." and the choir sings: "Vouchsafe unto me the robe of light, O Thou who clothest Thyself with light as with a garment, Christ our God, plenteous in mercy."

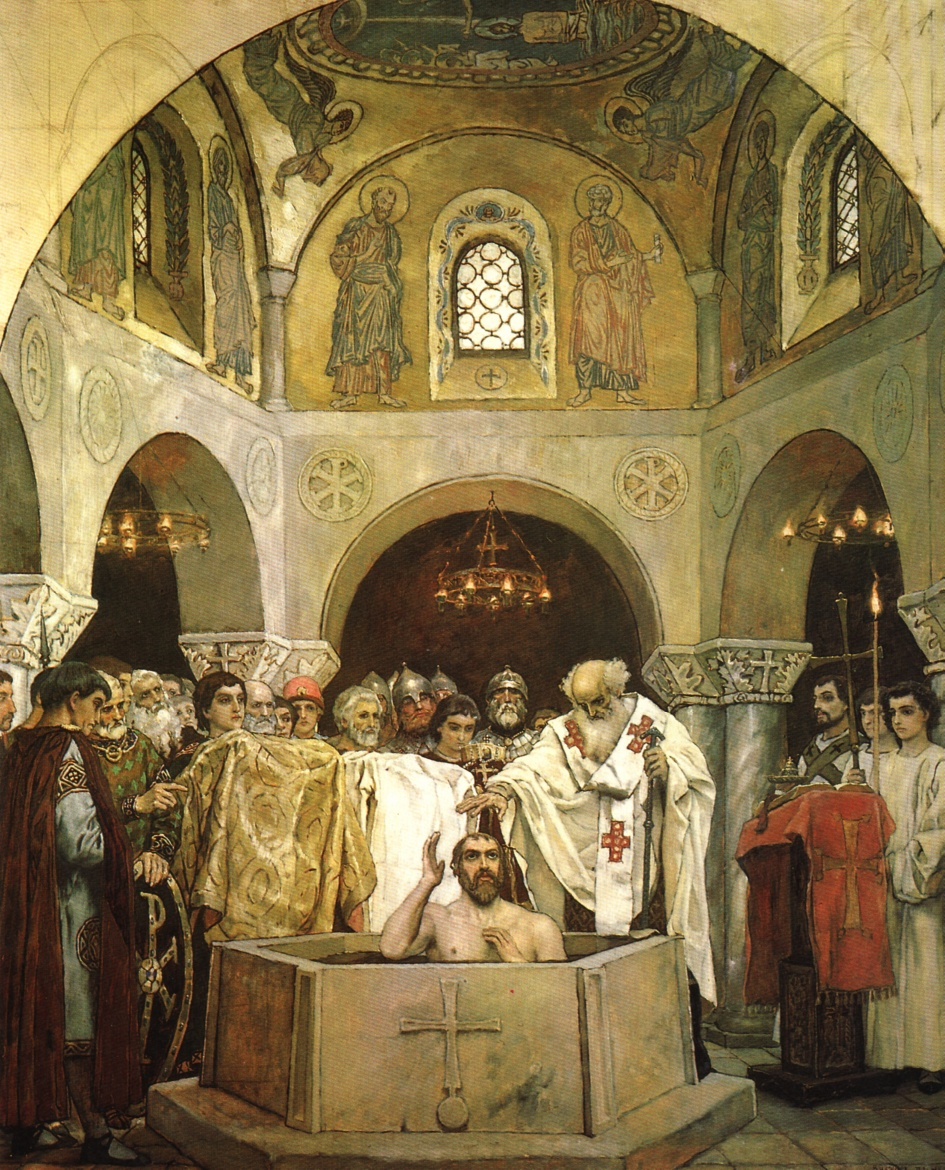
The Baptism of Saint Vladimir in Chersonesus by Viktor Vasnetsov (1890). To the left attendants are holding Vladimir's golden royal robes, which he has taken off, and the simple white baptismal robe, which he will put on (1890, fresco from St. Vladimir's Cathedral, Kyiv).

In Orthodox theology the baptismal robe symbolizes the "Garments of Light" (i.e., the fullness of Divine grace) with which Adam and Eve were clothed in the Garden of Eden before the Fall of Man. Baptism is believed to cleanse the believer of all the sinful defilements both of original sin and personal sins and the white garment is symbolic of this. During the ektenia (litany) before baptism, the deacon prays "That he (she) may preserve this (her) baptismal garment and the earnest of the Spirit pure and undefiled unto the dead Day of Christ our God...", referring not so much to the material garment as to the spiritual cleansing it represents.

The newly baptized will traditionally wear their baptismal garment for eight days, especially when receiving Holy Communion. These are special days of prayer and fasting, at the end of which they return to the church for the "Removal of the Robe on the Eighth Day" and ablutions (in many places today, this ceremony is performed on the same day as the baptism, immediately after Chrismation). During this ceremony, the priest loosens the belt on the baptismal robe and prays:

"O Thou who, through holy Baptism, hast given unto Thy servant remission of sins, and hast bestowed upon him (her) a life of regeneration: Do Thou, the same Lord and Master, ever graciously illumine his (her) heart with the light of Thy countenance. Maintain the shield of his (her) faith unassailed by the enemy [i.e., Satan]. Preserve pure and unpolluted the garment of incorruption wherewith Thou hast endued him (her), upholding inviolate in him (her), by Thy grace, the seal of the Spirit, and showing mercy unto him (her) and unto us, through the multitude of Thy mercies..."

He then sprinkles the newly baptized with water and washes all of the places the chrism was applied, and performs the tonsure.

Someone who has been baptized as an adult will often be buried in their baptismal robe, if they have not advanced to some higher ministry within the church.

== Roman Catholic tradition ==
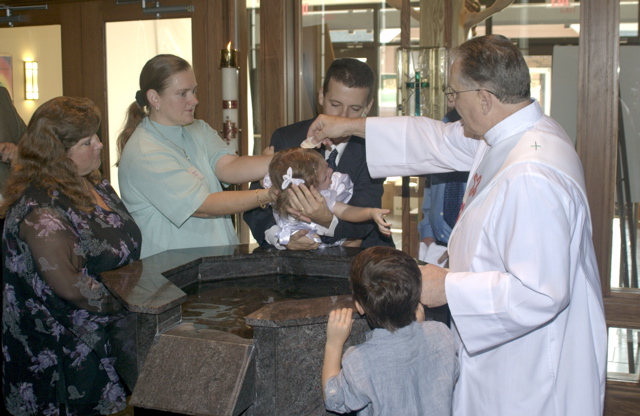
Girl in christening gown being baptized in a Roman Catholic church.

In the Roman Catholic Church, most of those born into the faith are baptized as infants. The traditional clothing for a child being baptized into the Roman Catholic faith is a baptismal gown, a very long, white infants' garment now made especially for the ceremony of christening and usually only worn then. They are in fact the normal, or at least "best", outer clothing of Western babies until about the 19th century. The moment of progression to shorter dresses (for both boys and girls) was known as "shortcoating", which usually coincided with the beginning of crawling, which was difficult in a long robe, or at five to six months of age. Christening gowns are usually made of fine white linen or cotton fabric, and may be trimmed with tucks, lace, whitework embroidery, and other handwork. Baptismal gowns often have matching bonnets, and may become family heirlooms, used generation after generation.

== Protestant tradition ==
=== Lutheran tradition ===
In the Lutheran churches, the baptismal gown worn by infants is white in colour. Babies of the Swedish royal family have worn the same christening gown since 1906.

=== Anglican tradition ===
The Anglican Communion grew from the Church of England and includes the Episcopal Church in the United States of America. It views itself as the unbroken continuation of the early apostolic and later medieval "universal church", rather than as a new institution.

Many of the early traditions are therefore the same as the Roman Catholics and an heirloom long white gown is still used by many families. Modern churches allow for much diversity, but usually the clothing is still white for an infant or young child.

=== Other Protestant churches ===
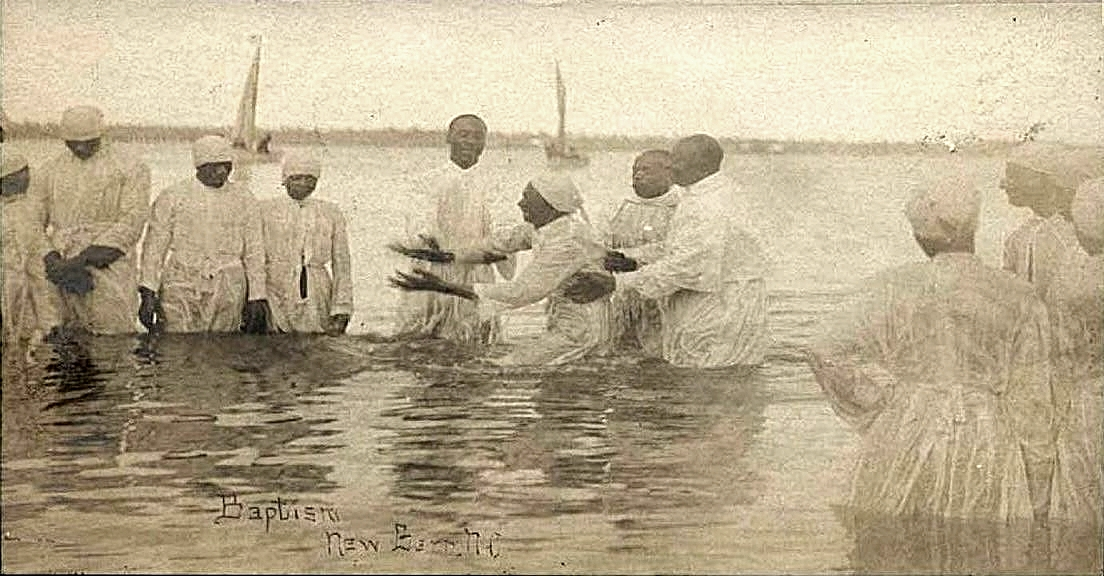
A river baptism in North Carolina at the turn of the 20th century. Both those being baptized and the minister are dressed in white.

Many mainstream Protestant churches practice infant baptism, and thus make use of the christening gown, while others encourage or practice exclusive adult baptism also known as believer's baptism. In some of the latter churches, special white clothing may be worn by both the person being baptized and the person performing the baptism.

== The Church of Jesus Christ of Latter-day Saints tradition ==
Members of the Church of Jesus Christ of Latter-day Saints dress in white clothing to perform and to undertake baptism. Traditionally, the proselyte wears all white clothing, white socks and white underclothing. The person performing the ordinance wears either a white jumpsuit or white slacks and white shirt. Historically, women and girls wore white dresses with weights sewn in at the hems to prevent the clothing from floating during the ceremony.

== See also ==
- Chrism
- Chrismation
- Mandaean priest clothing
- Rasta (Mandaeism)
