= Hemstitch =

Decorative drawn-thread stitch used to embellish hems and seams

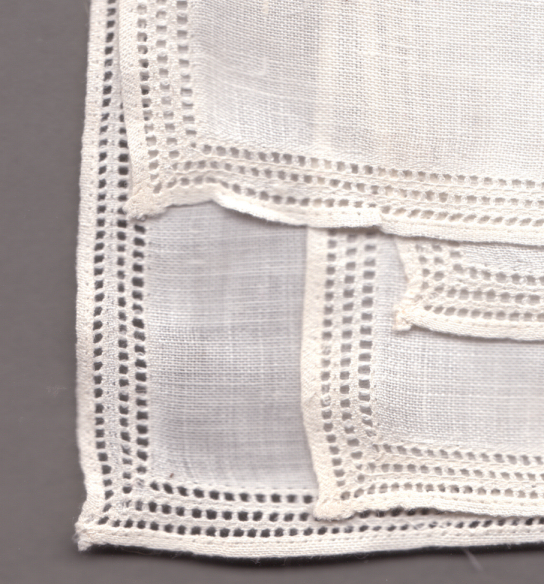
Hemstitched handkerchief.

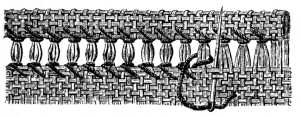
Ladder Hemstitch

Hemstitch or hem-stitch is a decorative drawn thread work or openwork hand-sewing technique for embellishing the hem of clothing or household linens. Unlike an ordinary hem, hemstitching can employ embroidery thread in a contrasting color so as to be noticeable.

In hemstitching, one or more threads are drawn out of the fabric parallel and next to the turned hem, and stitches bundle the remaining threads in a variety of decorative patterns while securing the hem in place. Multiple rows of drawn thread work may be used.

Hand hemstitching can be imitated by a hemstitching machine which has a piercer that pierces holes into the fabric and two separate needles that sew the hole open. There are also hemstitcher attachments for home sewing machines, and simple decorative stitches can be used over drawn threads to suggest hand-hemstitching.
