= Hedebo embroidery =

Danish white embroidery

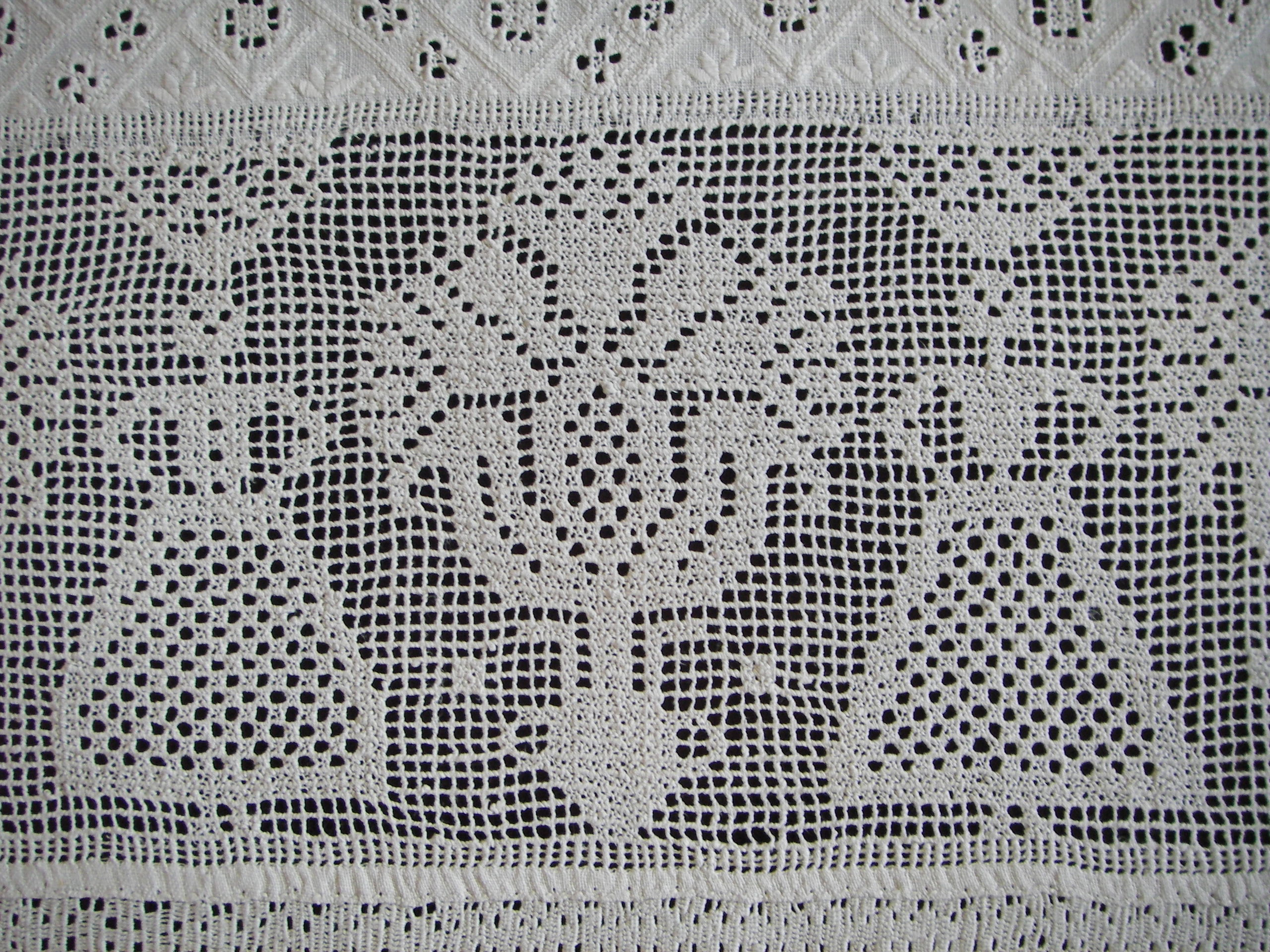
- Hedebo embroidery, dragværk or drawn thread work (1750–1840)
- Type: Embroidery
- Production method: Needle lace
- Production process: Handicraft
- Place of origin: Zealand, Denmark
- Introduced: 1760s

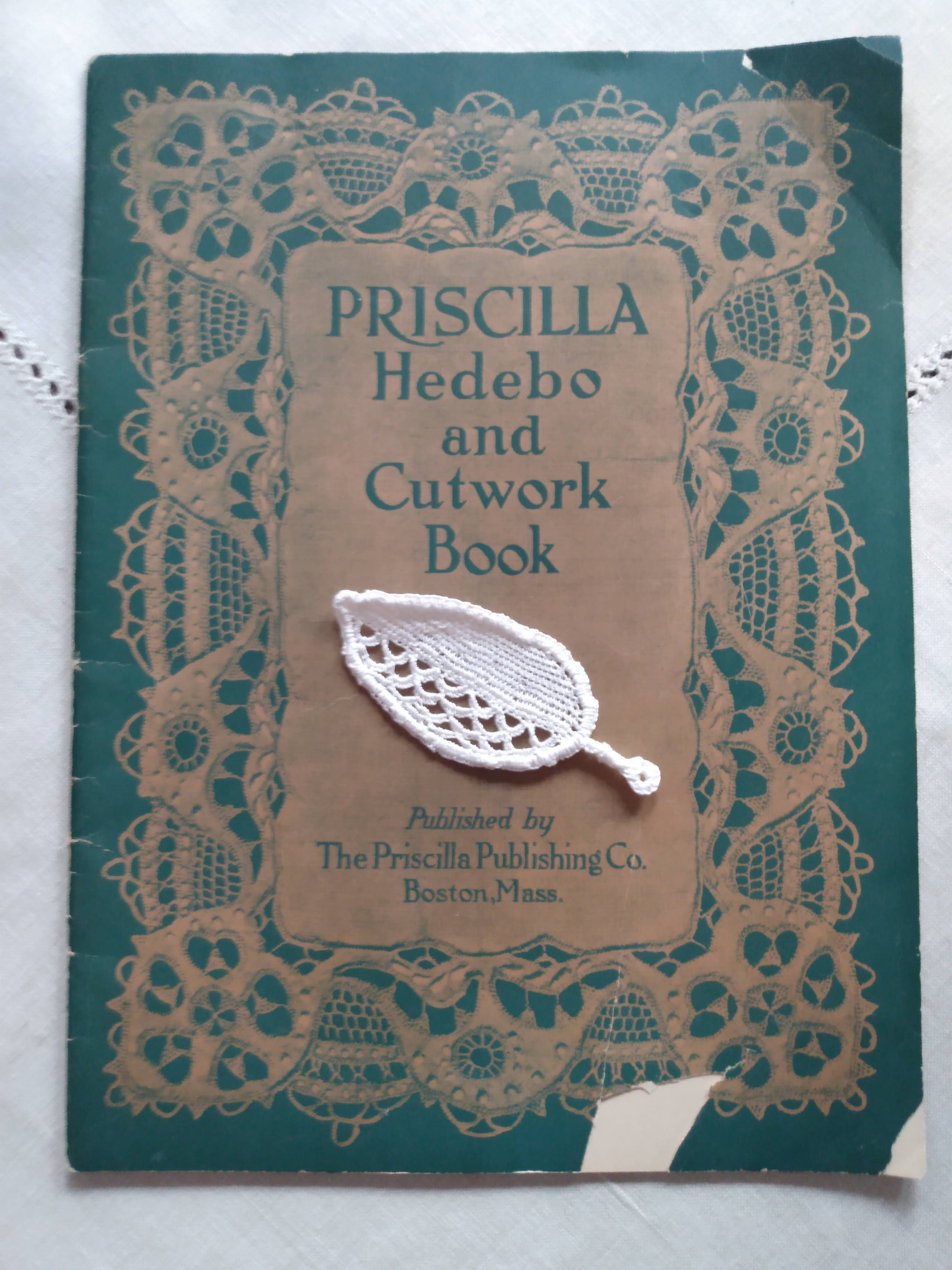
A paper pamphlet book by the publishers of Modern Priscilla Magazine with needle lace and cutwork instructions

The term Hedebo embroidery covers several forms of white embroidery which originated in the Hedebo (heathland) region of Zealand, Denmark, in the 1760s. The varied techniques which evolved over the next hundred years in the farming community were subsequently developed by the middle classes until around 1820. They were applied to articles of clothing such as collars and cuffs but were also used to decorate bed linen.

== Introduction ==
Related to reticella, hedebo is a form of needle lace which was originally produced by farming women in the area of Zealand known as Hedebo or Hedeboegnen, the flat heathland bordered by Copenhagen, Roskilde and Køge. Up to the 1870s, the embroidered articles decorated the peasants' living rooms or featured on their festive clothing. Towels and pillows as well as women's shifts and men's shirts were typically decorated in the hedebo style. Many of the items in a bride's trousseau or bridal chest were painstakingly prepared for a future wedding.

In the late 19th century, Copenhagen families began to show interest in hedebo, increasingly acquiring items for their own homes. Many were crafted by the wet nurses whom they employed. Designs were often adapted to match the clothing styles of the middle classes. By the 20th century, it became fashionable for educated Copenhagen women also to sew hebedo embroidery themselves.

When hedebo was replaced in the late 19th century by more modern styles, peasants sold their embroidery in Copenhagen for substantial sums. Many items were nevertheless passed down as families appreciated the value of the embroidery. Recognized by the Danish Folk Museum as a national treasure in the 1870s, many Zealand museums now have substantial collections of hedebo items.

== Stitching styles ==
Hedebo styles have developed over the years, first by the farming women and later by embroidery experts living in the more wealthy areas of Copenhagen. The earlier styles (1700–1870), known as Hedebosyning (Hedebo sewing), consisted of white linen work for creating articles for private use. They can be classified under seven distinct styles.

=== Counted thread work ===
Known in Danish as tællesyning, with its geometric patterns, it is a style common throughout Denmark and the rest of Europe. Nevertheless, the number of finely stitched hedebo articles is particularly high. Designs can be based on triangles, trees, animals and human figures. The style is used for shirts, bed linen and handkerchiefs.

=== Drawn thread work ===
Drawn thread work or dragværk, another whitework technique, dates from the second half of the 18th century. Employing the warp and weft approach, white thread is drawn across the width of the white linen before figures such as animals are sewn in. The embroidery follows the length and intersections of the fabric. The remaining threads can be decorated in different designs with buttonhole stitches.

=== Square cutwork ===
Square cutwork or rudesyning was used until the end of the 19th century for monograms and for decorating towels. From the ground material, squares are cut out, leaving some threads between the squares. A darning stitch can then be used to fill them in, creating patterns of animals, human figures, plants and trees.

=== Hvidsøm ===
The hvidsøm whitework technique combines drawn thread and cutwork. A type of embroidered lace, it consists of two rows of chain stitches around the main motif. It was used for both clothing and household items such as pillow cases and towels. It was also used by middle class women for tea cosies and table cloths until the mid-20th century. Motifs include flowers, hearts, leaves and animals.

=== Baldyring ===
Combining the drawn thread and counted thread techniques, baldyring is based on reticella needlework. It was used for pillow cases, men's shirts, women's shifts as well as for towels and sheets. Its use extended to the whole of Denmark by the end of the 19th century. It also became fashionable among urban women until about 1920.

=== Hedebo needle lace ===
Udklipshedebo or Hedebo needle lace, is often considered a freestyle combination of cut work and embroidered lace techniques. It also incorporated button stitch and scallop stitch. Patterns are filled with curves, points and wheels or rings, often surrounded by leaves. It was used for costumes, small cloths and collars. It could be found in homes throughout Denmark for serviettes, tea cosies and decorated collars for women.
