= Counted-thread embroidery =

Technique in embroidery

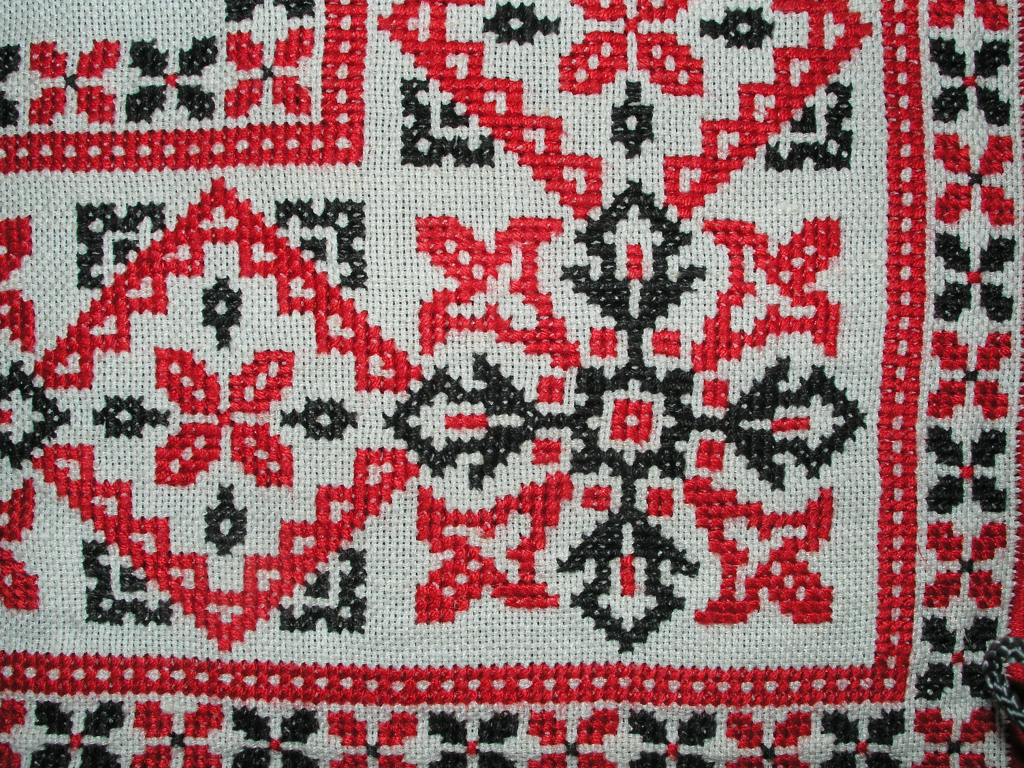
Counted cross-stitch embroidery, Hungary, mid-20th century

Counted-thread embroidery is any embroidery in which the number of warp and weft yarns in a fabric are methodically counted for each stitch, resulting in uniform-length stitches and a precise, uniform embroidery pattern. Even-weave fabric is typically used, producing a symmetrical image, as both warp and weft yarns are evenly spaced.

The opposite of counted-thread embroidery is free embroidery.

== Types of counted-thread embroidery ==
Among the counted-thread embroidery techniques are:

- Assisi
- Bargello, or Florentine work
- Blackwork
- Canvas work
- Cross-stitch
- Hardanger
- Needlepoint
- Drawn thread work
- Tatreez

== See also ==
- Pixel art
