= Balanced fabric =

Type of fabric

Cross-stitch on even-weave fabric, Hungary, mid-20th century.

A balanced fabric is one in which the warp and the weft are of the same size. In weaving, these are generally called "balanced plain weaves" or just "balanced weaves", while in embroidery the term "even-weave" is more common.

== Balanced plain weave ==
A balanced plain weave is a fabric in which the warp threads and the weft threads are equally spaced, and are identical or similar in size. In addition to the same sett, the yarn is the same in the warp and weft. The term can be used for a tabby weave or a basketweave.

Balanced weaves have also been called "50/50 plain webs", and are a subset of plain weaves. Unbalanced weaves, in which warp and weft differ in size, may be either warp-dominant or weft-dominant fabrics. The primary advantage of balanced weaves is that they are potentially stronger than other basic weaves.

== Even-weave ==
An even-weave fabric or canvas, a term mostly used in embroidery, is any textile where the warp and weft threads are of the same size. Even-weave fabrics include even-weave aida cloth, linen, and needlepoint canvas. These fabrics are typically required as foundations for counted-thread embroidery styles such as blackwork, cross-stitch, and needlepoint, so that a stitch of the same "count" (that is, crossing the same number of fabric threads) will be the same length whether it crosses warp or weft threads.

== Bibliography ==
- Bath, Virginia Churchill (1979). Needlework in America. Viking Press. ISBN 0-670-50575-7.
- Caulfield, Sophia Frances Anne & Saward, Blanche C. (1885). The Dictionary of Needlework.
- Complete Guide to Needlework. Reader's Digest Association. 1979. ISBN 0-89577-059-8.
