= Outline of crafts =

Skills performed manually

The following outline is provided as an overview of and topical guide to crafts:

A craft or trade is a pastime or an occupation that requires particular skills and knowledge of skilled work. In a historical sense, particularly the Middle Ages and earlier, the term is usually applied to people occupied in small scale production of goods, or their maintenance, for example by tinkers. The traditional term craftsman is nowadays often replaced by artisan and by craftsperson.

A craft is a work of physical expression drawn from imagination or existing culture, largely by using hands. A craft is typically birthed by creativity and intentional design, through the application of skill(s)/ techniques and can extend across a wide range of areas from dance, embroidery to photography. Good 'craftsmanship' is marked by dexterity and experience.

== What type of thing are crafts? ==
Crafts as a whole can be described as all of the following:

- One of the arts – as an art form, crafts are an outlet of human expression, usually influenced by culture and which in turn help to change culture. Crafts are a physical manifestation of the internal human creative impulse and typically involves the use of hands to create the artform.
  - One of the visual arts – visual arts is a class of art forms, including painting, sculpture, photography, printmaking and others, that focus on the creation of works which are primarily visual in nature.

== Types of crafts ==
=== Ceramics and glass crafts ===
Ceramics and ceramic arts include:

- Azulejo
- Cameo glass
- Earthenware
- Glass and glass art
  - Bubblegram
  - Glass beadmaking
  - Glass etching
  - Glassblowing
  - Glassmaking
  - Stained glass and lead came and copper foil glasswork
- Glassware
- Mosaic
- Porcelain
  - Bone china
- Pottery
- Stoneware

=== Fibre and textile crafts ===
See also Needlework below

- Bobbin lace
- Felting
- Knotting
  - Chinese knotting
  - Macramé
- Rope-making
- Rug hooking
- Rug making
- Spinning
- Stitch
- Tatting
- Weaving

=== Flower crafts ===
- Bouquet
- Floral Design
- Ikebana

=== Leatherwork ===
- Boiled leather making
- Leather carving
- Leather crafting (including dyeing, painting, and stamping)

=== Houseware ===
- Basket weaving (also called basketry, basket making)
- Cooper

=== Fashion ===
Cloth

- Dyeing and Printing
  - Batik

Jewelry

- Beadwork

=== Needlework ===
- Applique
- Crochet
- Embroidery
  - Canvas work
    - Bargello
    - Berlin wool work
    - Needlepoint
  - Counted-thread
    - Blackwork
    - Cross-stitch
    - Whitework
  - Filet lace
  - Surface embroidery
    - Brazilian embroidery
    - Candlewicking
    - Couching
    - Crewel embroidery
    - Goldwork
    - Ribbon embroidery
    - Sashiko
    - Stumpwork
- Knitting
- Nålebinding
- Needlelace
- Patchwork
- Quilting
  - Broderie perse
  - English paper piecing
  - Trapunto
- Sewing
- Spool knitting

=== Paper crafts ===
Paper crafts include:

- Bookbinding
- Calligraphy
- Cast paper
- Decoupage
- Iris folding
- Origami
- Paper embossing
- Paper marbling
- Paper model
- Papercutting
- Papermaking
- Papier-mâche
- Parchment craft
- Quilling
- Scrapbooking
- Paper burning art

=== Wood and furniture crafts ===
- Cabinet making
- Carpentry
- Intarsia
- Lacquer art
- Marquetry
- Spoon carving
- Timber framing
- Upholstery
- Wood burning
- Wood carving
- Woodturning
- Woodworking
  - Green woodworking

=== Stone crafts ===
- Flintknapping
- Mosaics and inlaying
- Stone carving
- Stonemasonry

=== Metal crafts ===
- Blacksmithing
- Casting
- Clockmaking
- Cloisonné
- Coppersmith
- Enamelling
- Farrier
- Jewellery
  - Goldsmith
  - Lapidary
- Knife making
- Locksmithing
- Metalworking - metalsmith
- Whitesmith
- metal wire art
- Silversmith
- Tinware - tinsmith
- Watchmaking
- Weaponsmith - sword making, armorer, gunsmith, fletching

== Printing ==
- Screen Printing
- lithography
- Block Printing
- transfer Printing
- Flexography

== General crafts concepts ==
- American craft
- Artisan
- Arts and Crafts
- Handicraft
- Master craftsman
- Sloyd
- Studio craft
- Studio pottery

== See also ==
- Rural crafts
- Stagecraft
