= Handicraft =

Item production entirely by hand or with simple tools

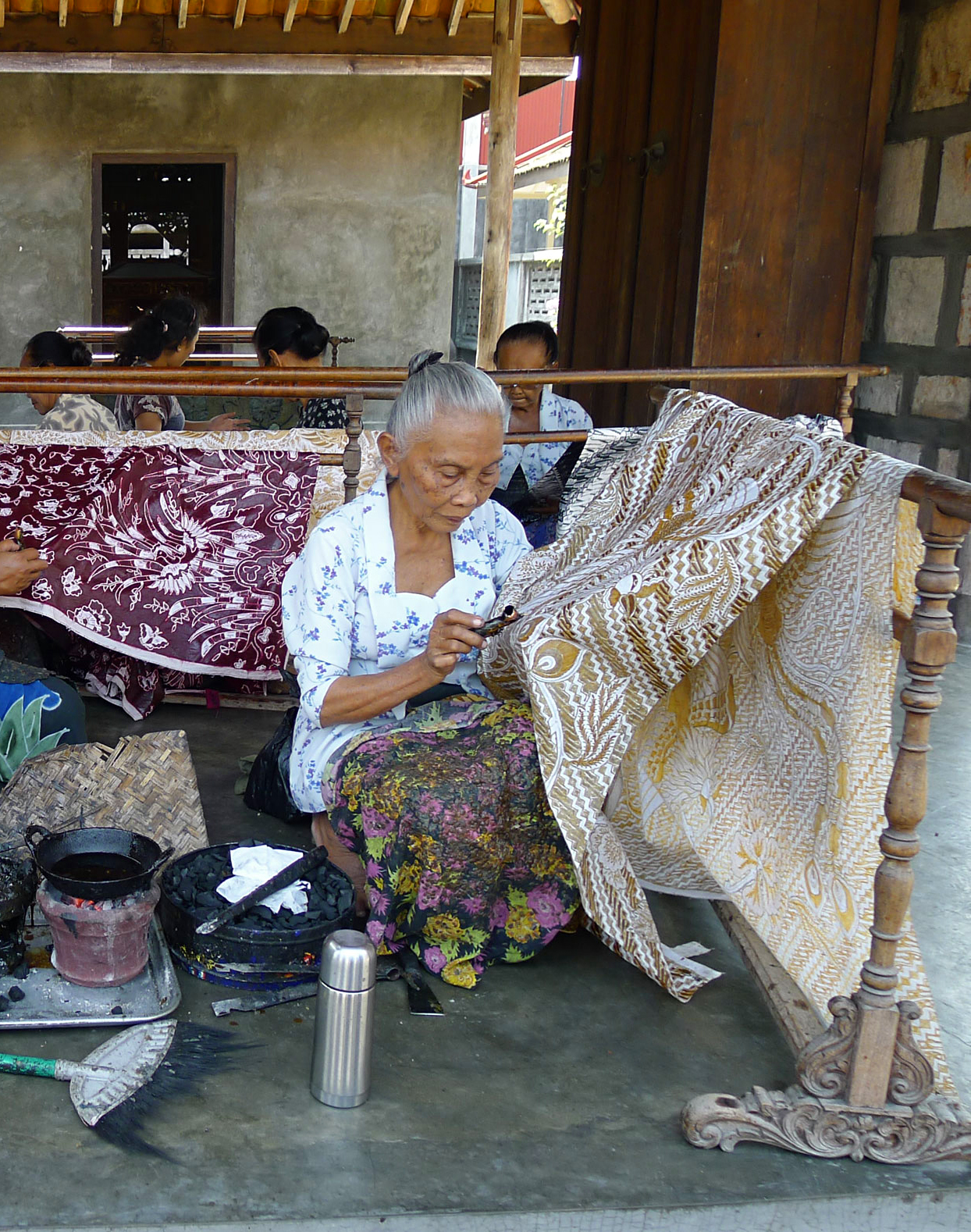
Batik craftswomen in Java, Indonesia

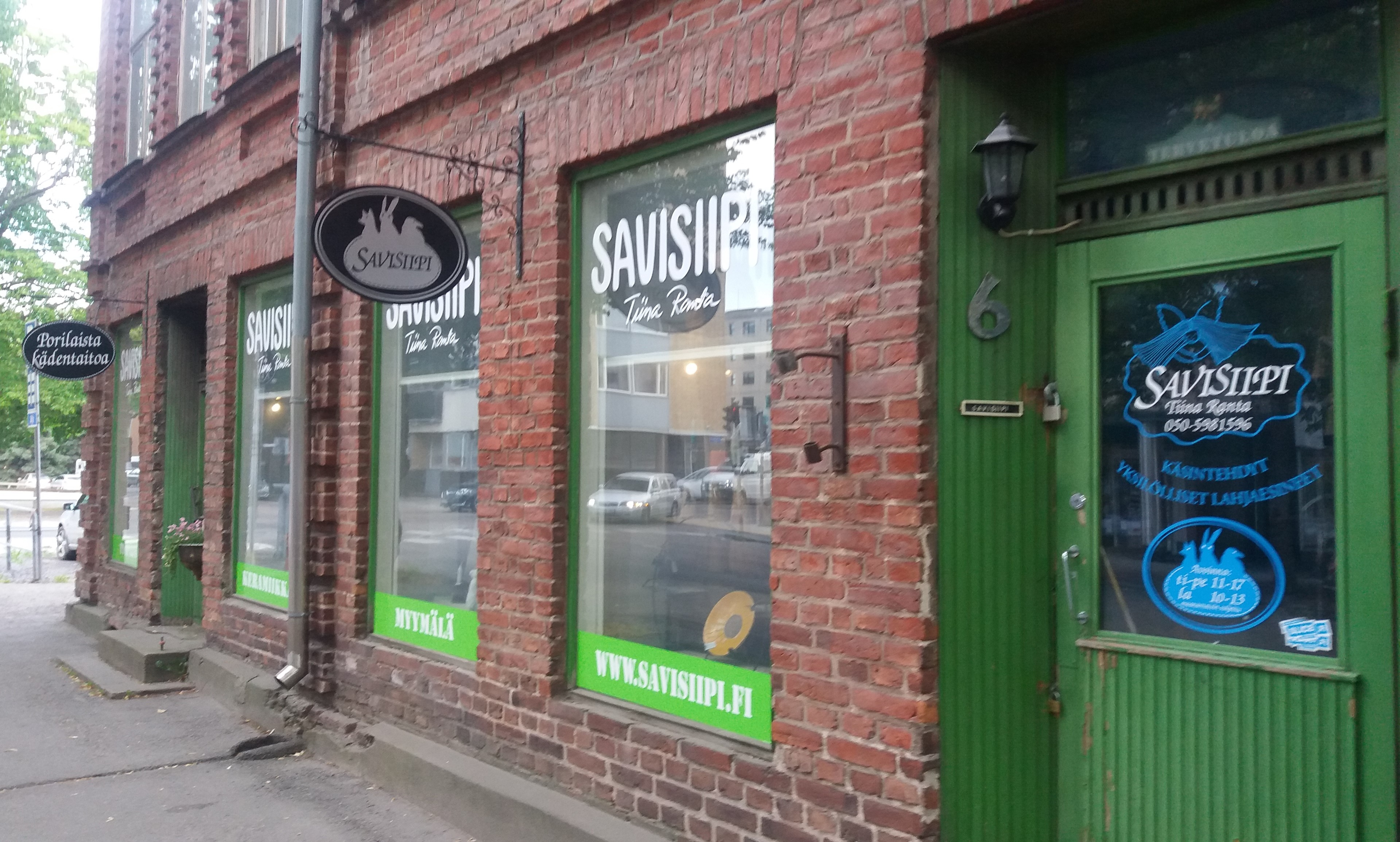
Savisiipi handicrafts store in Pori, Finland

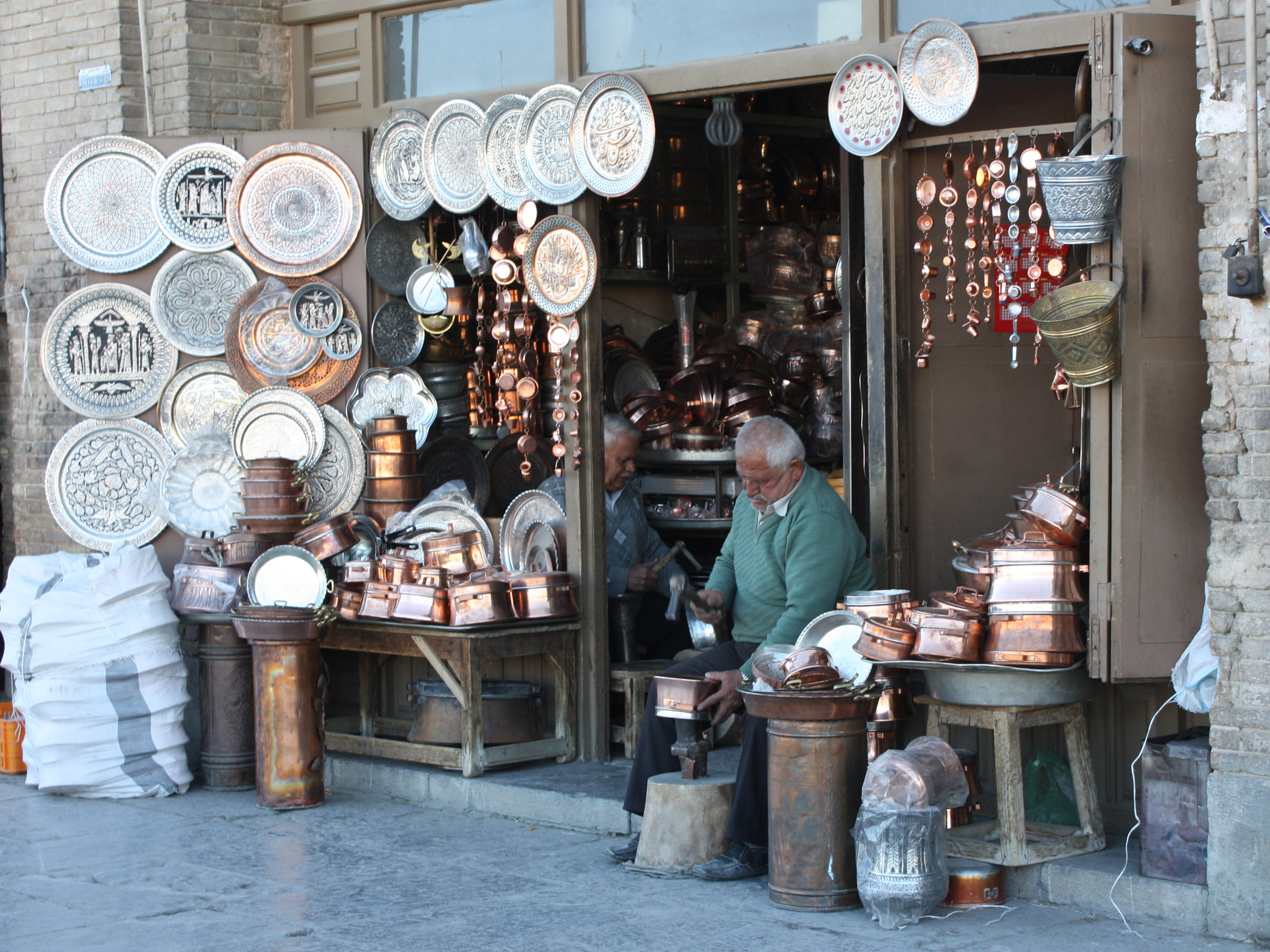
A handicraft Selling-Factory shop, Isfahan, Iran

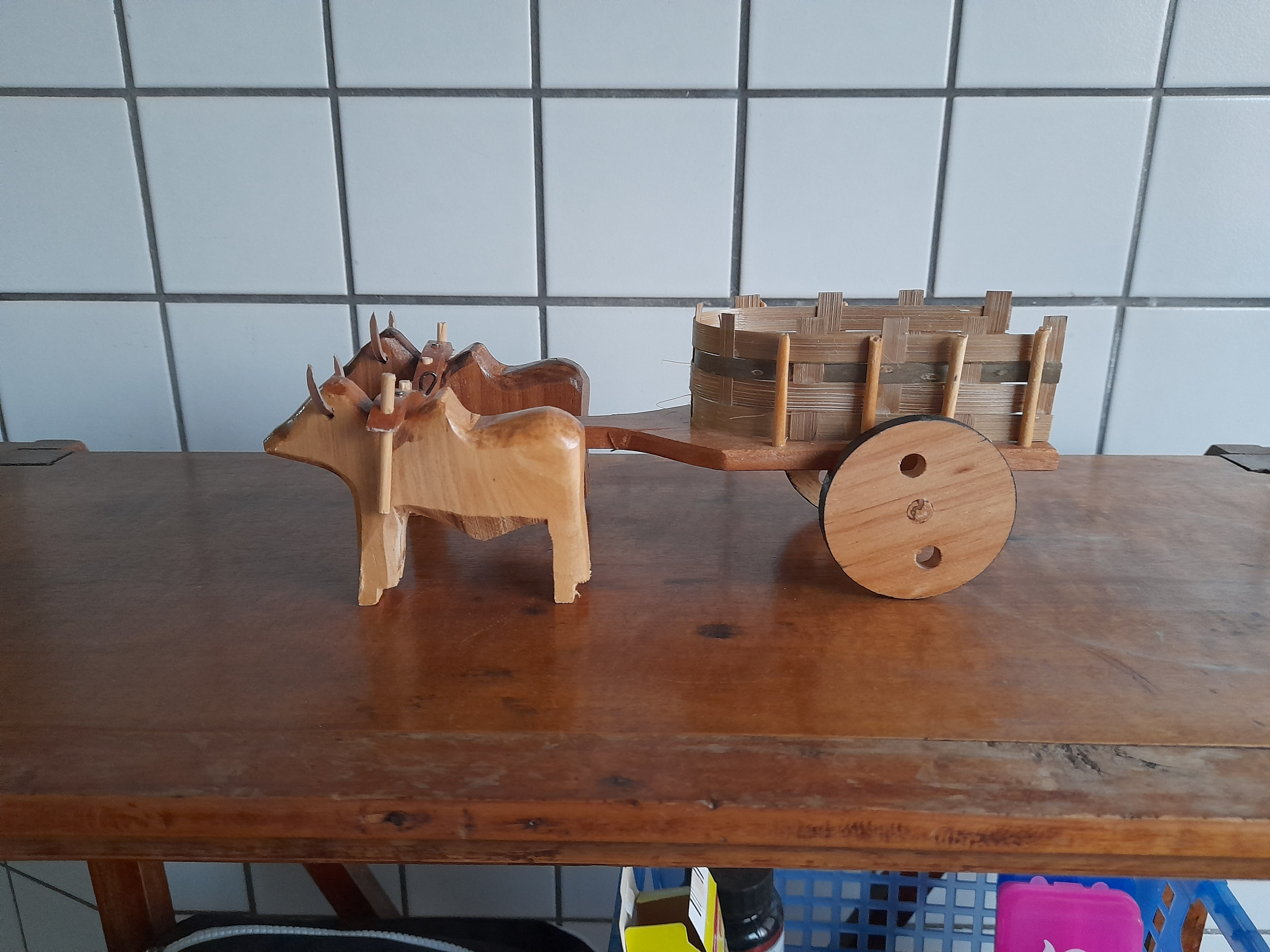
Artesanato Mineiro

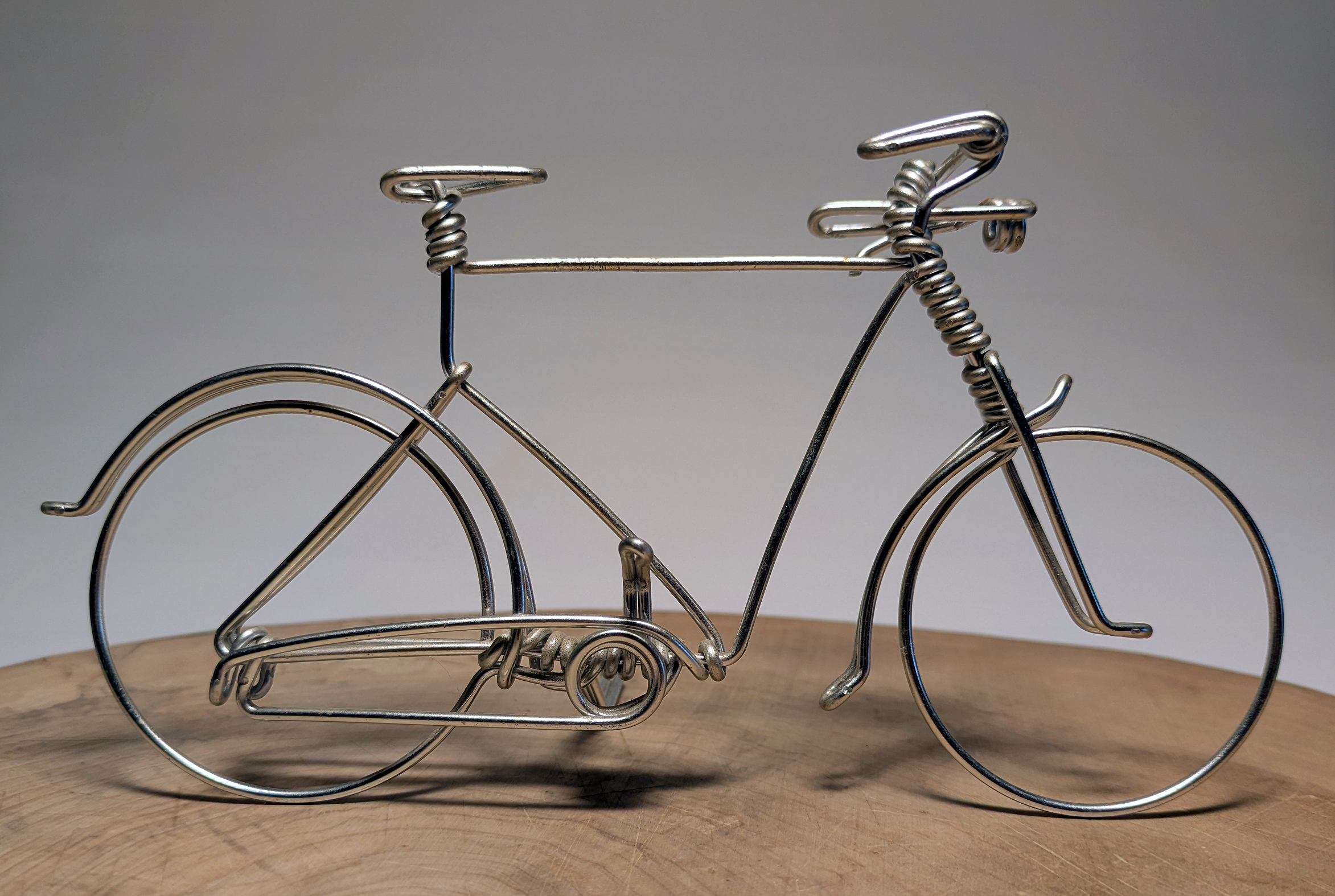
Bicycle made from a single long metal wire

A handicraft is a traditional main sector of craft making and applies to a wide range of creative and design activities that are related to making things with one's hands and skill, including work with textiles, moldable and rigid materials, paper, plant fibers, clay, etc. Usually, the term is applied to traditional techniques of creating items (whether for personal use or as products) that are both practical and aesthetic. Handicraft industries are those that produce things with hands to meet the needs of the people in their locality without using machines.

Collective terms for handicrafts include artisanry, crafting, and handcrafting. The term arts and crafts is also applied, especially in the United States and mostly to hobbyists' and children's output rather than items crafted for daily use, but this distinction is not formal, and the term is easily confused with the Arts and Crafts design movement, which is in fact as practical as it is aesthetic.

Handicraft has its roots in the rural crafts—the material-goods necessities—of ancient civilizations, and many specific crafts have been practiced for centuries, while others are modern inventions or popularizations of crafts which were originally practiced in a limited geographic area. One of the oldest handicraft is Dhokra; this is a sort of metal casting that has been used in India for over 5,000 years and is still used. In Iranian Baluchistan, women still make redware hand-made pottery with dotted ornaments, much similar to the 4,000-year-old pottery tradition of Kalpouregan, an archaeological site near the village.

Many handcrafters use natural, even entirely indigenous, materials while others may prefer modern, non-traditional materials, and even upcycle industrial materials. The individual artisanship of a handcrafted item is the paramount criterion; those made by mass production or machines are not handicraft goods.

Seen as developing the skills and creative interests of students, generally and sometimes towards a particular craft or trade, handicrafts are often integrated into educational systems, both informally and formally. Most crafts require the development of skill and the application of patience but can be learned by virtually anyone.

Like folk art, handicraft output often has cultural and/or religious significance, and increasingly may have a political message as well, as in craftivism. Many crafts become very popular for brief periods of time (a few months, or a few years), spreading rapidly among the crafting population as everyone emulates the first examples, then their popularity wanes until a later resurgence.

== The Arts and Crafts movement in the West ==
The Arts and Crafts movement originated as a late-19th-century design reform and social movement principally in Europe, North America and Australia, and continues today. Its proponents are motivated by the ideals of movement founders, such as William Morris and John Ruskin, who proposed that in pre-industrial societies, such as the European Middle Ages, people had achieved fulfillment through the creative process of handicrafts. This was held up in contrast to what was perceived to be the alienating effects of industrial labor.

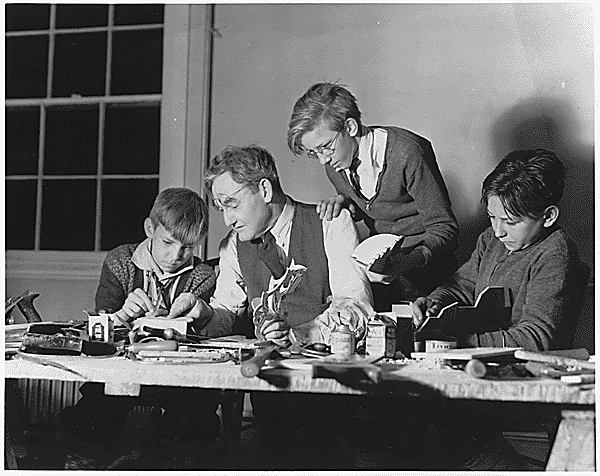
Works Progress Administration, Crafts Class, US, 1935

These activities were called crafts because originally many of them were professions under the craft guild system. Adolescents were apprenticed to a master craftsman and refined their skills over a period of years in exchange for low wages. By the time their training was complete, they were well equipped to set up in trade for themselves, earning their living with the skill that could be traded directly within the community, often for goods and services. The Industrial Revolution and the increasing mechanization of production processes gradually reduced or eliminated many of the roles professional craftspeople played, and today many handicrafts are increasingly seen, especially when no longer the mainstay of a formal vocational trade, as a form of hobby, folk art and sometimes fine art.

The term handicrafts can also refer to the products themselves of such artisanal efforts, that require specialized knowledge, maybe highly technical in their execution, require specialized equipment and/or facilities to produce, involve manual labor or a blue-collar work ethic, are accessible to the general public, and are constructed from materials with histories that exceed the boundaries of Western "fine art" tradition, such as ceramics, glass, textiles, metal and wood. These products are produced within a specific community of practice, and while they mostly differ from the products produced within the communities of art and design, the boundaries often overlap, resulting in hybrid objects. Additionally, as the interpretation and validation of art is frequently a matter of context, an audience may perceive handcrafted objects as art objects when these objects are viewed within an art context, such as in a museum or in a position of prominence in one's home.

== In modern education ==
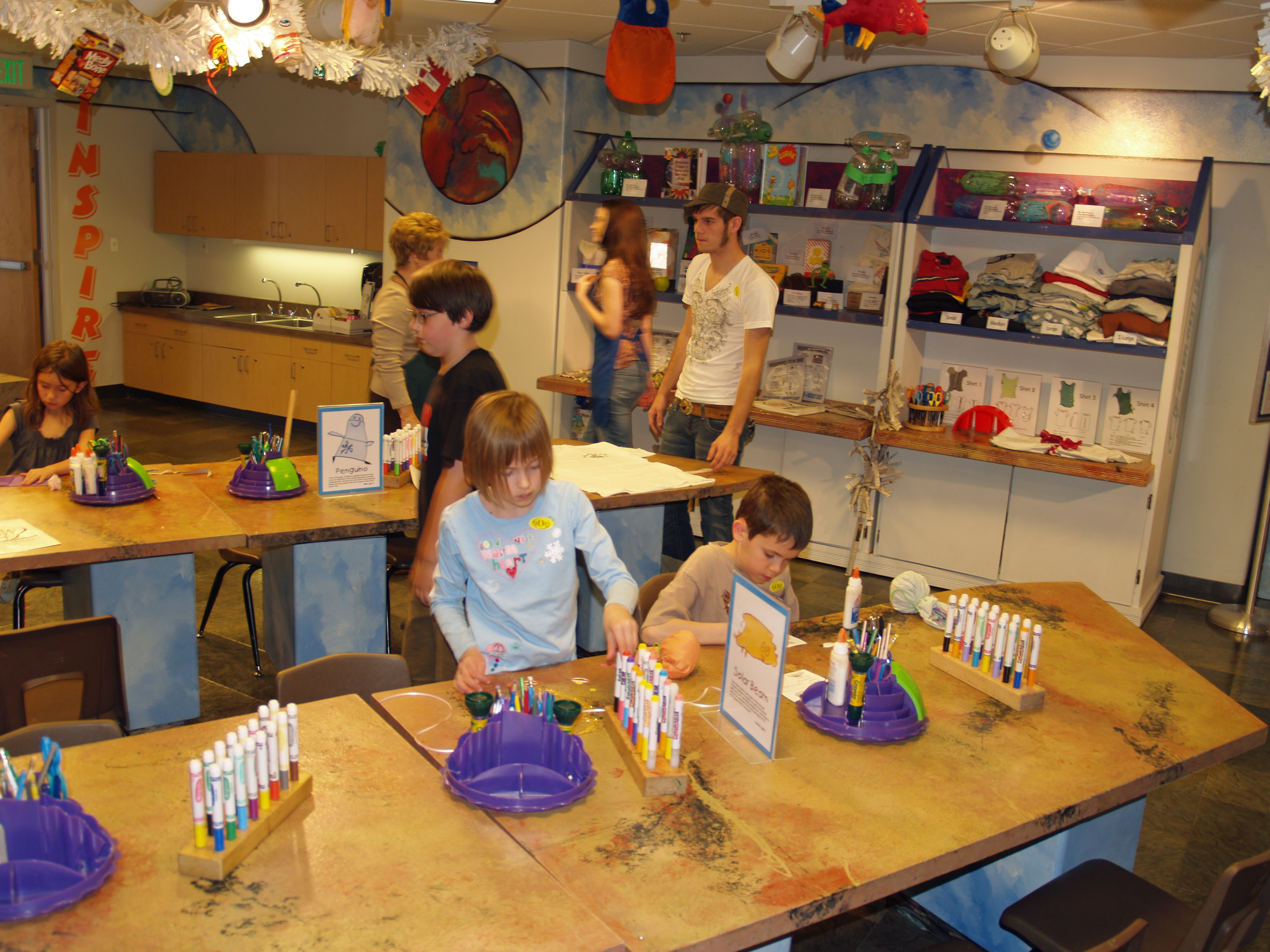
At the Buell Children's Museum in Pueblo, Colorado, children and their guardians partake in "arts and crafts" (i.e. handicrafts).

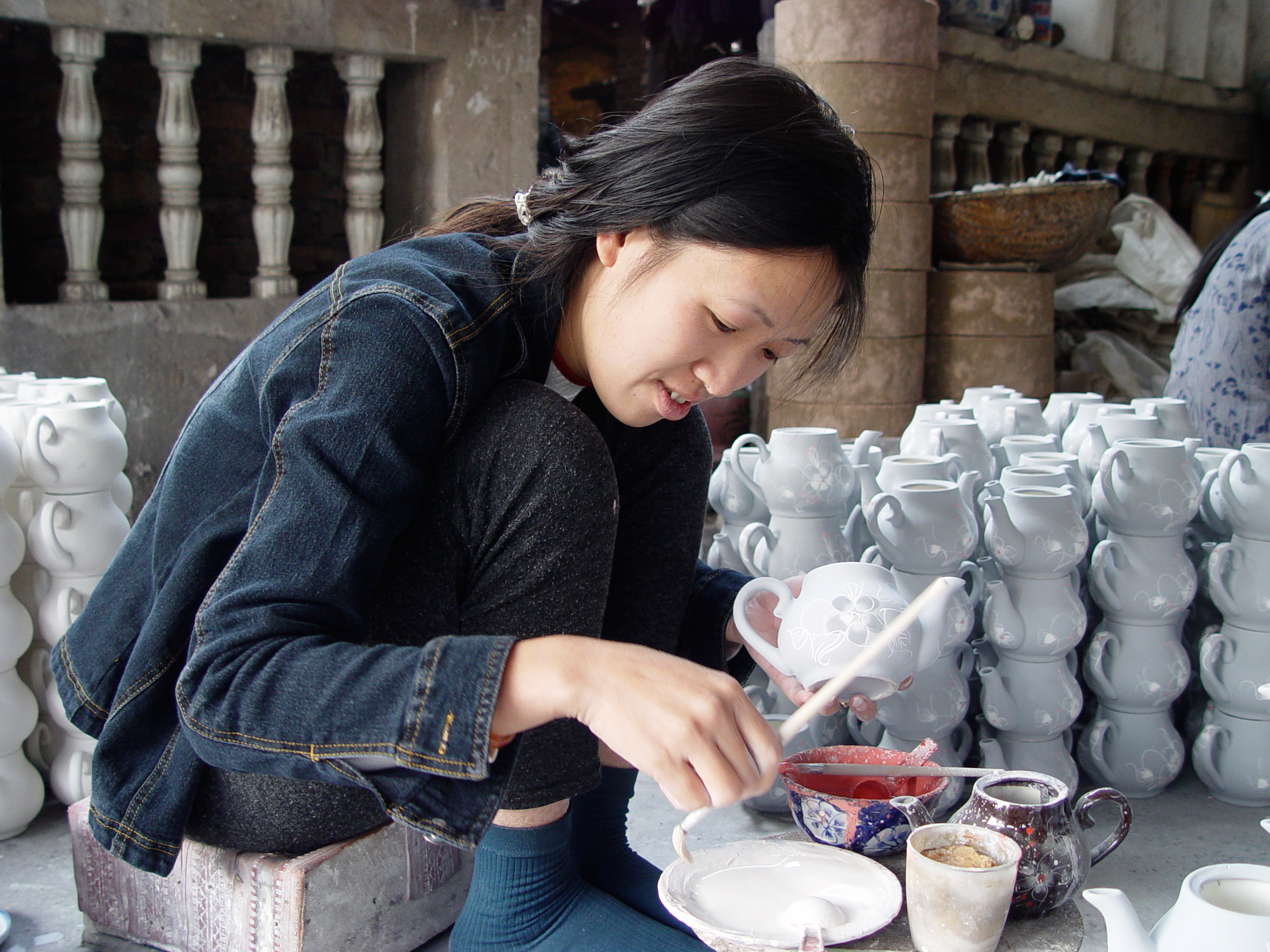
Draw and color Bat-Trang ceramic

Simple "arts and crafts" projects are a common elementary and middle school activity in both mainstream and alternative education systems around the world.

In some of the Scandinavian or Nordic countries, more advanced handicrafts form part of the formal, compulsory school curriculum, and are collectively referred to as slöjd in Swedish, and käsityö in Finnish. Students learn how to work mainly with metal, textile and wood, not for professional training purposes as in American vocational–technical schools, but with the aim to develop children's and teens' practical skills, such as everyday problem-solving ability, tool use, and understanding of the materials that surround us for economical, cultural and environmental purposes.

Secondary schools and college and university art departments increasingly provide elective options for more handicraft-based arts, in addition to formal "fine arts", a distinction that continues to fade throughout the years, especially with the rise of studio craft, i.e. the use of traditional handicrafts techniques by professional fine artists.

Many community centers and schools run evening or day classes and workshops, for adults and children, offering to teach basic craft skills in a short period of time.

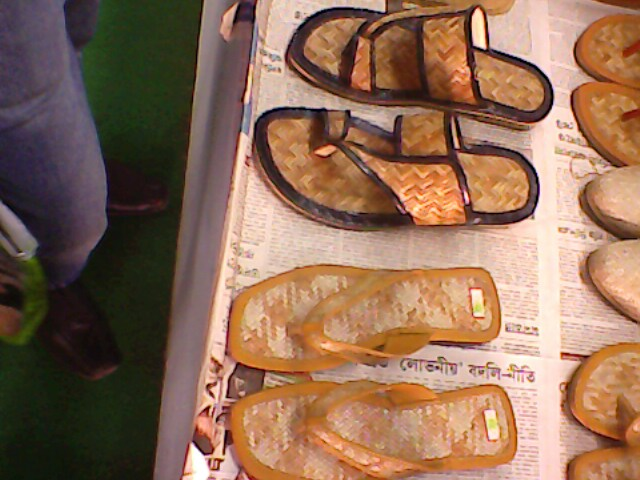
Handcrafted shoes from bamboo made by artists of West Bengal, India, at a fair in Kolkata

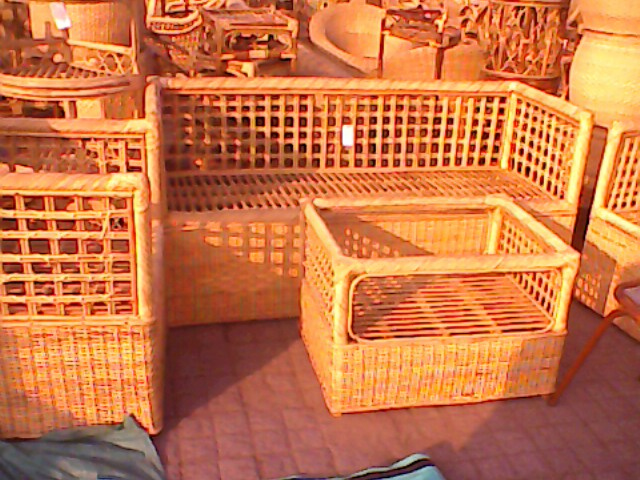
A handmade sofa set made from fibers extracted from bamboo at a fair in Kolkata, made by artists of West Bengal, India

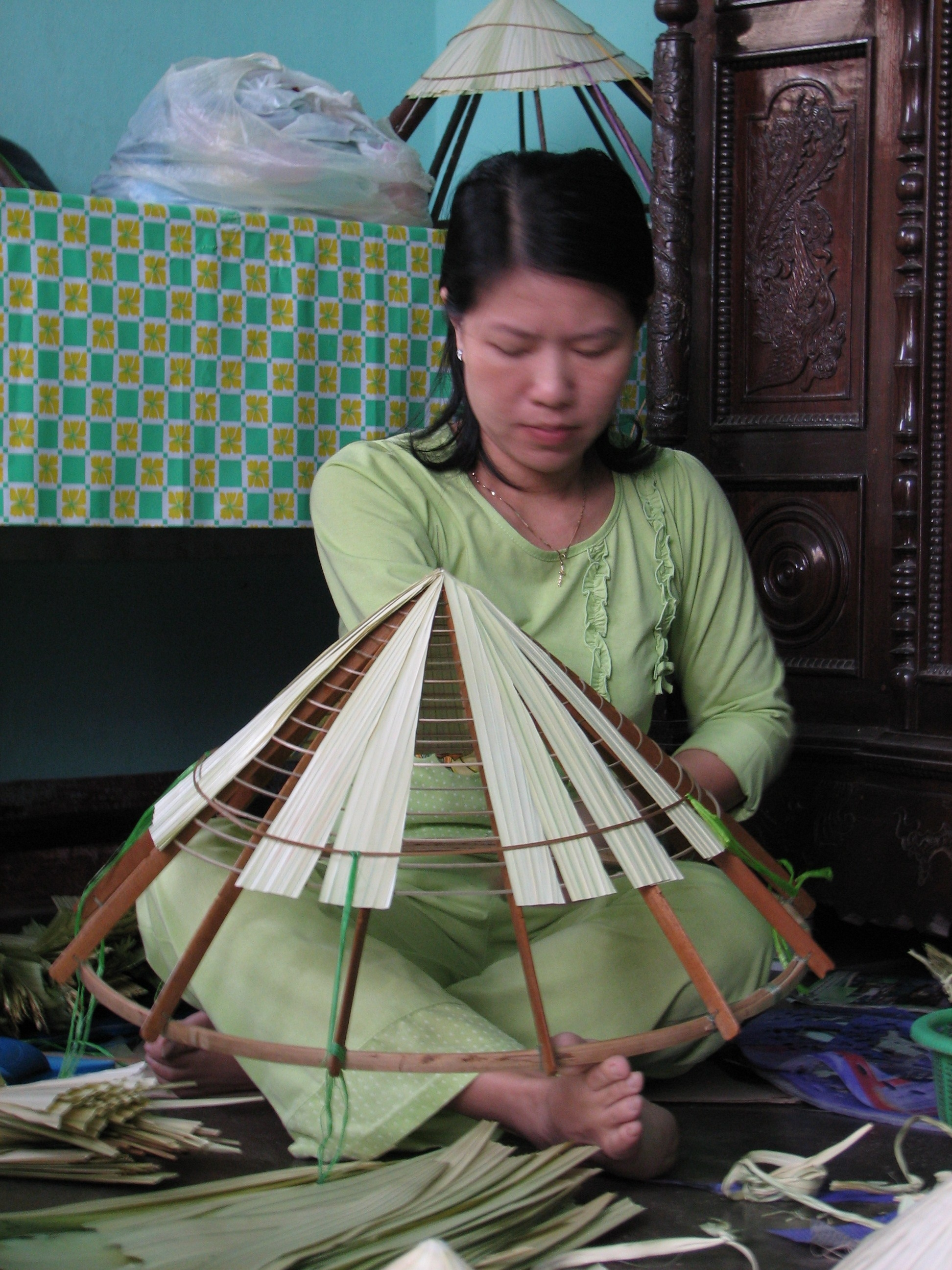
Making conical hats (nón lá) in Huế countryside, Vietnam

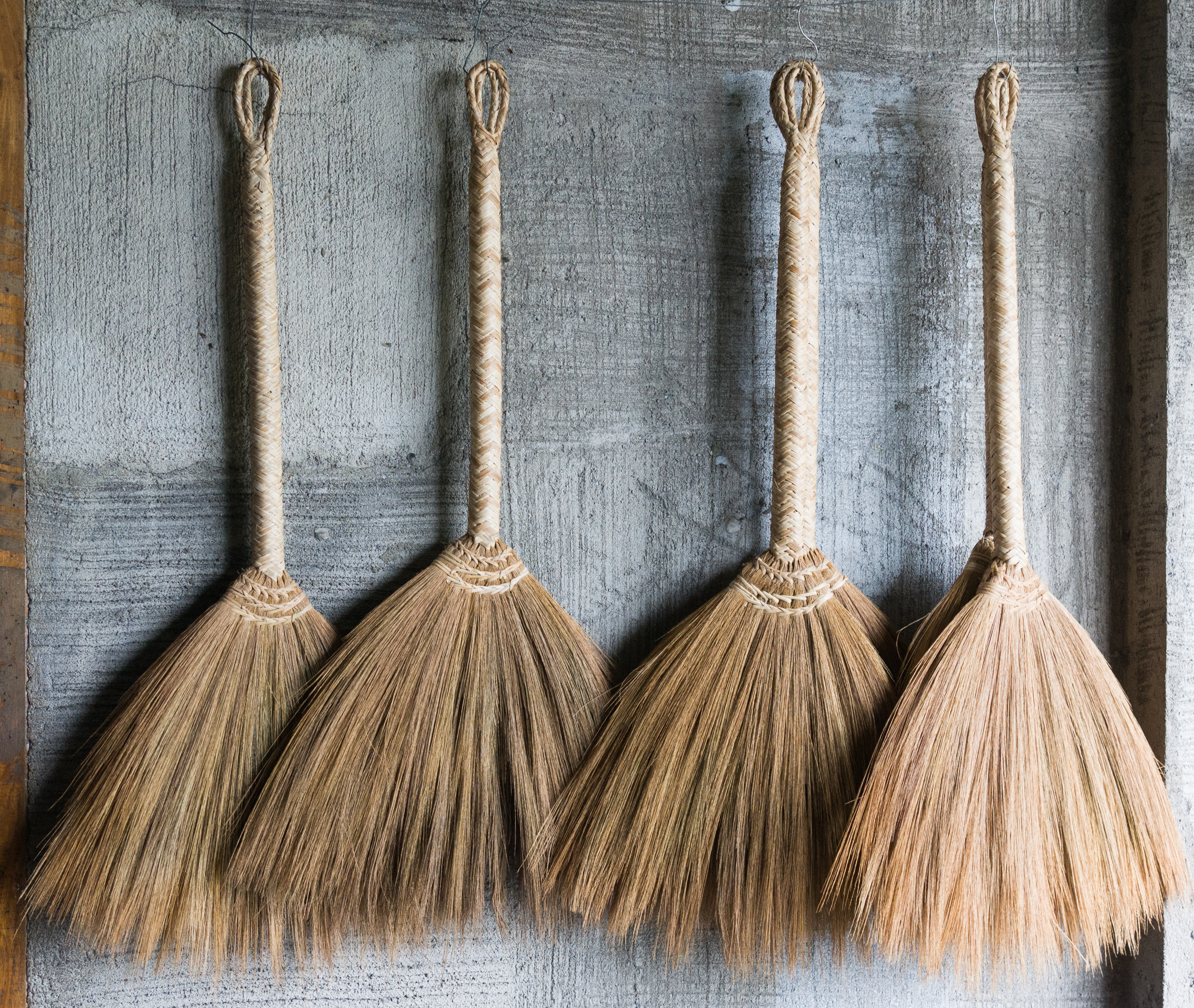
Typical Filipino handmade brooms in a restaurant of Banaue Municipal Town

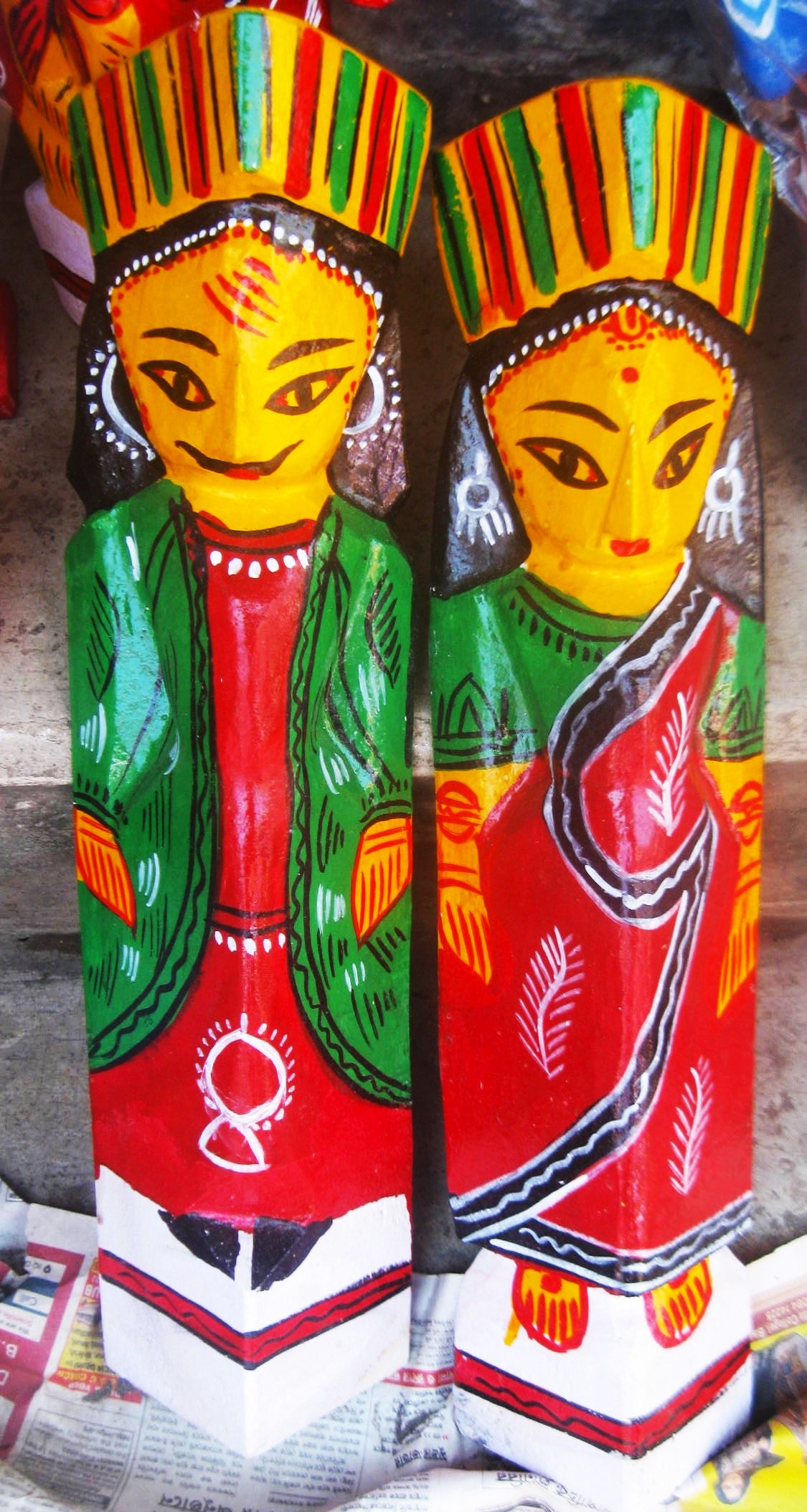
Wooden dolls from Katawa, West Bengal, India

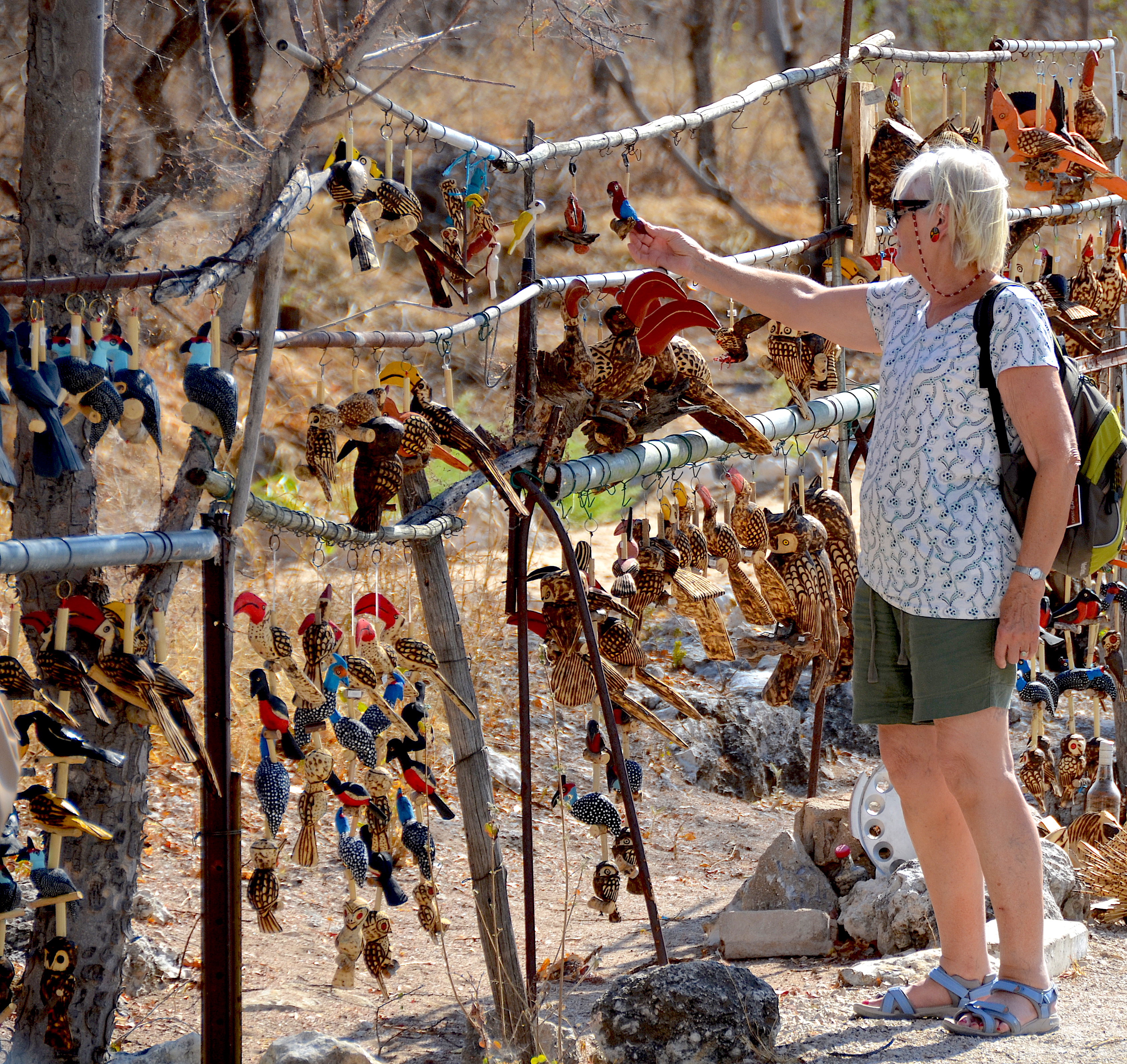
Tourist buying handicrafts in Namibia, an important source of income for some tourist destinations

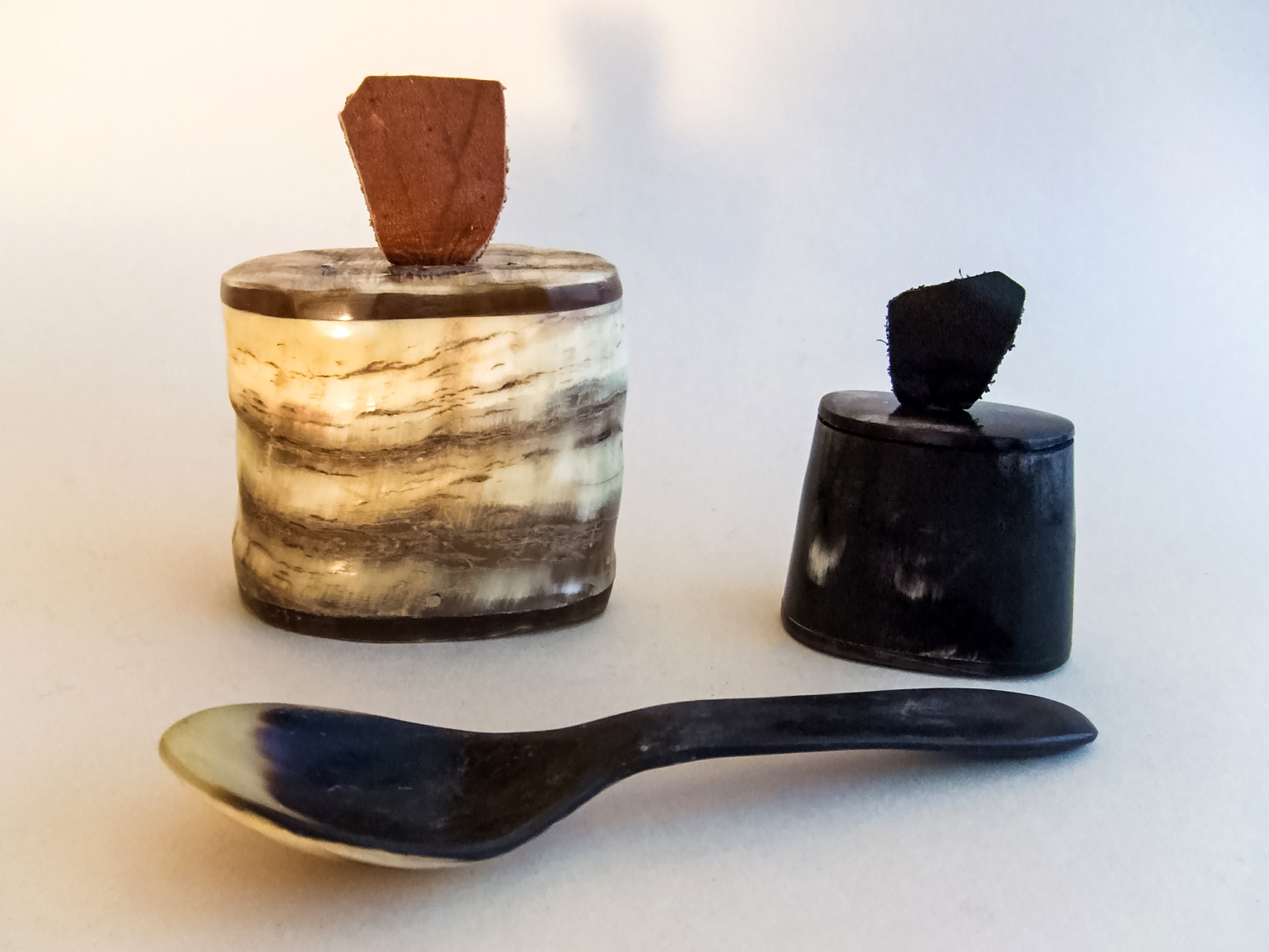
Swedish horn craft, small boxes and a teaspoon made in the 1980s from cattle horns

== Handicraft production ==
Handicraft production or craft production is a small-scale production of products using manual labor. It was especially common in the Middle Ages, during the era of the Industrial Revolution it was mainly supplanted by mass production, however, it still exists for the production of goods such as luxury goods. The "handmade effect" is a phenomenon where consumers exhibit a preference for products that are crafted by human labor rather than produced through automated or robotic processes. This preference is particularly pronounced for products with higher symbolic value, where expressing one's beliefs and personality holds greater significance. Consumers, especially in contexts emphasizing symbolic consumption, have a stronger motivation for uniqueness and associate human labor more closely with product uniqueness. In product categories where mechanical production is common, consumers are more attracted to products labeled as handmade. The positive handmade effect on product attractiveness is driven, in large part, by the perception that handmade products symbolically "contain love." The handmade effect is influenced by two key factors. Firstly, consumers express stronger intentions to purchase handmade products when buying gifts for loved ones, compared to more distant recipients. Secondly, they are willing to pay a higher price for handmade gifts when the purchase is motivated by the desire to convey love rather than simply acquiring the best-performing product.

The handicraft method of production has been used by people since ancient times. Initially, people engaged in handicraft production aimed to satisfy the needs of their own economy, however, with the development of commodity–money relations, an increasing number of goods produced by them began to be supplied to the market. Mostly these were household products: dishes, furniture, jewelry, souvenirs, clothes, shoes. However, over time, other goods, such as weapons, began to go on sale.

In pre–revolutionary Russia, handicraft production was quite widespread: about 30% of all manufactured products were produced by handicraft methods. Products were sold at fairs, and barter exchange was widespread. With the beginning of industrialisation and collectivization of the Soviet Union, the handicraft mode of production was declared "the highest degree of oppression of the working people" and ceased to exist in almost all spheres of the Soviet economy except on an informal basis.

Some state economies, such as that of Vietnam, are largely based on handicraft production. For example, in the 1950s in North Vietnam, there were more than 100,000 handicraft enterprises. In the early 1970s, even before the end of the war, handicraft production provided about half of all the products of the local industry and almost a third of the total industrial production of the republic. By 1977, after the reunification of Vietnam, there were 700,000 handicraftsmen in South Vietnam.

Handicraft production in Nepal withstands competition with industrial production and foreign goods, which is explained not only by economic and natural–geographical factors, but also by the support and encouragement of the handicraft industry from the state.

=== Craft production at the community scale ===
Craft production is a part of the informal economy in many cities, such as Istanbul, Turkey where the informal craft economy is a vital source of income for the Turkish craftspeople. Craft markets are highly dependent on social interactions, and verbal training which results in variations in the goods produced. Often, the craft economy consists of craft neighbourhoods, by which a community is structured on the craft activity present in the area.

Often used in the household, many craft goods such as historic Mumun Pottery in Korea, originated from the need for economic alternatives to meet household needs. Changes in the craft economies have often coincided with changes in household organization, and social transformations, as in Korea in the Early to Middle Mumun Period.

Given that craft production requires an intimate knowledge of methods of production from an experienced individual of that craft, the connection between trades people is highly evident in craft communities. The production of many crafts have a high technical demand, and therefore require full-time specialization of the skill-set in the form of workshops, or verbal, hands-on training. The verbal interaction between teacher and student encourages strong social bonds, which ultimately leads to cohesive communities, typical of modern-day craft communities.

=== Craft economies and location ===
Craft economies are highly related to place. Craft-specialization explores how portable goods are integral to the social relations of a community, and links groups of people together through the creation of tangible items.

Places where craft economic activity is taking place indicate strong linkages between sociopolitical organization and societal complexity. These communities are often tight-knit, with strong linkages to materials produced and sold, as well as mutual respect for fellow tradesmen in the market place.

== List of common handicrafts ==
There are almost as many variations on the theme of handicrafts as there are crafters with time on their hands, but they can be broken down into a number of categories:

=== Using plants fibers ===
- Yarn (made of cotton/silk/wool or lotus silk)
- Dyeing yarns
- Spinning (textiles)
- Crochet
- Knitting
- Embroidery
- Vegan leather
- Nålebinding
- Needlepoint
- Needlework generally
- Patchwork
- Weaving

=== Using textiles or leather ===
- Bagh prints
- Banner-making
- Batik
- Calligraphy
- Carpet
- Canvas work
- Cross-stitch
- Darning
- Embossing leather
- Felting
- Lace-making
- Leather crafting
- Lucet
- Macrame
- Millinery (hat making)
- Quilting
- Ribbon embroidery
- Rug making
- Saddle making
- Sewing generally
- Shoe making (cordwainning)
- Silkscreening
- String art
- Tapestry
- Tatting
- T-shirt art
- Tunisian Crochet
- Bagru Print
- Handmade Bags

=== Using wood, metal, clay, bone, horn, glass, or stone ===
- Bead work
- Bone carving (buffalo, camel, etc., as well as horn)
- Brass broidered coconut shell craft of Kerala
- Carpentry
- Ceramic art generally
- Chip carving
- Copper arts
- Dollhouse construction and furnishing
- Doll making
- Enameling and Grisaille
- Fretwork
- Glass etching
- Glassblowing
- Jewelry design
- Joining (woodworking)
- Lapidary
- Lath art
- Marquetry
- Metalwork
- Mosaics
- Pottery
- Puppet making
- Repoussé and chasing (embossing metal)
- Scale modeling
- Sculpture
- Silversmithing
- Stained glass
- Toy making
- Wood burning (pyrography)
- Wood carving
- Wood turning
- Woodworking generally

=== Using paper or canvas ===
- Altered books
- Artist trading cards
- Assemblage, collage in three dimensions
- Bookbinding
- Cardmaking
- Collage
- Décollage
- Decoupage
- Embossing paper
- Iris folding
- Origami or paper folding
- Paper craft generally
- Paper making
- Paper marbling
- Paper modeling, paper craft or card modeling
- Papier-mâché
- Parchment craft
- Pop-up books
- Quilling or paper filigree
- Rubber/acrylic stamping
- Scrapbooking

=== Using plants other than wood ===
- Basket weaving
- Corn dolly making
- Floral design
- Pressed flower craft
- Straw marquetry
- Seed jewelry

=== Other ===
- Balloon animals
- Cake decorating
- Candle making
- Egg decorating
- Handmade incense sticks
- Soap making

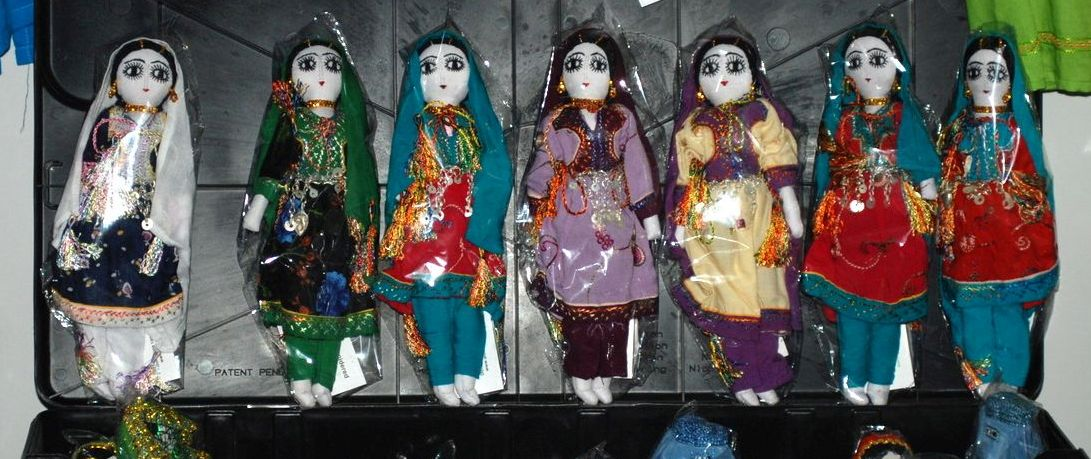
Handmade dolls featuring traditional attire in Afghanistan

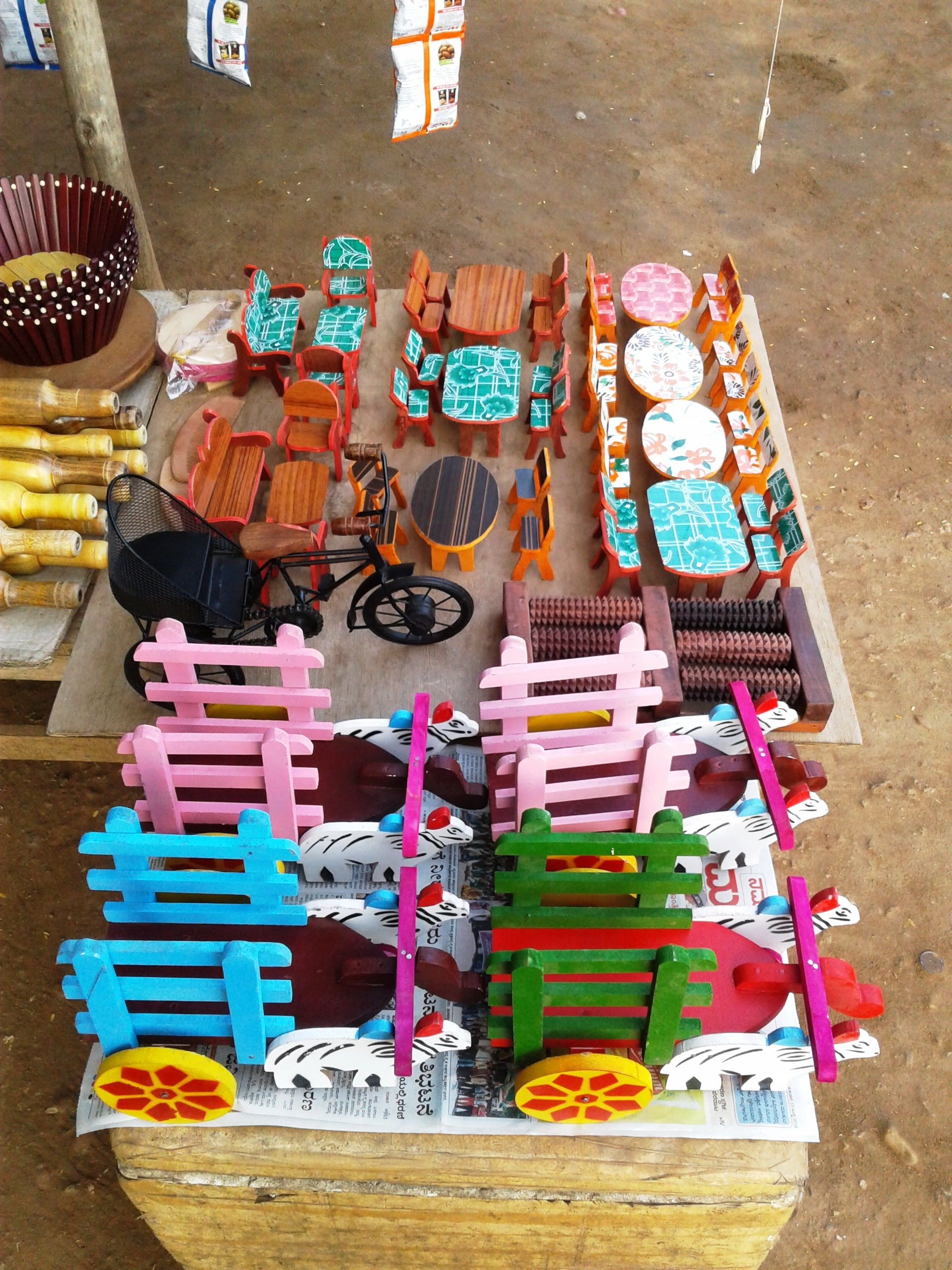
Handicrafts for sale in Mysore, India

== Sales venues ==
Handicrafts are often made for home use and decor. If sold, they are sold in direct sales, gift shops, public markets, and online shopping. In developing countries, handicrafts are sold to locals and as souvenirs to tourists. Sellers tend to speak at least a few words of common tourist languages. There are also specialty markets such as:

- Pike Place Public Market of Seattle
- Etsy, The Largest Marketplace for Handmade and Craft Supplies
- Street Artists Program of San Francisco
- Ann Arbor Art Fairs
- International Art and Craft Fair, Ouagadougou

== Asian handicrafts ==
According to the Vietnam Handicrafts Export Association (VIETCRAFT), Vietnam's handicrafts export turnover in 2023 reached US$2.2 billion, up 10.5% over 2022. The United States is Vietnam's largest export market, accounting for 35% of total export turnover. Vietnam's handicrafts industry currently has about 600 villages, with over 10 million direct workers.

Wickerwork is a traditional handicraft industry, based on the use of two basic materials, bamboo and rattan. Vietnam currently has 893 villages specializing in wickerwork, accounting for 24% of the total number of villages, including 647 bamboo and rattan villages and 246 straw and water hyacinth villages.

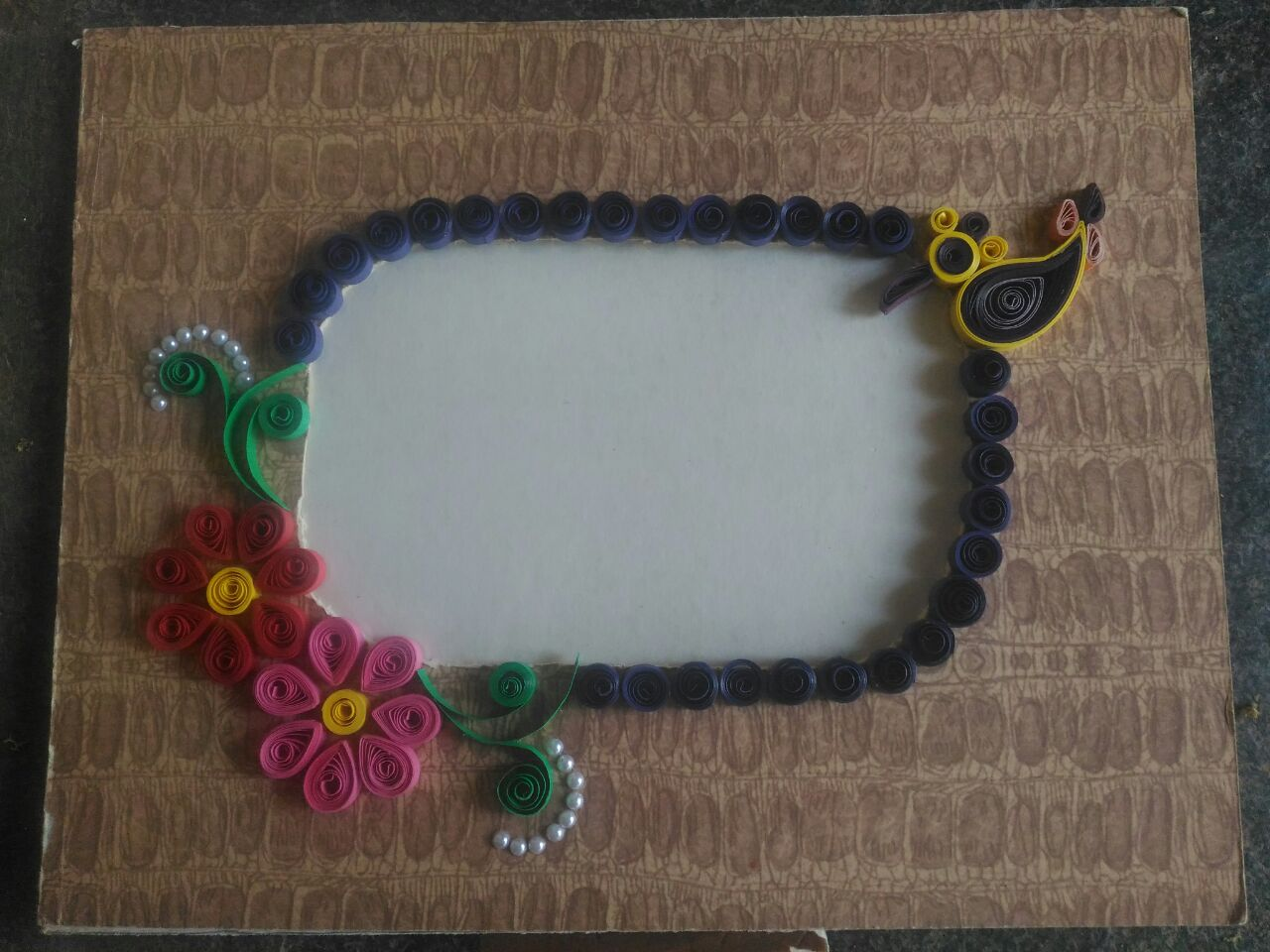
A craft done by using twilling papers

== See also ==
- Bagh print
- Craft café
- Craftsmanship
- Lean manufacturing
- Maker culture
- Preorder economy
- Screw pine craft of Kerala
- Sloyd
- Fully feathered basket
- Artisan
