= Hurdling (disambiguation) =

Hurdling may refer to:

- Hurdle, a portable woven fence, usually made of willow
- Hurdling, athletics
- Hurdling (horse race)
