= Rural crafts =

Traditional crafts production for everyday practical use

Rural crafts refers to the traditional crafts production that is carried on, simply for everyday practical use, in the agricultural countryside. Once widespread and commonplace, the survival of some rural crafts is threatened in the 21st century.

Rural crafts are not considered part of arts and crafts, as they are produced for a practical means, and not for leisure. As they are a part of a general and simple set of skills that are easily learned, they have not been produced for sale by an artisan class of makers.

== Examples ==
Examples of goods and activities produced by rural crafts would be:

- Basketry
- Boat building
- Boundary markers
- Building cob walls
- Building stone walls
- Building wattles
- Charcoal
- Coppicing
- Fish traps and fishing poles
- Hay
- Hedge laying
- Hurdles and fences
- Joinery
- Path laying
- Ponds
- Pottery
- Spinning yarn

Rural crafts will tend to vary in their styles from place to place, and will thus often contribute strongly to a sense of place.

== As a job ==
Offering training courses in, and demonstrations of, rural crafts is now becoming a viable job in some parts of the British Isles.

Rural crafts are distinguished from the "rustic" handicraft goods often seen in rural gift shops, such as at country stores.

== Gallery ==
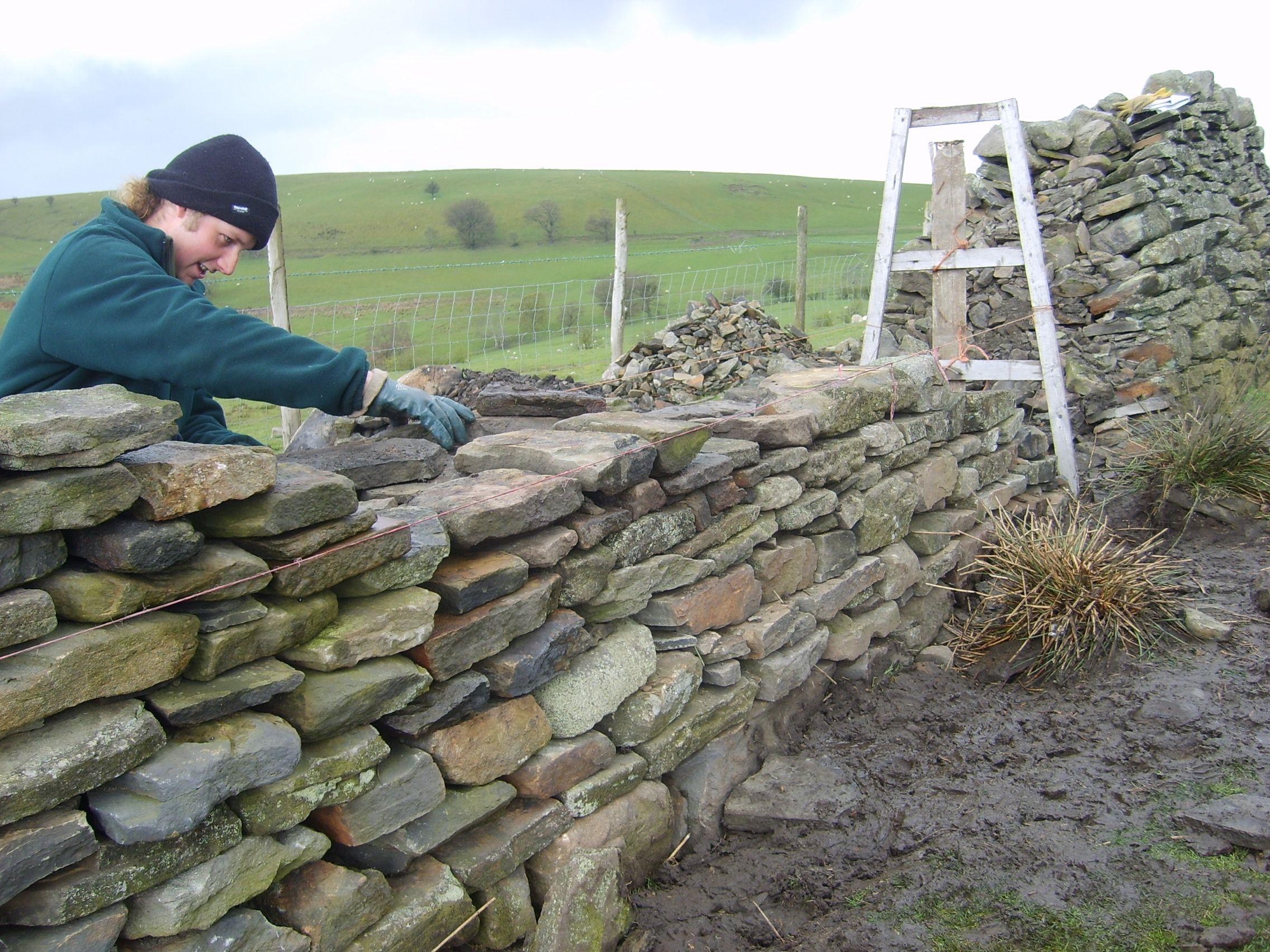
Building stone walls

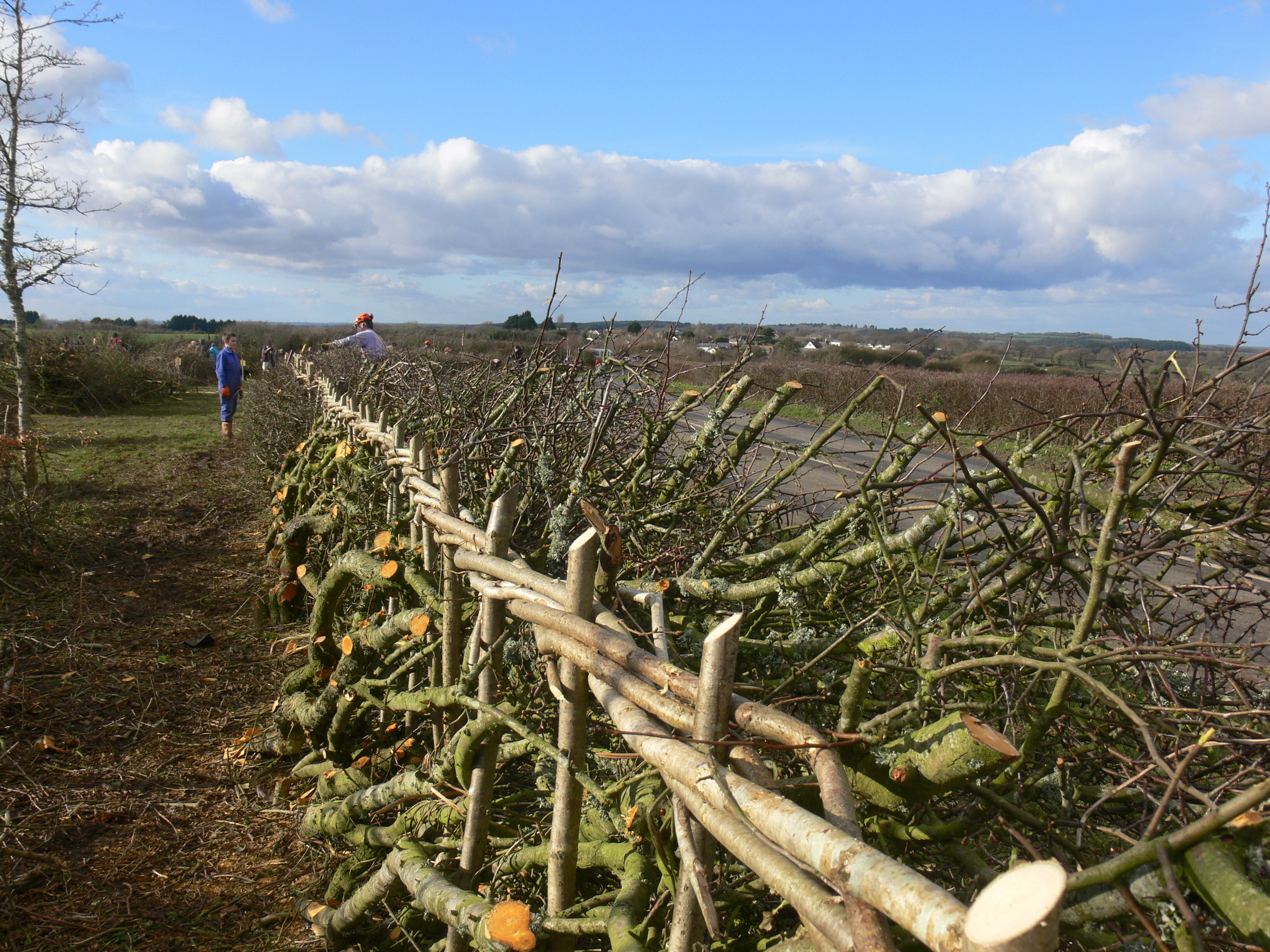
Hedge laying

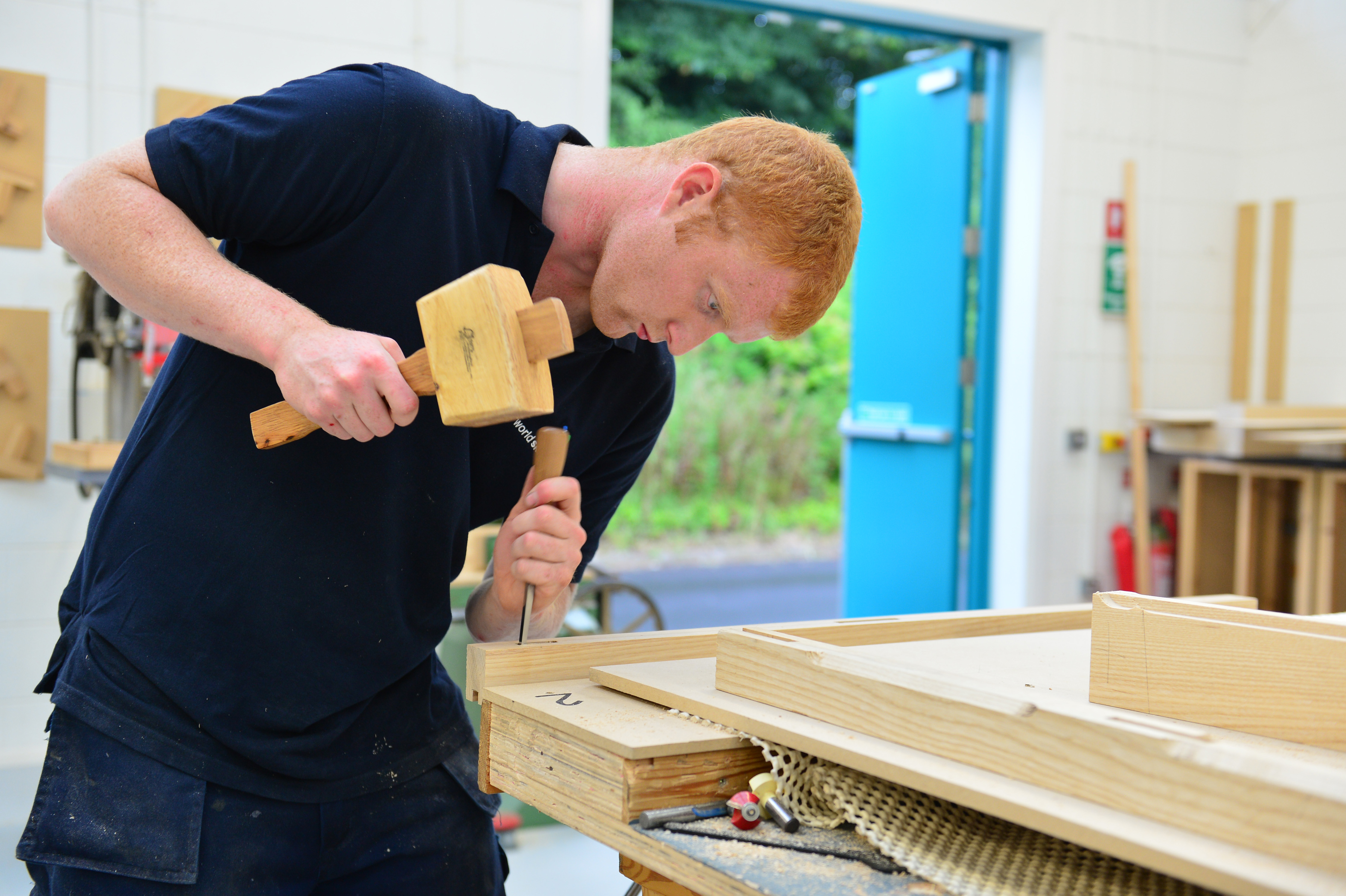
Joinery

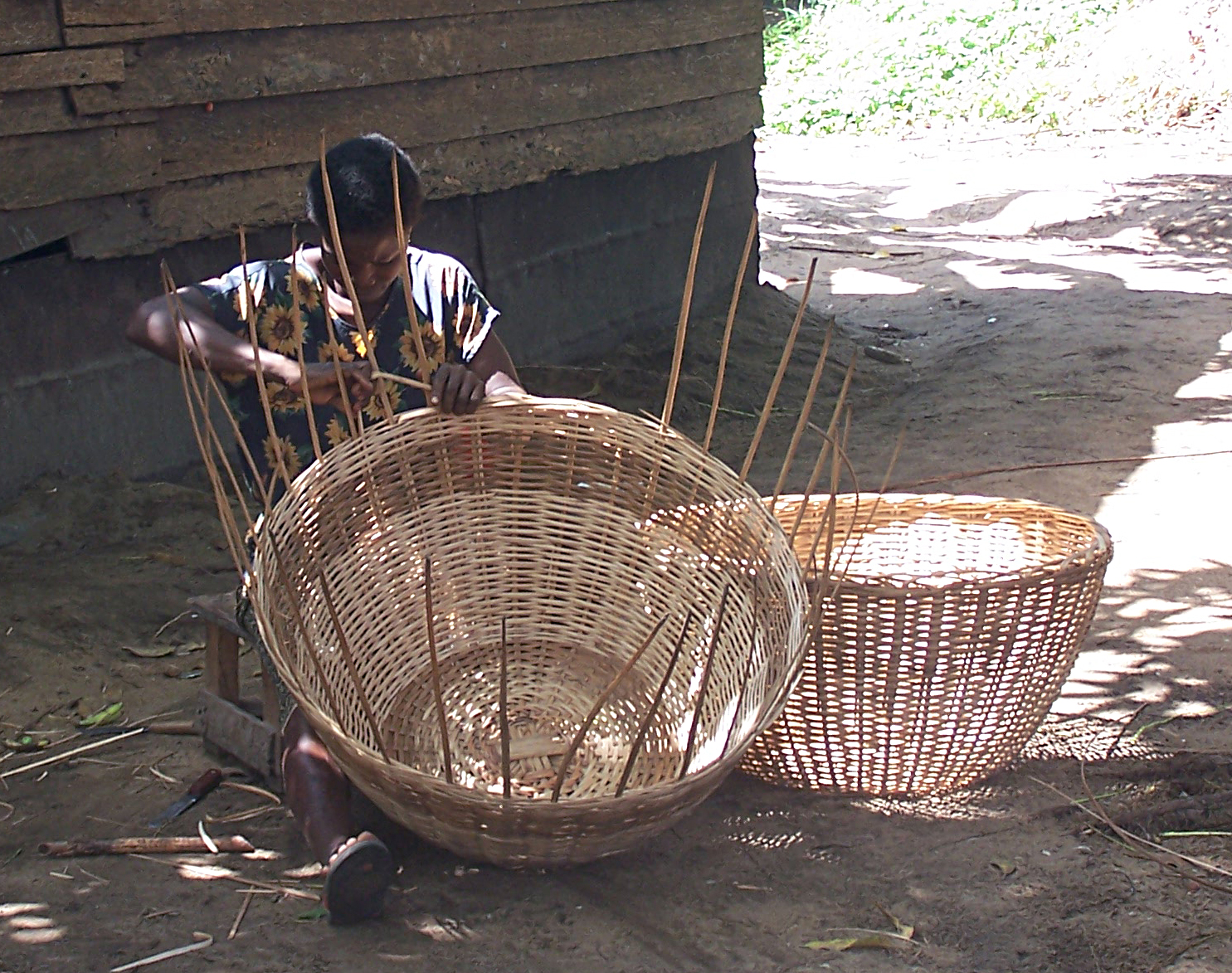
Basketweaving

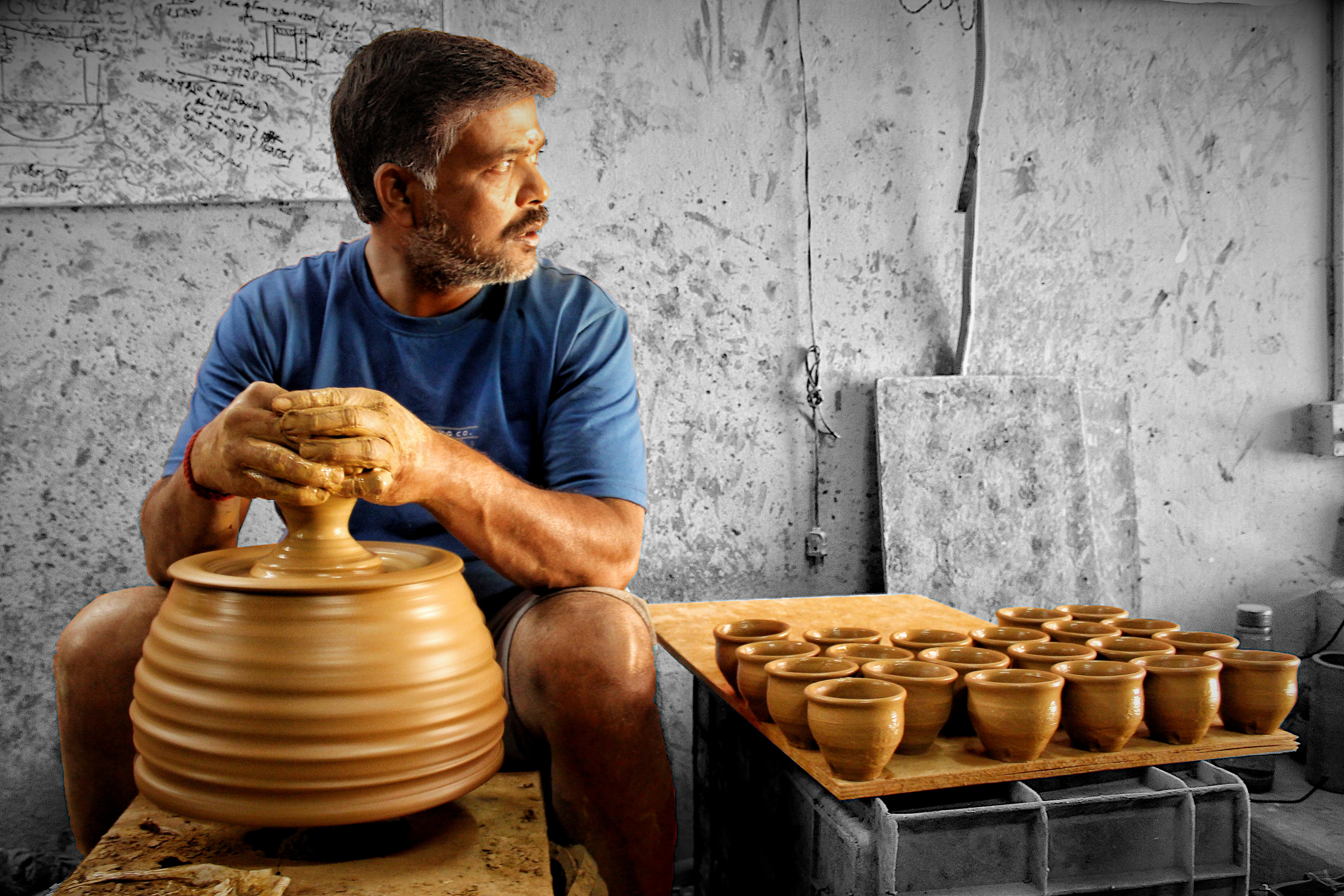
Pottery

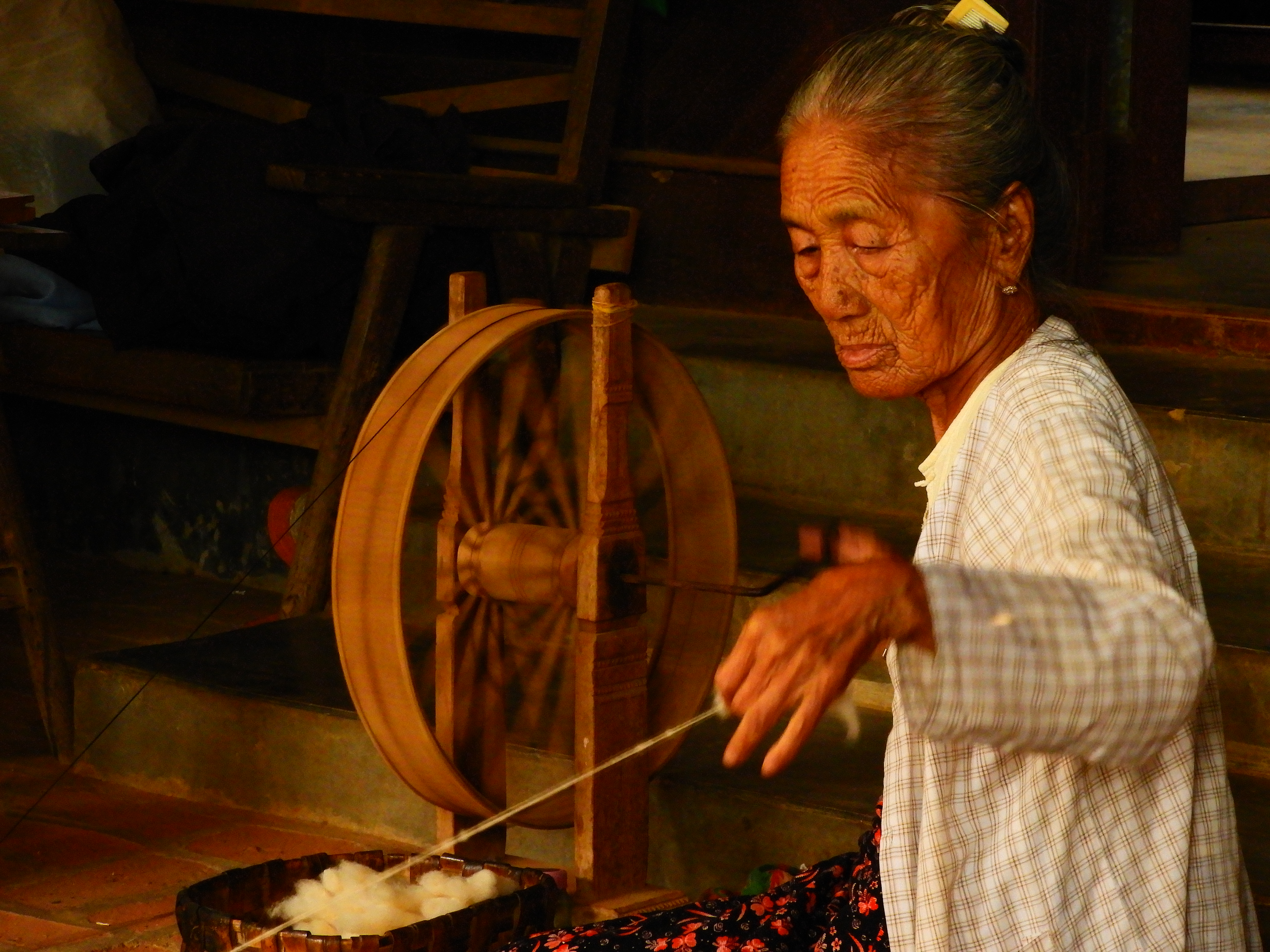
Spinning

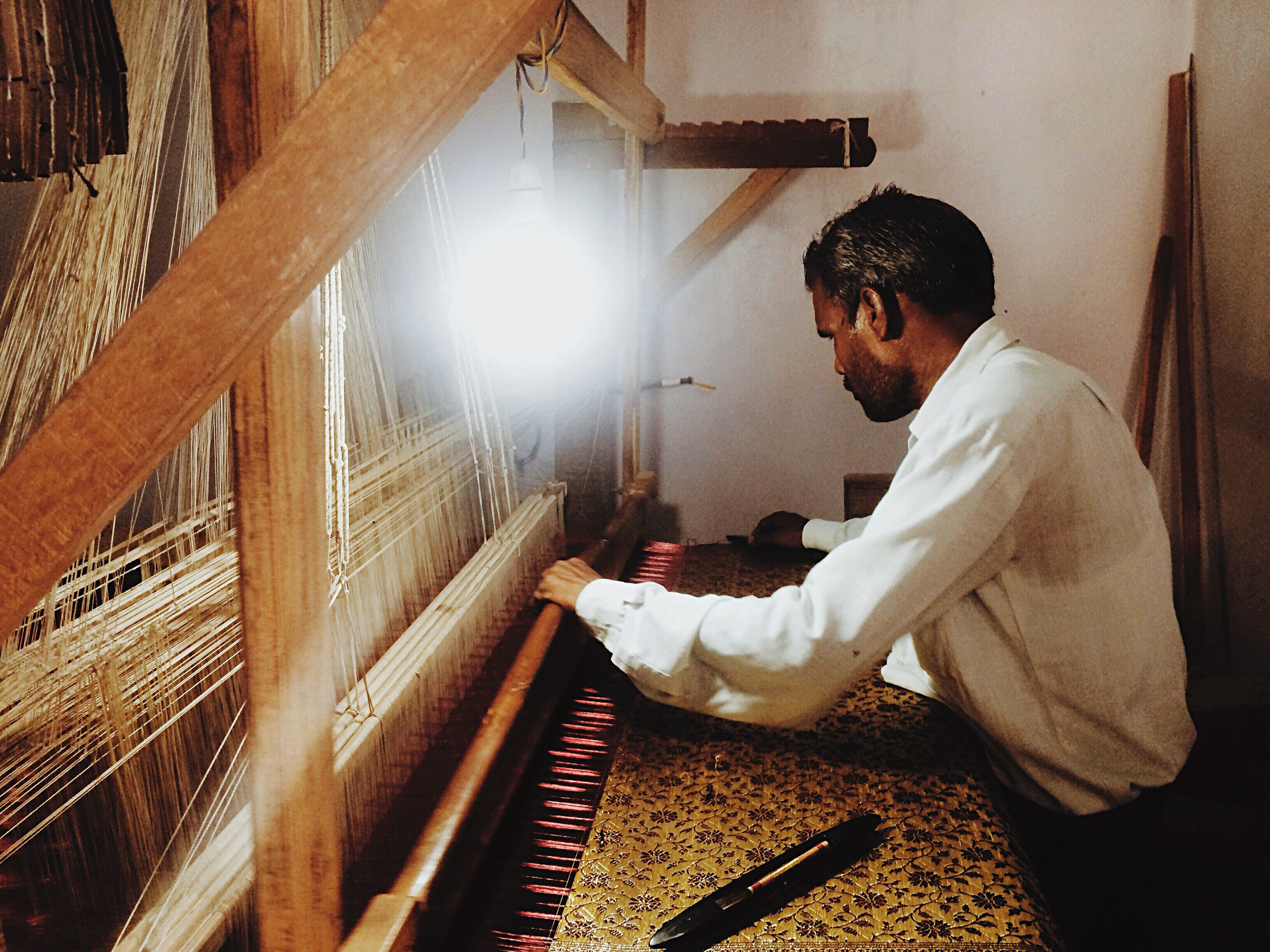
Weaving

== See also ==
- Aristaeus (ancient Greek god of rural crafts)
- Craft
