= Hurdle =

Moveable section of light fence

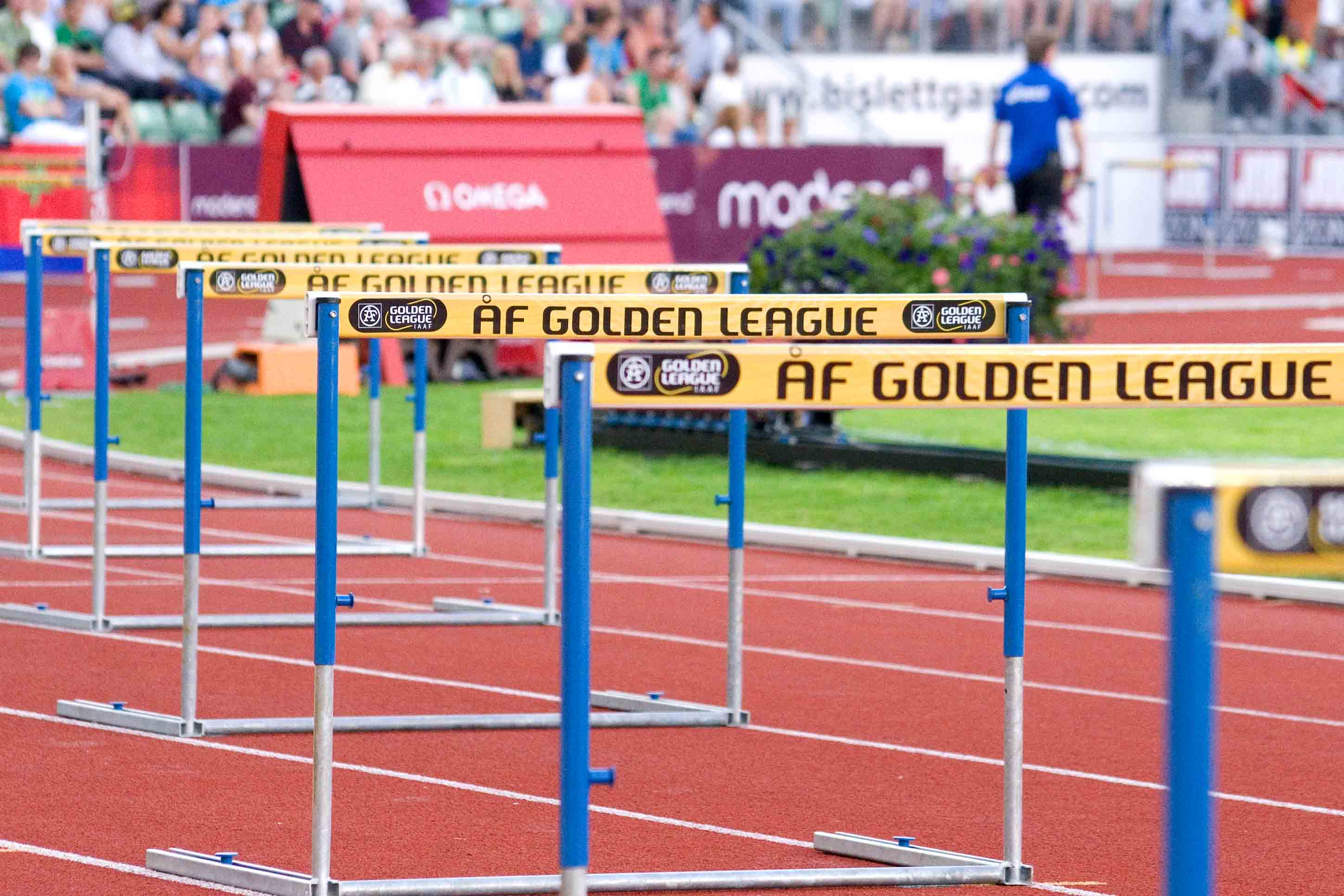
Track and field hurdles

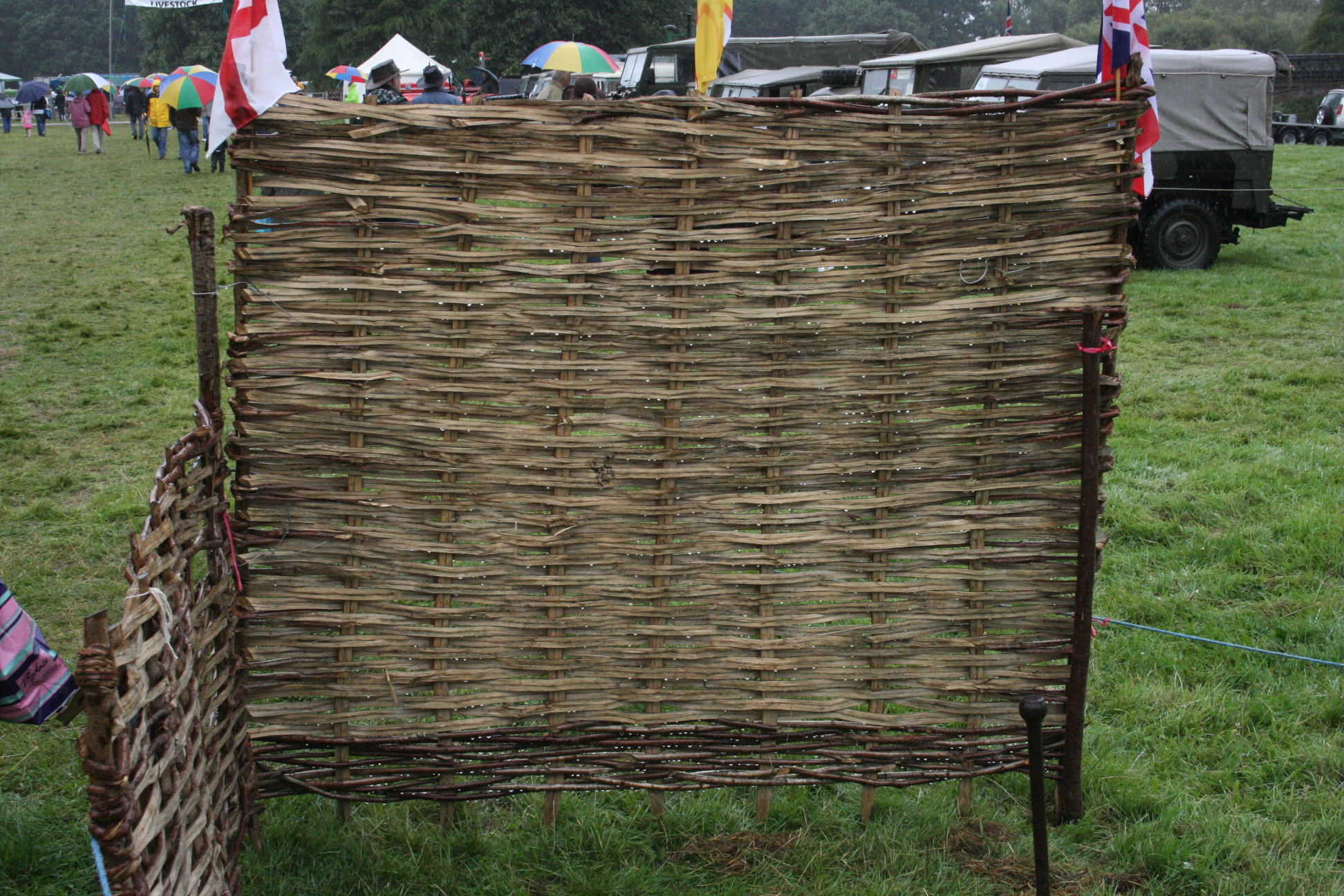
A traditional wattle hurdle

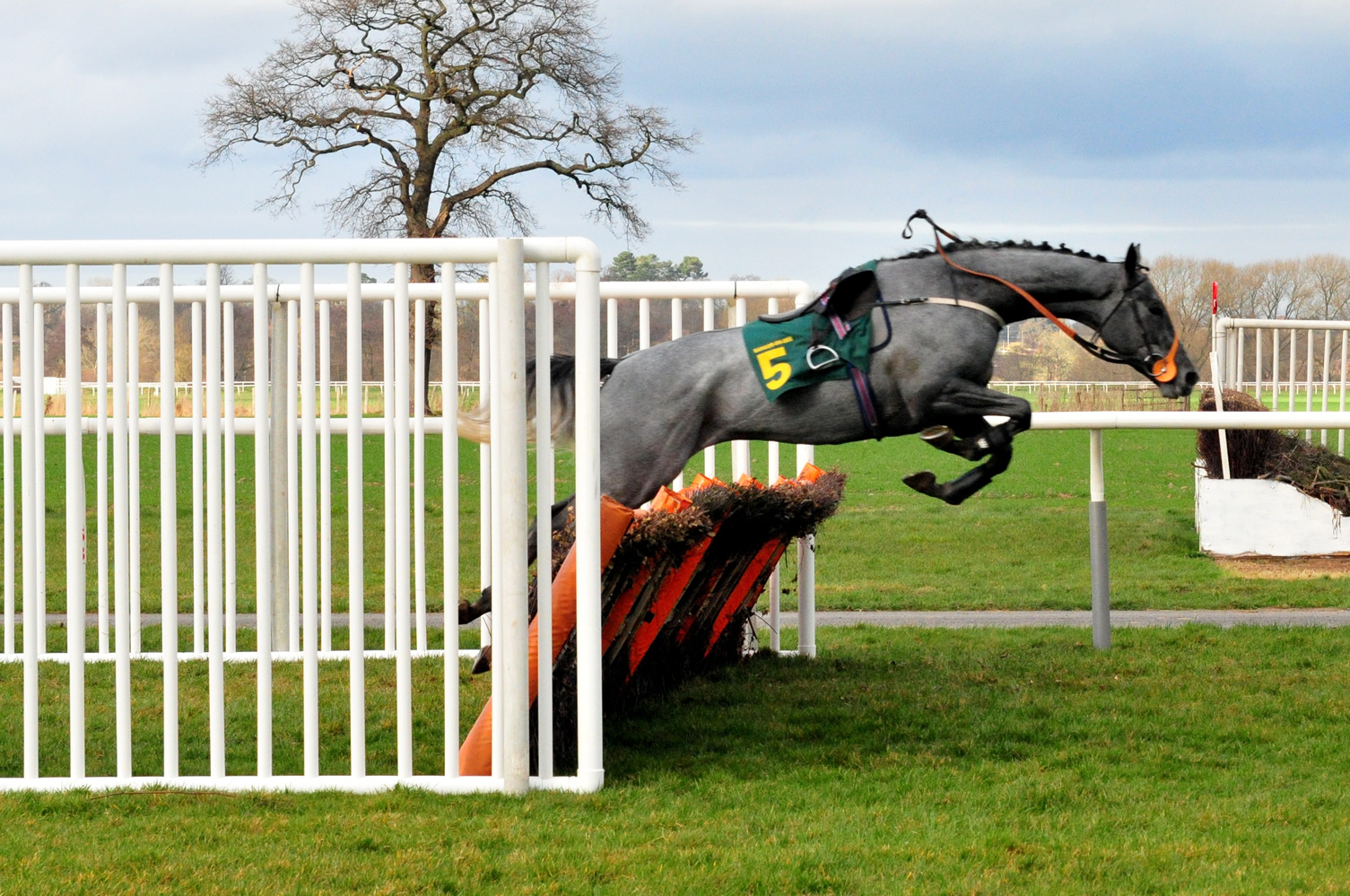
A horse free-jumping a steeplechase-type hurdle

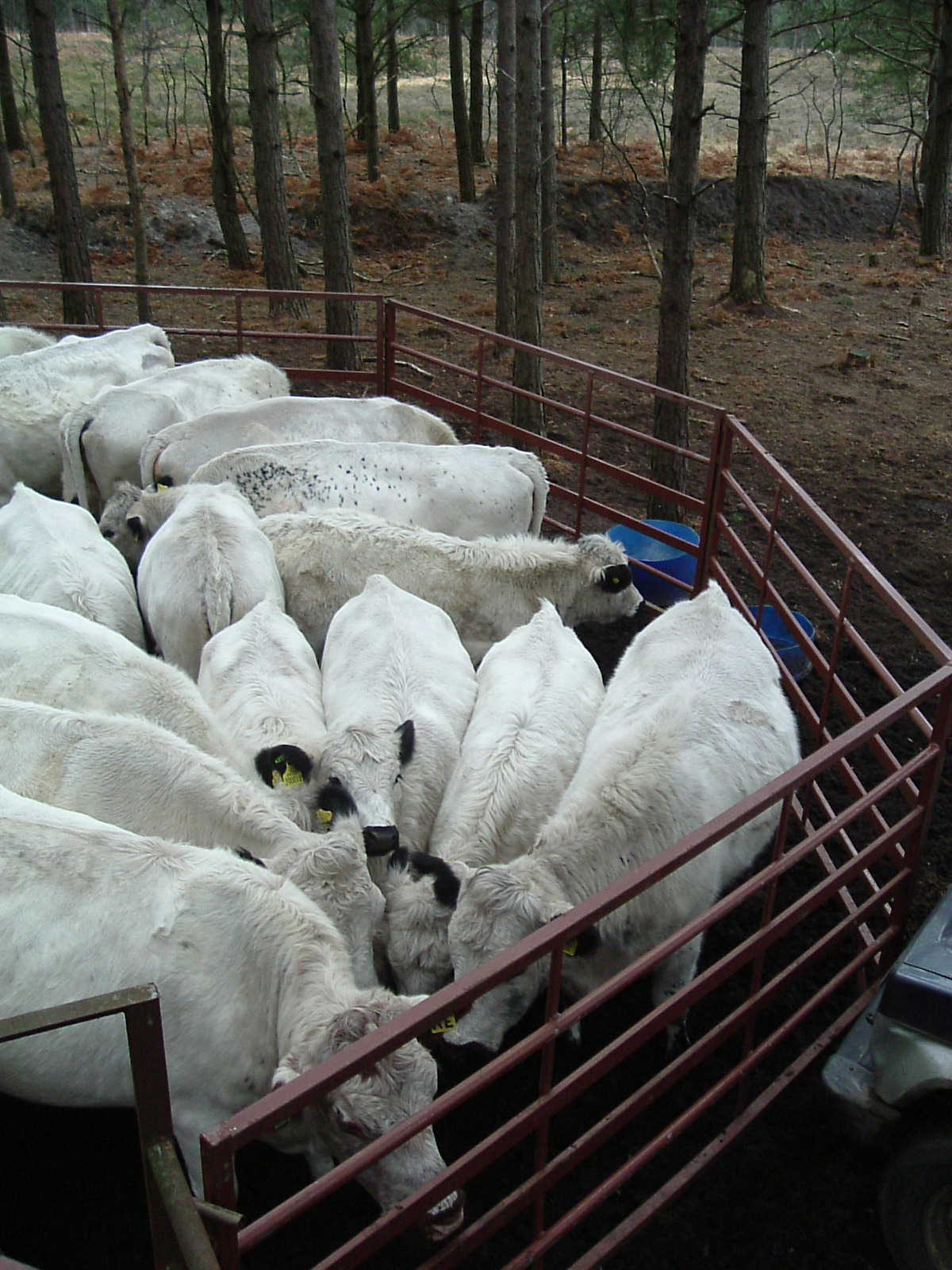
A mobile cattle pen made using steel hurdles; attached to a cattle crush in foreground

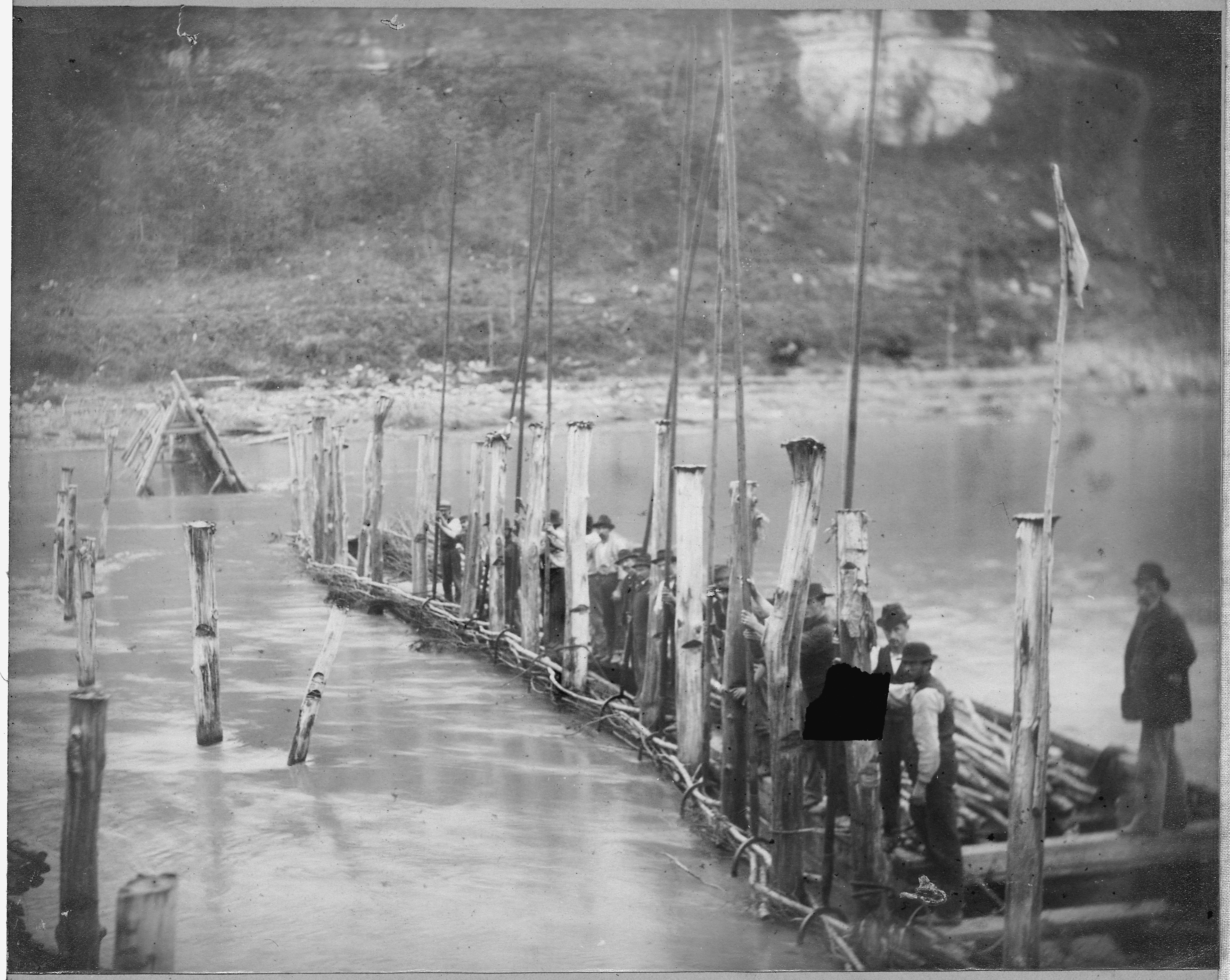
Hurdles being used to cross the Mississippi River.

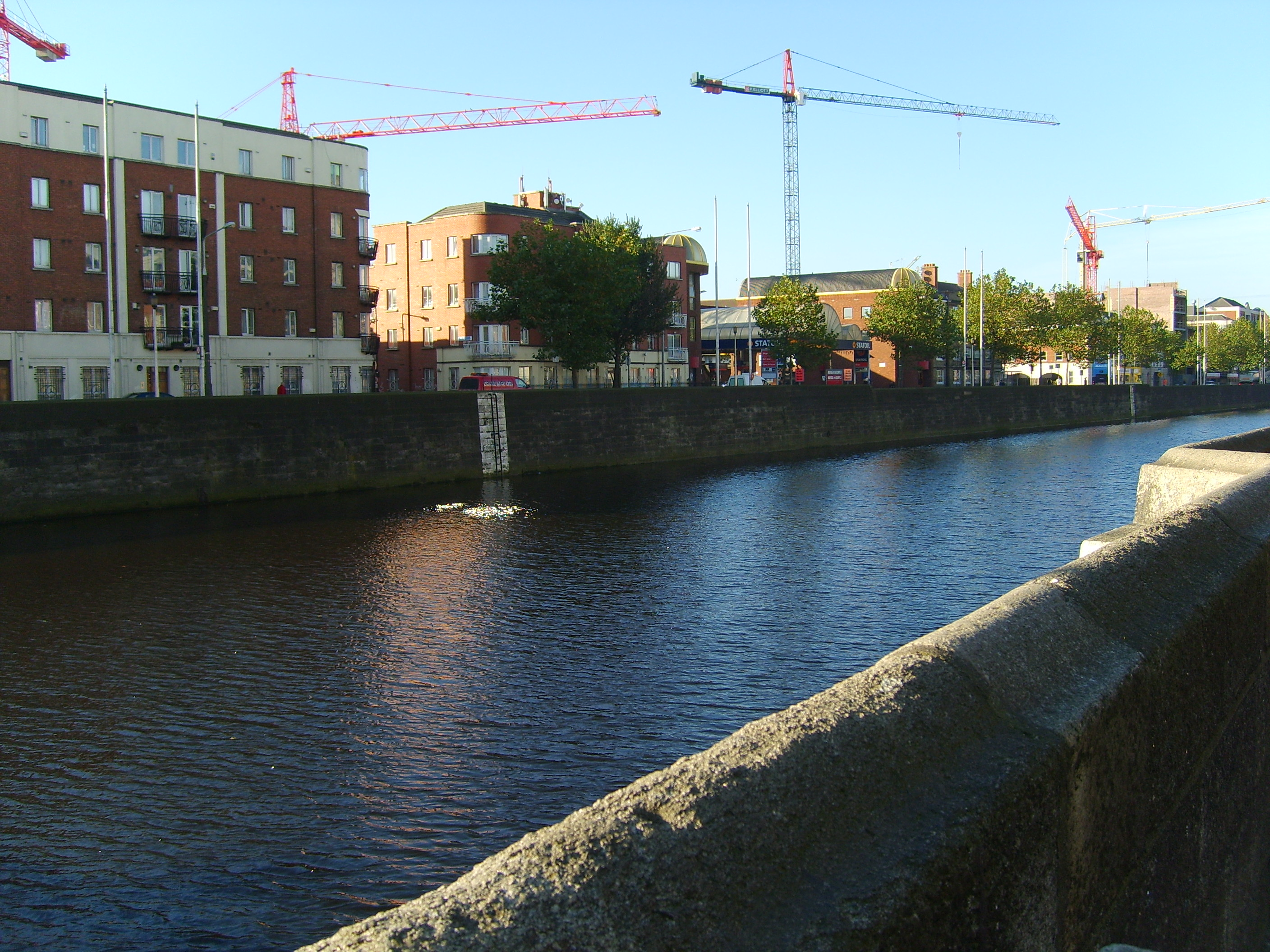
Ancient site of the "ford of hurdles", Dublin

A hurdle (UK English, limited US English) is a moveable section of light fence. In the United States, terms such as "panel", "pipe panel" or simply "fence section" are used to describe moveable sections of fencing intended for agricultural use and crowd control; "hurdle" refers primarily to fences used as jumping obstacles for steeplechasing with horses or human track and field competition.

Traditional hurdles were made from wattle, but modern designs for fencing are now frequently made of metal. They are used for handling livestock, as decorative fencing, for steeplechasing and in the track and field event of hurdling and shuttle hurdle relay.

== Types ==
Traditional hurdles are made from wattle, usually of hazel or willow. Hurdle-making is a traditional woodland craft, made by placing upright sticks in holes in a log and weaving split branches between them. Historically they were used to pen livestock or to separate land in open field systems, but they are now popular as decorative fencing for gardens. In medieval England such a hurdle was sometimes used as a makeshift sledge, to which a prisoner was tied to be dragged behind a horse to a place of execution.

Hurdles were also used for crossing rivers at fording points. Dublin's name in the Irish language, namely Baile Átha Cliath, means "town of the hurdled ford".

Modern livestock hurdles, known as panels or "pipe panels" in the USA, are used for sorting, handling or loading animals where permanent fencing is impractical or uneconomic. They are made of steel or aluminium, and vary in size. For sheep, they are usually 6 ft (1.8 m) long and 3 ft 1 in (0.94 m) high, while for cattle they are commonly 9 ft (2.7 m) or more long and 5 ft (1.5 m) high. They are usually joined by pins or hooks, both to each other and to handling facilities such as a cattle crush. While individual hurdles are easily knocked over by animals, when joined in a ring or to solid objects they make a secure fence. Single hurdles are often used as a temporary gate or to block a gap in a hedge. Hurdles are often supplied in a set together with a mobile cattle crush and a trailer for easy transport.

Wattle hurdles are also used in hedges and river restoration. They are an environmentally friendly way of adding strength to river banks to stop erosion and create a living space for wild plants and animals. Hurdles are also used to aid the growth of new hedges. They protect the young hedge plants and will slowly rot away as the hedge grows making a stronger hedge when it is time for laying a mature hedge.

Hurdles used as jumps in hunt racing are similar to traditional hurdles.

The barriers used in human track and field hurdling vary. A bar firmly attached to two posts is used for long distances, while a light metal frame on a stand is used for sprint hurdling.

== See also ==
- Wattle and daub
- National hunt racing
