= Kalpouregan =

Village Recorded in Saravan County, Iran

Coordinates: 27°13′48″N 62°32′21″E

Kalpouregan is a village in the Central District of Saravan County, Sistan and Baluchestan Province, Iran. It is located 25 kilometers southeast of Saravan and 350 kilometers south of Zahedan. The village is widely recognized for its ancient pottery-making and needlework traditions, which have been preserved for thousands of years.

== History and pottery tradition ==
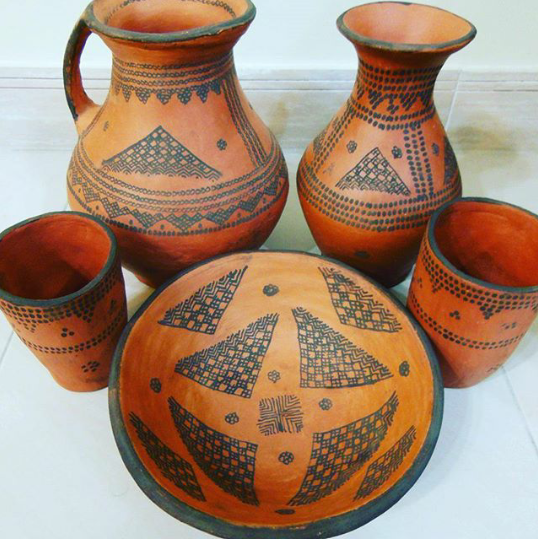
Traditional unglazed pottery from Kalpouregan village

In their book on Persian handicrafts, Jay and Sumi Gluck maintain that "Pottery first appears almost 10,000 years ago, apparently invented by women". As far as age is concerned, the pottery in Kalpouregan closely resembles wares of the fifth to third millennium B.C. excavated at numerous sites in Sistan and Baluchistan and the nearby Kerman Province. The tradition of women leading this craft continues in Kalpouregan. While women potters can still be found in various parts of the world, Gluck highlights Kalpouregan as one of the three oldest true pottery-producing regions, where Baluch women remain at the forefront of this millennia-old practice. Based on Gluck's observations, it can be reasonably argued that the methods currently used in Kalpouregan are nearly identical to those employed thousands of years ago. This ancient craft has been passed down through generations, with techniques and materials remaining largely unchanged. Kalpouregan pottery is entirely handmade, crafted using simple, locally sourced tools, and produced without the use of a potter’s wheel. It is exclusively made by Baluch women, who shape the vessels using traditional techniques and natural materials.

Similarly, the designs of Kalpouregan pottery have been passed down through generations and are deeply rooted in the village’s artistic traditions. Created from memory without predefined patterns, they help preserve Kalpouregan’s unique pottery-making heritage, which remains an integral part of the local culture.

== Characteristics of Kalpouregan pottery ==
The handcrafted pottery and all the related delicate steps are carried out exclusively by Baluch women. Men typically assist with tasks such as transporting clay from the Moshkutak Mountains, located 2 to 3 kilometers from the workshop, preparing the clay, and firing the pottery. After witnessing the entire process at site, Gluck writes:

A hard clay in rocklike clods is crushed, sieved and mixed with double the amount of a soft clay. Water is added and the clay left to stand overnight. There seems to be no washing or settling, also true of Neolithic and Chalcolithic painted wares. The woman uses a flat wooden board or a dish of about thirty-centimeter diameter as a primitive tournet. She first lays a cloth on this, adds a chunk of clay and shapes it. Smaller pieces may be rolled out of a single chunk; for larger pieces she will tamp the pot base smooth then add the wall by patting on sheets of clay. A simple wood paddle is used to pat large surfaces or scrape away excess. Some today use metal, any handy tin can lid. The pot is then separated from the cloth, turned over and scraped again, the foot scraped to make a slight concave ring between the outer edge and convex center. Left in the sun to dry – two days in summer, four in winter- it is rubbed vigorously with a wet cloth and polished with a soft stone, sovinuk. Each woman makes some forty to fifty pieces, which when dried are placed in huts covered with woven mats of dwarf fan palm to avoid excess drying."

— Gluck

The patterns and motifs of Kalpouregan pottery are entirely geometric, inspired by prehistoric designs. These decorations feature abstract symbols that have been passed down through generations, reflecting the spiritual and cultural beliefs of the artisans. Many motifs resemble prehistoric and early historical pottery designs, demonstrating a deep connection to ancient artistic traditions.

Unlike modern pottery, Kalpouregan pottery is unglazed. Instead, artisans use Tituk stone for decoration and painting. This manganese-based stone, found in the nearby Tappeh Achar, produces a brown or black color, giving Kalpouregan pottery its distinctive appearance.

Another unique feature of Kalpouregan pottery is the durability of its handles. Unlike modern pottery, where handles are often fragile, those on Kalpouregan pottery are sturdier and tend to break later than other parts of the piece.

== Kalpouregan Living Pottery Museum ==
The Kalpouregan Living Pottery Museum is regarded as the only living pottery museum in the world, showcasing an ancient tradition that continues to thrive in the modern era. The museum highlights the unique methods used by local artisans, drawing global attention to its historical and cultural significance.

In 2017, Kalpouregan was recognized by the World Crafts Council (WCC) as a "living museum of pottery," a designation that acknowledges the village’s role in preserving traditional pottery-making techniques. This recognition has contributed to raising international awareness of the village’s unique pottery traditions, ensuring the continuation of its cultural heritage.
