= Screw pine craft of Kerala =

Traditional craft with screw pine in Kerala

Logo of "Screw pine craft of Kerala" as in Geographical Indications Registry

Screw pine craft of Kerala is the craft of making different types of mats and wall hangings using the leaves of the screw pine plant as practised by artisans in Kerala. As per an application filed by Development Commissioner (Handicrafts), Ministry of Textiles, Government of India, "Screw pine craft of Kerala" has been granted Registration in Part A in respect of Mats, Door Mats, Wall Hangings, Bed Mats, Prayer Mats falling in Class – 27 under Sub-section (1) of Section 13 of Geographical Indications of Goods (Registration and Protection) Act, 1999 with effect from 30 November 2015.

== Production ==
The craft uses the leaves of the screw pine (Pandanus), a shrub that grows wild along the rivers, canals, ponds and backwaters of Kerala and is also planted as a natural fence. The plant is called thazha or kaitha in Malayalam, and a woven screw pine mat is known as thazhappaya.

Only mature leaves are cut from the plant. Their thorny edges are trimmed off, and each leaf is split lengthwise into thin strips. The strips are boiled and washed to lighten them, soaked in fresh water, and then dried in the sun until they turn a pale ivory colour. They are straightened with a knife, rolled into bundles, and some are dyed before weaving. The mat is woven by hand, a weft strip passing diagonally between two warp strips. Fineness is measured by the number of strips across a given width; ordinary mats have about 8 to 10 splints per inch, while the finest run to about 22. Two-ply sleeping mats have a fine upper layer over a coarser base, with the edges stitched.

Besides floor mats, prayer mats and bed mats, artisans make table mats, coasters, cushion covers, bags, boxes, hats and wall hangings, some finished with embroidery.

== Economy and culture ==
Weaving is done in several districts, with Vaikom in Kottayam district and parts of Kollam district among the main centres. A common facility centre runs at Thalayolaparambu, where a women's handicraft co-operative society is based, and the Vaikom area alone has more than 500 artisans.

Weaving of mats using leaves of the screw pine plants is a craft practiced mostly by women in Kerala. This craft, which is practised by artisans in all the districts of Kerala, has been in existence as long ago as 800 years. The mats produced by screw pine has a significant role in the traditional customs of Kerala. Important visitors to homes were offered these mats as honoured articles to be sat upon. Finer varieties of these mats were also used as bed for sleeping.
