= Brass broidered coconut shell craft of Kerala =

Craft of Kerala

Logo of "Brass broidered coconut shell craft of Kerala" as in Geographical Indications Registry

Brass broidered coconut shell craft of Kerala is the craft of making beautifully carved and brass embroidered products like cups, flower vases, snuff boxes, nut bowls, powder boxes and spoons using coconut shells as practiced by the artisans of Kerala in India. This art requires great skill on the part of the artisan as the shell is extremely hard. The main centres of production in Kerala are located in Thiruvananthapuram and Kozhikode Districts. Though the coconut shell craft is also prevalent in Goa, Tamil Nadu, Pondicherry, Andaman and Nicobar Islands and West Bengal, the brass embroidered variety is practiced only in Kerala.

Coconut shell craft is also practiced in many countries around the world such as Cambodia, Thailand, Philippines, Maldives and Sri Lanka.

As per an application filed by Development Commissioner (Handicrafts), Ministry of Textiles, Government of India, "Brass broidered coconut shell craft of Kerala" has been granted Registration in Part A in respect of Articles made of coconut shell falling in Class – 20 under Sub-section (1) of Section 13 of Geographical Indications of Goods (Registration and Protection) Act, 1999 with effect from 30 November 2015.
