= Parchment craft =

Art of embellishing and decorating parchment paper

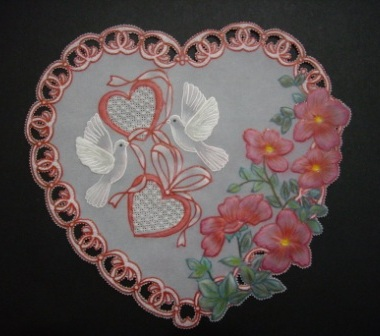
Example of parchment craft

Parchment craft, also known as Pergamano, is the art of embellishing and decorating parchment paper (or vellum paper) through the use of techniques such as embossing, perforating, stippling, cutting and coloring.

Parchment craft has been predominantly used in the making of cards (religious devotional cards, greeting cards and gift cards) but the techniques are being applied to related items such as bookmarks and picture frames as well as three-dimensional sculptural paper projects such as ornaments and boxes.

== History ==
Historians believe that parchment craft originated as an art form in Europe during the 15th or 16th century. Parchment craft at that time occurred principally in Catholic communities, where crafts people created lace-like items such as devotional pictures and communion cards. The craft developed over time, with new techniques and refinements being added. Until the 16th century, parchment craft was a European art form. However, missionaries and other settlers relocated to South America, taking parchment craft with them. As before, the craft appeared largely among the Catholic communities. Often, young girls receiving their First Communion received gifts of handmade parchment crafts.

Although the invention of the printing press led to a reduced interest in hand made cards and items, by the 18th century, people were regaining interest in detailed handwork. Parchment cards became larger in size and crafters began adding wavy borders and perforations. In the 19th century, influenced by French romanticism, parchment crafters began adding floral themes and cherubs and hand embossing.

== Tools ==
There are many tools involved in parchment craft; each has its specific purpose and use.

=== Mapping pen ===
Designs are traced onto parchment using a mapping pen and acrylic ink (usually white, but various colors are used to accent purposes). A mapping pen uses a nib which is dipped in ink.

=== White pencil ===
Designs can also be traced onto the parchment using a white pencil. This technique is usually used for very fine lines that will be directly traced over during the embossing process. The white pencil is used in this case because if one was to trace directly over an inked line, it would become black.

=== Embossing tools ===
Embossing tools come in many sizes. The larger the tool the softer the embossing and the "greyer" the color of the embossed shape; the smaller the tool the "whiter" and more "satiny" the color of the embossed shape. The tips of these tools also are made with different materials, some plastic – for lighter embossing – and some steel – for the brighter whites. The tools range from "large ball" to "extra fine ball" and a "stylus" (for very fine lines and intricate details).

=== Needle tools ===
Needle tools are sometimes used for embossing details, but mostly are used for perforating to make decorative, lace-like patterns. Needle tools have either single or multiple points and are used for different purposes. A single needle tool is used for embossing or stippling. A 2 needle tool is used for even perforations for marking areas which are to be cut with scissors. A 4 needle tool is square-shaped and a necessity for classic lace patterns. 3,5,7 and half-circle needle tools are used for decorative additions to lace patterns. A scissors is used in combination with needle tools to cut crosses and slots into the patterning.

=== Embossing and perforating pads ===
These pads are to be used as support whenever pressure is placed upon the parchment. For embossing a soft pad is required to provide even support. For perforating a felt pad is used.

=== Coloring tools ===
To color parchment craft work many media can be used such as:

- Inks-any waterproof or acrylic ink
- Acrylic paints
- Oil pastels
- Watercolor pencils
- Felt-tip pens or markers
- Blendable pencils are probably the most commonly used form of colouring.

== Techniques ==
=== Tracing ===
This is the first step in any parchment craft project. Tracing creates the guidelines for the areas of the design that are to be embossed. Tracing is done using the mapping pen and ink. Parchment has two sides-one with a smooth surface and one with a rough surface; tracing is done on the side with the rough surface because the ink more easily adheres to this type of surface. When tracing the mapping pen should be allowed to glide easily over the parchment, no pressure should be used as this increases the amount of ink that is dispersed from the nib and may also create an unintentional embossment.

=== Embossing ===
Embossing is the process of creating raised relief within one's design. Embossing is used to create both concave and convex shapes by alternating the side on which the embossing is performed. Using the embossing tools and appropriate embossing pad, the parchment is rubbed backwards and forwards or side to side in parallel movements with increasing downward pressure so that the parchment can be evenly stretched. A finished embossment will be satin-white in color and will contrast with the translucency of the parchment paper. Color can be varied by moderating the level to which the shape is embossed. Fine lines and hatching can be obtained by embossing with the stylus tool.

=== Stippling ===
The single needle tool is used for stippling. Stippling is a technique used for generating a matte white surface to areas or for fine detail work such as the centers of flowers. To create a matte white surface the parchment is first lightly embossed and then small holes are perforated on the parchment in very close proximity. The perforation is done using a cardboard pad rather than a felt pad so that the needle will not pierce through the parchment, but rather create an embossed dot.

=== Perforating ===
Perforating is used to create decorative and special lace patterns in parchment craft. Minimal tracing is required when perforating; designs are usually created by taping the parchment over a pattern and perforating directly over it. Various needle tools are used in the perforating technique. Perforating is also used to create edging and borders or to denote guidelines for cutting.

=== Cutting ===
Cutting is used in combination with perforating. Cutting is used with the 2 needle tool to remove shapes from the design; it is used with the 4 needle tool to create crosses and strips within a lace pattern.

=== Coloring ===
Coloring is a technique that gained popularity in parchment craft in the 20th century; before this, parchment craft was originally only white work. There are many methods for coloring parchment craft work. One of the most popular is "dorsing". Dorsing creates a soft background color for embossed shapes or the areas around them. Color is applied in the dorsing process using oil pastels or Dorso crayons which are rubbed on and then blended using paper toweling and odorless mineral spirits or an oil based medium such as linseed or lavender oil. For coloring that is applied to the parchment in entirety, the coloring is done before any tracing or embossing. If color is to be added to small areas, dorsing would be applied in a similar manner to specific areas before the embossing process. Dorsing can also be done using other coloring media such as felt-tip pens/markers, watercolor pencils, acrylic paints or inks.
