= Iris folding =

Birthday card made with iris folding

Iris folding is a paper craft technique that involves folding strips of colored paper in such a way to form a design. The center of the design forms an iris—a shape reminiscent of the iris diaphragm of a camera lens.

== History ==
Iris folding originated in 20th-century Holland, where early craft people made their designs using patterned paper cut from the inside of envelopes.

== Techniques ==
Iris folding is done with a pattern. The crafter uses the finished product to decorate the front of a greeting card, as a scrapbook embellishment, to decor a pattern, strips of colored paper, permanent transparent tape, cutting tools and a temporary tape such as painters tape. The temporary tape is used to hold the pattern in place while the craftsperson creates the design.

Iris folding patterns are available from booksellers or as downloadable files made available on Internet web sites. Other craft persons doing iris folding create their own patterns.

== External sources ==
- Iris Folding @ Circle of Crafters Explanation of iris folding, free patterns, techniques, pictures and a member forum.
- Video Demonstration of Iris Folding Discussion of iris folding and video demonstration showing how to do this paper craft technique
