= Cross stitches =

X or + shaped embroidery stitch

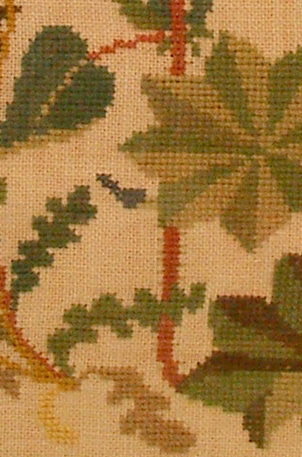
Detail of cross stitch embroidery from Sweden.

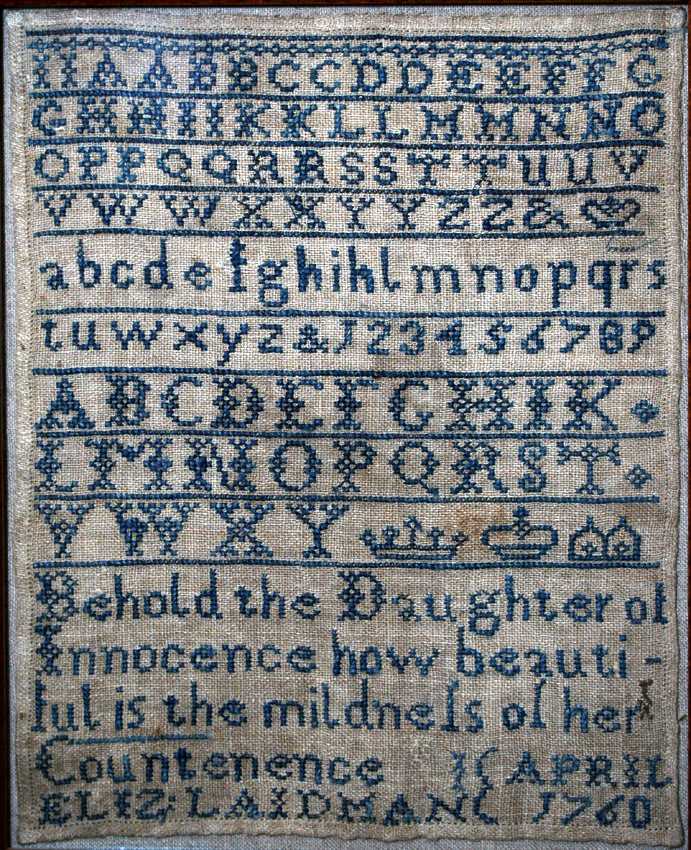
Cross stitch sampler with alphabets, crowns, and coronets, 1760

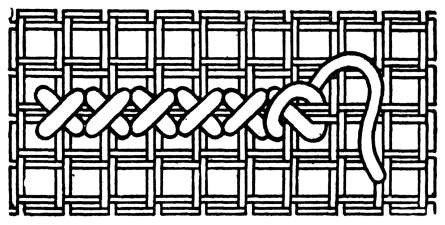
Cross stitch in canvas work

Cross stitches in embroidery, needlepoint, and other forms of needlework include a number of related stitches in which the thread is sewn in an x or + shape. Cross stitch has been called "probably the most widely used stitch of all" and is part of the needlework traditions of the Balkans, Middle East, Afghanistan, Colonial America and Victorian England.

== Applications ==
Cross stitches were typical of 16th century canvas work, falling out of fashion in favor of tent stitch toward the end of the century. Canvas work in cross stitch became popular again in the mid-19th century with the Berlin wool work craze.

Herringbone, fishbone, Van Dyke, and related crossed stitches are used in crewel embroidery, especially to add texture to stems, leaves, and similar objects. Basic cross stitch is used to fill backgrounds in Assisi work.

Cross stitch was widely used to mark household linens in the 18th and 19th centuries, and girls' skills in this essential task were demonstrated with elaborate samplers embroidered with cross-stitched alphabets, numbers, birds and other animals, and the crowns and coronets sewn onto the linens of the nobility. Much of contemporary cross-stitch embroidery derives from this tradition.

== Variants ==
Common variants of cross stitch include:

- Basic cross stitch
- Celtic cross stitch
- Long-armed cross stitch
- Double cross stitch
- Italian cross stitch
- Basket stitch
- Leaf stitch
- Herringbone stitch
- Closed herringbone stitch
- Tacked herringbone stitch
- Threaded herringbone stitch
- Tied herringbone stitch
- Montenegrin stitch
- Trellis stitch
- Thorn stitch
- Van Dyke stitch

The most famous are Italian cross embroidery, long arm cross embroidery, and Black Mountain embroidery. Italian cross embroidery and Montenegrin embroidery are reversible, which means that the work looks the same on both sides. These styles are a little different from regular cross stitch embroidery. These more intricate stitches are rarely used in traditional embroidery, but they are still used to recreate historical works of embroidery or by creative and adventurous embroiderers. Double cross embroidery, also known as Leviathan embroidery or Smyrna cross embroidery, combines cross embroidery vertically.

Berlin Woolwork and similar stitches like petit point are reminiscent of the heavily brushed, luxurious styles of cross-stitch embroidery, and sometimes paper-printed diagrams are also used.

=== Gallery ===
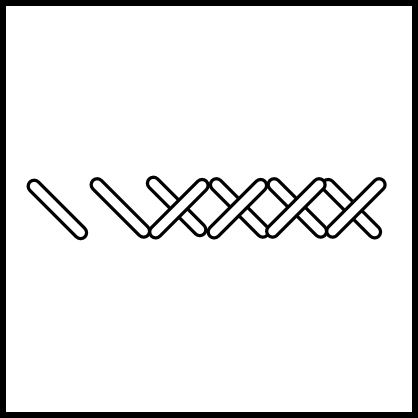
Basic cross stitch as worked in embroidery

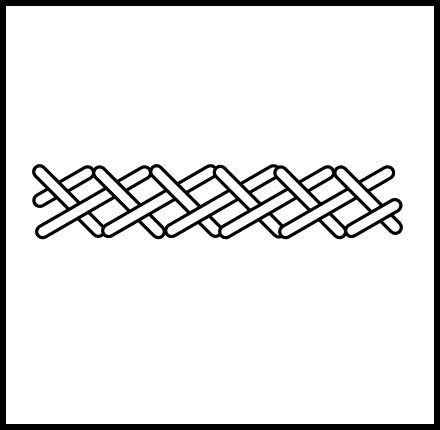
Long-armed cross stitch

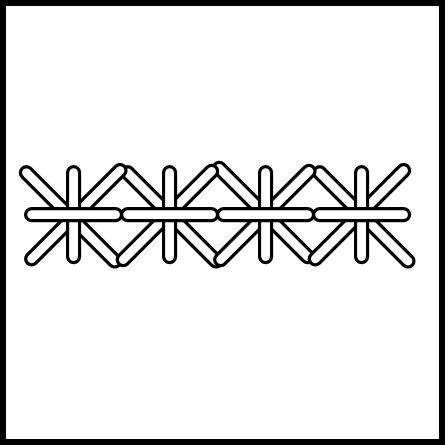
Double cross stitch

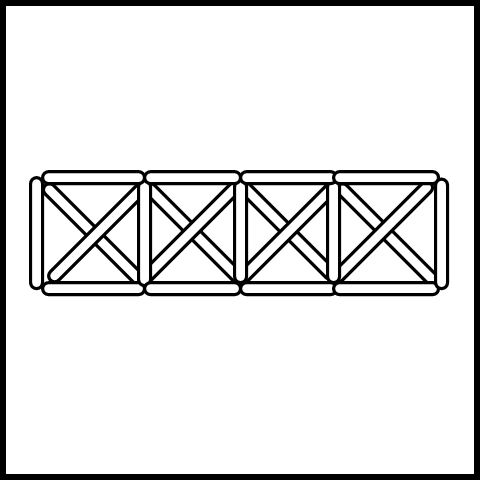
Italian cross stitch

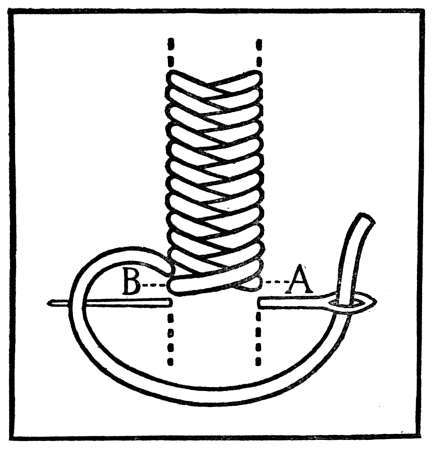
Basket stitch

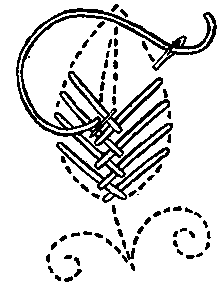
Leaf stitch

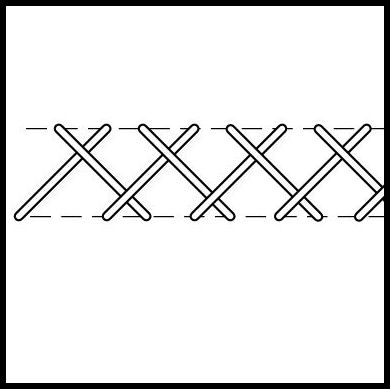
Herringbone stitch

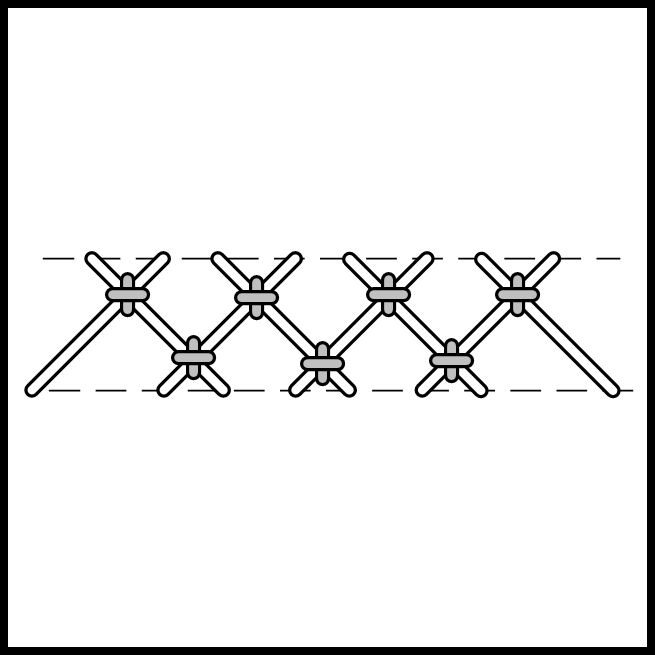
Tacked herringbone stitch

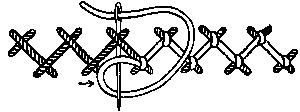
Tied herringbone stitch

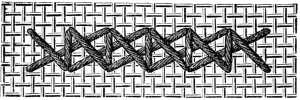
Montenegrin stitch

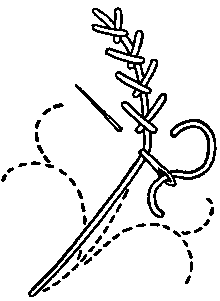
Thorn stitch

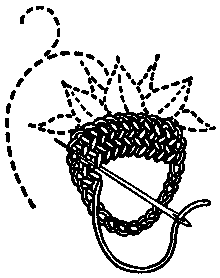
Trellis stitch

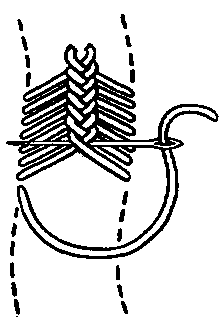
Van Dyke stitch

== See also ==
- Cross-stitch
- Embroidery stitch
