= Bahouth =

Bahouth is a surname. Notable people with the surname include:

- Candace Bahouth, American-born artist
- Clement Bahouth, patriarch of the Melkite Catholic Church
