= Mosaic stitch =

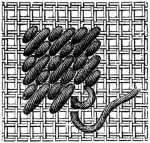
Mosaic stitch.

Mosaic stitch is a simple diagonal stitch used in needlepoint.

It is built up of blocks of three diagonal stitches, each of two short stitches flanking one long one: on embroidery canvas each block crosses two horizontal and two vertical threads. It is similar to Scotch stitch (also called cushion stitch), but is worked less densely and has only three diagonals per block rather than five. In Reversed Mosaic stitch, alternate cells run in opposite diagonals to form a chequerboard effect.

The diagonal direction distinguishes it from Hungarian stitch, which is also worked in blocks of two short stitches flanking a long one, but vertically.
