= Parisian stitch =

Embroidery stitch used in needlepoint and canvas work

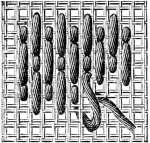
Parisian stitch.

Parisian stitch is a longer horizontal/vertical stitch used in needlepoint next to a smaller parallel stitch to create a basketweave pattern. The end points on either end alternate in a staggered pattern.

According to Thérèse de Dilmont in the Encyclopedia of Needlework:

This stitch, though it is generally worked on silk canvas, can also be worked on the different cotton and linen materials already referred to more than once in this Encyclopedia. It makes a very good grounding in cases where the material is not intended to be completely hidden. It consists of a long stitch over three threads, and a short stitch over one thread, alternately.

The case holding this thread is commonly known as an etu and is derived from the French word meaning fabric case.
