= Berlin wool work =

Embroidery technique using worsted yarns

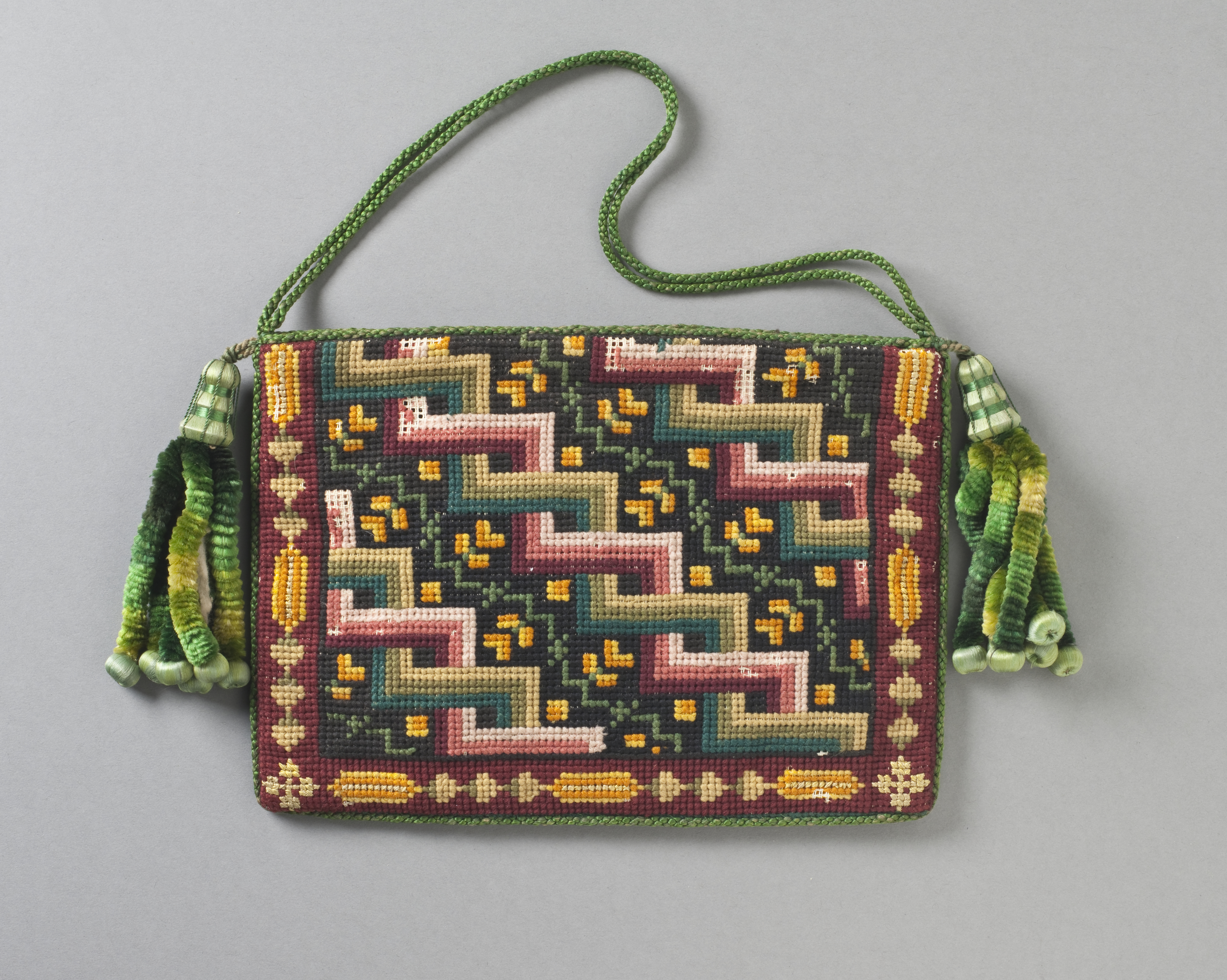
- Woman's purse, Berlin wool work, Europe, cotton canvas with wool needlepoint, silk-braided cord, and silk chenille tassels, c. 1840, Los Angeles County Museum of Art, M.2007.211.280.
- Type: Style of embroidery
- Material: Wool yarn on canvas
- Place of origin: Berlin, Germany

Berlin wool work is a style of embroidery similar to today's needlepoint that was particularly popular in Europe and America from 1804 to 1875. It is typically executed with wool yarn on canvas, worked in a single stitch such as cross stitch or tent stitch, although Beeton's book of Needlework (1870) describes 15 different stitches for use in Berlin work. It was traditionally stitched in many colours and hues, producing intricate three-dimensional looks by careful shading. Silk or beads were frequently used as highlights. The design of such embroidery was made possible by the great progress made in dyeing, initially with new mordants and chemical dyes, followed in 1856, especially by the discovery of aniline dyes, which produced bright colors.

Berlin work creates very durable and long-lived pieces of embroidery that can be used as furniture covers, cushions, bags, or even clothing.

== History ==
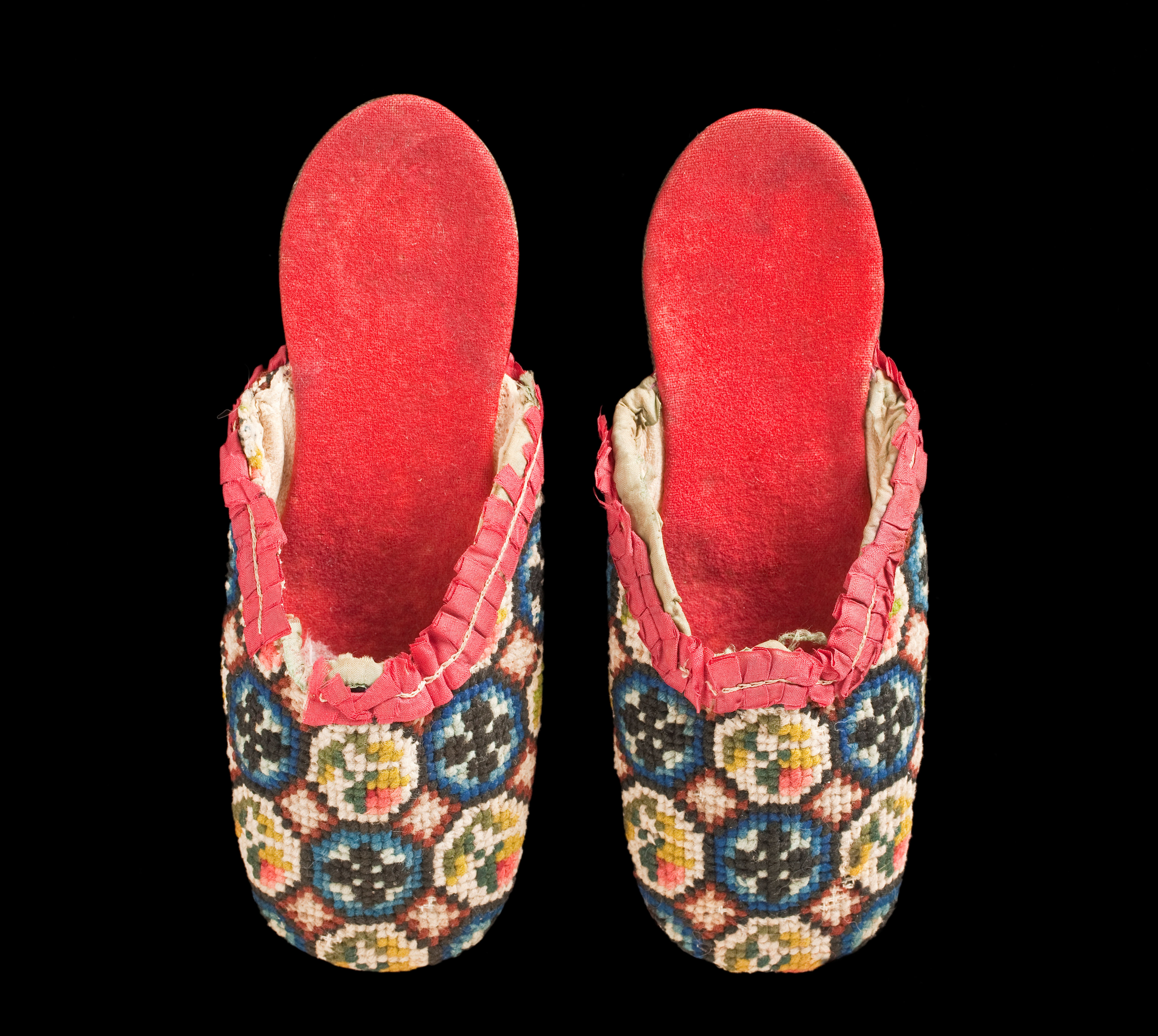
Boy's slippers, Berlin wool work, 1800–1850, Los Angeles County Museum of Art, M.2007.211.309a-b.

Berlin wool work patterns were first published in Berlin, Germany, early in the 19th century. The first Berlin wool patterns were printed in black and white on grid paper and then hand-coloured. Previously, the stitcher was expected to draw the outlines on the canvas and then stitch following the colours on the pattern. Counted stitch patterns on charted paper, similar to modern cross-stitch patterns, made it easier to execute the designs, because amateur embroiderers were able to follow the patterns using just a simple tent stitch. They were published mostly as single sheets which made them affordable to middle-class women.

Soon they were exported to Britain and the United States. The patterns were used sparsely in the United States until the 1840s, when they started to appear in women's magazines, after which "Berlin work" became all the rage. Indeed, Berlin work became practically synonymous with canvas work.

In Britain, Berlin work received a further boost through the Great Exhibition of 1851, and by the advent of ladies' magazines such as The Englishwoman's Domestic Magazine.

The popularity of Berlin work was due largely to the fact that, for the first time in history, a fairly large number of women had leisure time to devote to needlework.

Designs started to be published in Vienna and Paris as well, and included geometric, floral, and pictorial scenes, before sentimental Victorian tastes impacted the patterns. Subjects to be embroidered were influenced by Victorian Romanticism and included floral designs, Victorian paintings, biblical or allegorical motifs, and animals. Berlin work patterns could be applied to various kinds of clothing and home furnishings or could be made as stand-alone artworks, in the style of needle paintings, which are works that copy well-known master paintings in thread.

In the late 1880s, the demand for Berlin wool work decreased dramatically, largely because the tastes had changed, but also because Berlin work publishers failed to accommodate new tastes. Other, less opulent styles of embroidery became more popular, such as the art needlework advocated by William Morris and his Arts and Crafts movement. Yet the wide distribution of Berlin work patterns had made needlework available to a large number of women, and it also caused them to become interested in other types of needlework.

== Motifs ==
Biblical quotations or other allegorical messages espousing Christian values and ideals were often incorporated into Berlin work designs; "God Bless Our Home", "Forget Me Not", "Remember Me", "Look to Jesus", and so on. Other popular motifs included children, pets lying on cushions, forest scenes, and hunting. In the United States, flowers were the most popular design.

== Today ==
Original charted Berlin wool work patterns remain available in a number of books. Berlin wool work designs are still popular in trammed needlepoint canvases, printed canvas needlepoint kits and can be found as digitized charts on needlework enthusiasts' websites.

== General and cited references ==
- Desnoyers, Rosika. Pictorial Embroidery in England: A Critical History of Needlepainting and Berlin Work. London: Bloomsbury, 2019.
- Edwards, Joan. Berlin Work. Dorking, England: Bayford Books, 1980.
- Levey, Santina M. Discovering Embroidery of the 19th Century. England: Shire Publications, Ltd., 1977.
- Markrich, Lilo, and Heinz Edgar Kiewe. Victorian Fancywork: Nineteenth-Century Needlepoint Patterns and Designs. Chicago: Regnery, 1974.
- Procter, Molly G. Victorian Canvas Work: Berlin Wool Work. B. T. Batsford Ltd, 1986.
- Serena, Raffaella. Animal Embroideries & Patterns: From 19th Century Vienna. Antique Collectors Club Dist, 2006.
- Serena, Raffaella. Berlin Work, Samplers & Embroidery of the Nineteenth Century. Lacis, 1996.
- Serena, Raffaella. Embroideries & Patterns from 19th Century Vienna. Antique Collectors Club Dist, 2006.
- Stepanova, Irina. "Berlin Work: An Exuberance of Color". PieceWork magazine, March–April, 2011, pp. 41–46.
- Stepanova, Irina. "Berlin Wool: Fine Fiber from an Innovative Age". PieceWork magazine, November–December, 2011, pp. 12–17.
