= Smyrna stitch =

Form of cross stitch used in needlepoint

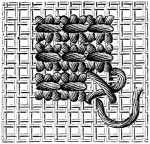
Smyrna stitch.

Smyrna stitch is a form of cross stitch used in needlepoint. It was popular during the Victorian period and again, later, in the 1950s and 1960s. It comprises a cross stitch worked over two, or more, threads with a straight cross stitch worked over the top.

Thérèse de Dilmont in the Encyclopedia of Needlework gives the following description:

Make a plain cross stitch over four threads, each way, and then over that, another cross stitch, standing upright. The same stitch can be made over six or seven threads; if you work over more than four threads, it follows that you increase the number of stitches accordingly.
