= Bargello (needlework) =

Embroidery with a motif of vertical stitches

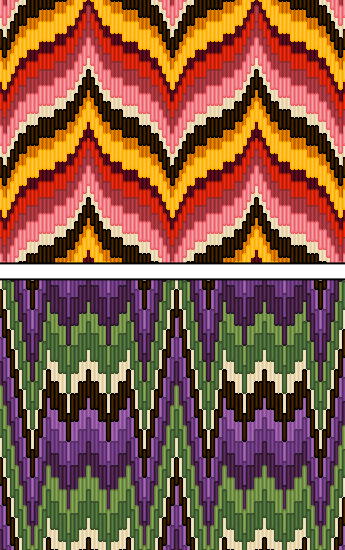
Two examples of Bargello patterns (Florentine work). The top is a typical curved Bargello motif. The bottom image is a "flame stitch" motif similar to that found in the Bargello museum chairs.

Bargello is a type of needlepoint embroidery consisting of upright flat stitches laid in a mathematical pattern to create motifs. The name originates from a series of chairs found in the Bargello palace in Florence, which have a "flame stitch" pattern.

Traditionally, Bargello was stitched in wool on canvas. Embroidery done this way is remarkably durable. It is well suited for use on pillows, upholstery and even carpets, but not for clothing. In most traditional pieces, all stitches are vertical with stitches going over two or more threads.

Traditional designs are very colourful, and use many hues of one colour, which produces intricate shading effects. The patterns are naturally geometric, but can also resemble very stylised flowers or fruits.

== Alternative names ==
A number of alternative names are used by different scholars, including:

- Florentine work - after the fact that the Bargello Museum is in Florence.
- Hungarian point (punto unghero) - in Italian, Bargello is known as "Hungarian Point", indicating that the Florentines believed the technique originated in Hungary. However, English embroidery vocabulary also includes a diamond-shaped stitch called Hungarian point, so few English-language books use this term to refer to Bargello.
- Flame stitch (punto fiamma) - a type of Bargello motif in which zig-zag or flames are created. The chairs in the Bargello Museum do use flame stitch motifs, but curved motifs are also common (see below). These curved Bargello motifs would normally not be "flame stitch", but would be called Bargello.
- Irish stitch - a term found in early modern British sources, equated with Bargello. Lady Anne Clifford mentioned working Irish stitch cushion covers in her diary.

Because of the potential for confusion, most books written in English refer to the technique simply as "Bargello".

== History ==
As with many traditional crafts, the origins of Bargello are not well documented. Although early examples are from the Bargello Museum in Florence, there does exist documentation that a Hungarian connection is possible. For one thing, the Bargello Museum inventory identifies the chairs in its inventory as "17th century with backs and seats done in punto unghero (Hungarian Point)". In the 18th century, Queen Maria Theresa of Hungary stitched Bargello and her work has been preserved in the Hungarian National Museum.

Petschek also cites legend of Hungarian noblewomen practicing the craft, including a Hungarian princess marrying into the de Medici family, and a princess Jadwiga (Hedwig) of Hungary who married into the Jagiełło dynasty of Poland.

It is unknown if those were distinct developments or if they influenced each other. Both Bargello and Hungarian Point tend to be colorful and use many hues of one color, which produces intricate shading effects. The patterns are naturally geometric, but can also resemble very stylized flowers or fruits.

== Bargello technique ==
Bargello refers not to just a stitching technique, but also to motifs created by the change of colors in the stitches. This section describes the vertical stitch, and how it is combined with color and "stepping" to create different motifs.

=== Vertical stitches ===
Most agree that traditional Bargello pieces incorporate a series of all vertical stitches (vs. diagonal stitches). The basic unit is usually a vertical stitch of four threads, but other heights are possible.

Some Bargello pieces use only one height of stitch, but even the earliest pieces (such as chairs in the Bargello museum) combine different heights of stitches.

=== Stepping ===
Bargello patterns are formed when vertical stitches are stepped, or offset vertically, usually by two threads (i.e., halfway down a unit of four threads). The patterns in the steps combined with color changes determines how the overall pattern will emerge.

=== Flame (sharp) vs. curved motifs ===
If vertical stitches are stepped down quickly, the design forms sharp points or zig-zags. This type of Bargello motif is often known as flame stitch. Flame stitch can be found on the Bargello Museum chairs.

If steps are gradual, then the design will appear to be curved. Traditional curved Bargello motifs include medallions and ribbons.

=== Traditional Bargello motifs ===
There are many identified motifs possible, but some common ones include:

==== Flame zigzag (sharp) ====
Stitches step sharply across the design.

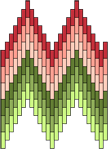
Flame stitch motif

==== Diamonds (sharp) ====
Stitches step sharply across the designs and color changes cause diamonds to appear.

Diamond motif

==== Ribbons (curved) ====
Stitches are gradually stepped in different colors.

==== Medallions (curved) ====
Stitches are gradually stepped and color changes cause spheres or medallions to appear.

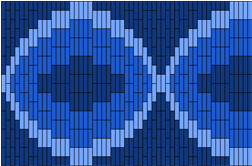
Medallion design

== Modern Bargello ==
Since the revival of Bargello in the 1960s, the technique has evolved in different directions. Although traditional Bargello is still stitched, modern designers have expanded the repertoire of design possibilities.

=== Four-way and eight-way Bargello ===
Traditional Bargello is executed with just a vertical stitch in one direction, but Dorothy Kaestner created a style of Bargello called four-way Bargello. In this technique, the canvas is first divided diagonally into quarters. Then the same motif is worked in horizontal stitches in two opposite areas, and vertical stitches in the remaining two areas. The resulting design frequently resembles a kaleidoscope effect.

Kaestner describes the origin of the technique:

My first piece of four-way Bargello was started approximately ten years ago [in the early 1960s]. I placed a mirror on a Bargello design in a way that showed me how it would look if I mitered [turned] a corner. This intrigued me so much, I graphed a design starting in the center and mitering all four corners.

This concept has been expanded to eight-way Bargello, or Bargello stitches in eight directions (horizontal stitches, vertical stitches and diagonal stitches).

=== Bargello band samplers ===
Designers of band samplers may include a band of a Bargello motif among other sampler stitches. Unlike traditional Bargello, these bands are stitched with the same stranded cotton, silk or linen embroidery thread used in band samplers.

=== Bargello quilts ===
In addition to Bargello embroidery, there are now Bargello quilts in which the patterns used in Bargello embroidery are constructed with strips of fabric of the same height but different widths.

Bargello quilts are strip-pieced; the fabric is cut into long strips and sewn together in graduated color groups. The strips are cut into rows of squares and rectangles, and sewn together to form different patterns.

== Sources ==
- Barnes, Charles; Blake, David P. (1971). Bargello and related stitchery. Hearthside Press. ISBN 978-0-8208-0337-1. OCLC 161875.
- Angell, Laura and Lynsey Bargello Stitch (2020) Search Press/Dover.
- Boyles, Margaret (1974) Bargello: An Explosion in Color Macmillan Publishing Company.
- Boyles, Margaret (1976) The Margaret Boyles Bargello Workbook: A Collection of Original Designs Macmillan Publishing Co., Inc.
- Edie, Marge (1994) Bargello Quilts That Patchwork Place; Reprint edition.
- Fischer, Pauline and Anabel Lasker (1972) Bargello Magic; How to Design Your Own Holt, Rinehart, and Winston.
- Kaestner, Dorothy (1972). Four way bargello (Rev. ed.). New York: Scribner. ISBN 978-0684129129.
- Kaestner, Dorothy (1984) Bargello Antics Encore Editions.
- Kaestner, Dorothy (1990) Needlepoint Bargello Prentice Hall.
- Petschek, Joyce S. (1997). Beautiful bargello: 26 charted bargello and needlepoint designs. North Pomfret, Vermont: Trafalgar Square. ISBN 978-1570760938. OL 25080128W.
- Rome, Carol Cheney (1988) A New Look at Bargello: The Florentine Needlepoint Stitch Book Crown Publishers.
- Silverstein, Mira (1973) Bargello Plus Scribner.
- Snook, Barbara (1967) Florentine Embroidery Scribner; Second edition.
- Stevens, Gigs (1977) Free-form bargello. Scribner.
- Williams, Elsa S. (1967). Bargello; Florentine canvas work. New York: Van Nostrand Reinhold. ISBN 978-0442294816.
- Williams, Beth Ann (2001) Colorwash Bargello Quilts Martingale & Company.
- Wright, Eileen (2009) Twist and Turn Bargello Quilts That Patchwork Place.
