= Bradford carpet =

17th century carpet in England

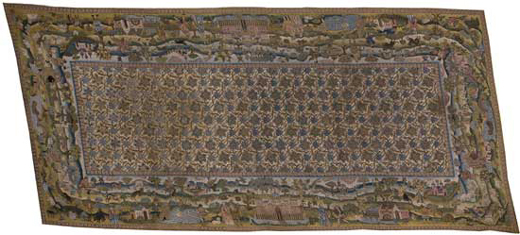
The Bradford carpet

The Bradford Carpet is a canvas work embroidery made in the early 17th century (ca. 1600–1615) that originally belonged to the Earl of Bradford at Castle Bromwich.

The carpet measures 16 by 6 feet (4.9 m × 1.8 m). In the Victoria and Albert Museum it covers an entire wall. However, it was made neither for wall nor floor, but as a table covering. Its 17-inch-wide (430 mm) border was designed to hang down over the edges of a table, and it would have been removed or covered with a linen cloth when the table was used.

The carpet is worked with silk embroidery thread in tent stitch on a linen ground. The stitching is very fine (400 stitches/inch, 62 stitches/cm) and was worked in at least 23 different colours. The tension of the tent stitches over time has distorted the shape of the carpet. It is characteristic of professional canvas work popular for furnishings in the Elizabethan era. The field design is a grape vine trellis. The border, thought to represent human progression from a wild state to civilisation, depicts a variety of country pursuits set against a pastoral landscape, described as "perhaps the finest range of genre scenes to come down to us from Elizabethan times". A manor house, shepherd, travelling vendor with his packhorse, lords and ladies, hunting scenes, milkmaids, millers, water mills and windmills are all shown.
