= Broderers' Hall =

Former livery hall in the City of London

Coordinates: 51°30′54.8″N 0°5′43.59″W

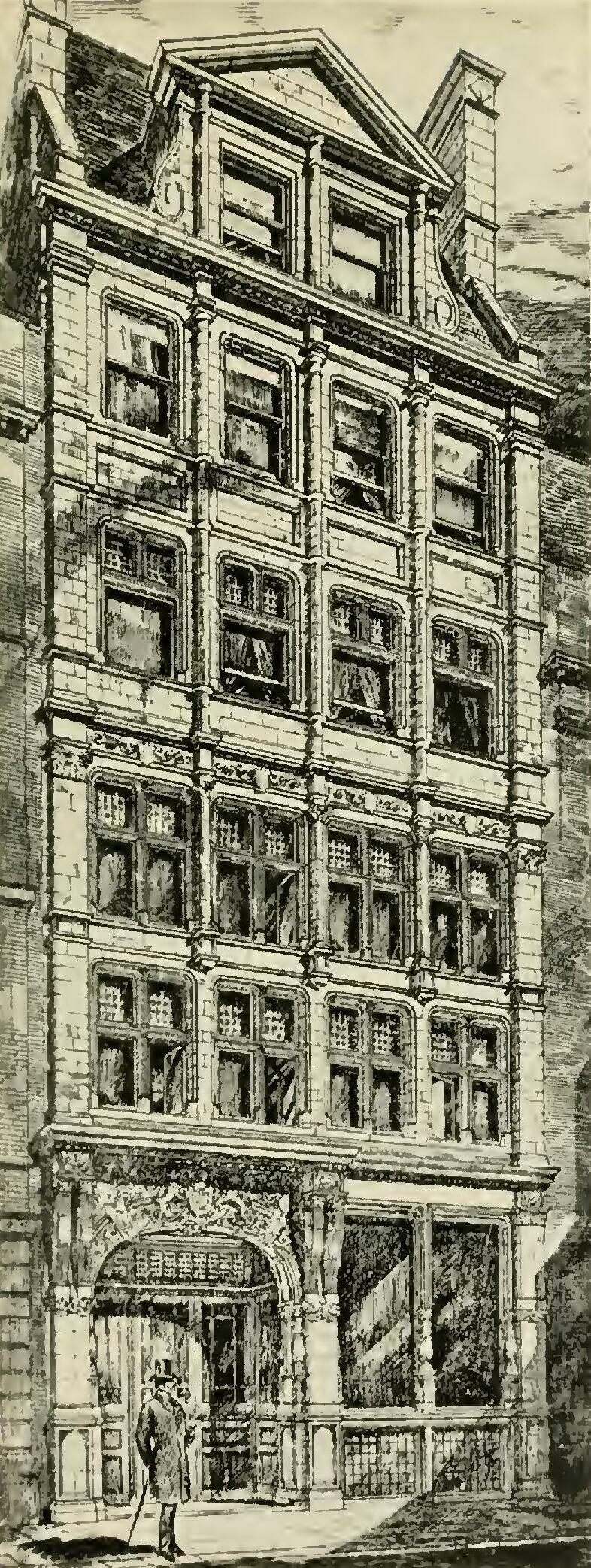
Image of the hall circa 1910

The Broderers' Hall or Embroiderers' Hall at 36 Gutter Lane was the livery hall of the Worshipful Company of Broderers, the City of London livery company for embroiderers from 1515 until its destruction in 1940.

The hall was originally a monastery that dated from the 10th century. The site for the hall was bought with the proceeds of a bequest from a John Throwstone in 1519. The hall was rebuilt after being damaged in the Great Fire of London in 1666. It was described in 1815 by John Wilkes in his Encyclopaedia Londinensis as a "small but very handsome building". After being little used by the Company of Broderers, it became a warehouse in the 19th century. In 1889 during excavations for a basement, human bones were found as well as pieces of poetry and glass from Londinium, the Roman settlement.

The hall was destroyed in World War II in 1940, during the London blitz. The Broderers sold the site of the hall in 1957, and a plaque now marks the spot where it once stood, now 33 Gutter Lane, an office building. The Worshipful Company of Broderers now dine in Mercers' Hall, the hall of the Worshipful Company of Mercers. The Broderers gave the Mercers an altar cloth for their chapel in 1958.
