= Embroidery hoops and frames =

Tool for holding fabric taut during embroidery

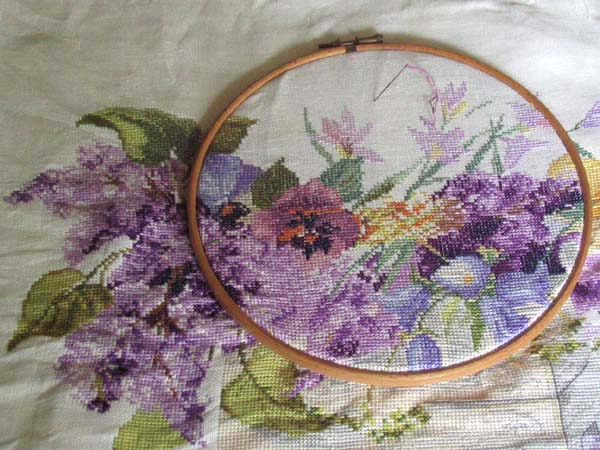
An embroidery hoop.

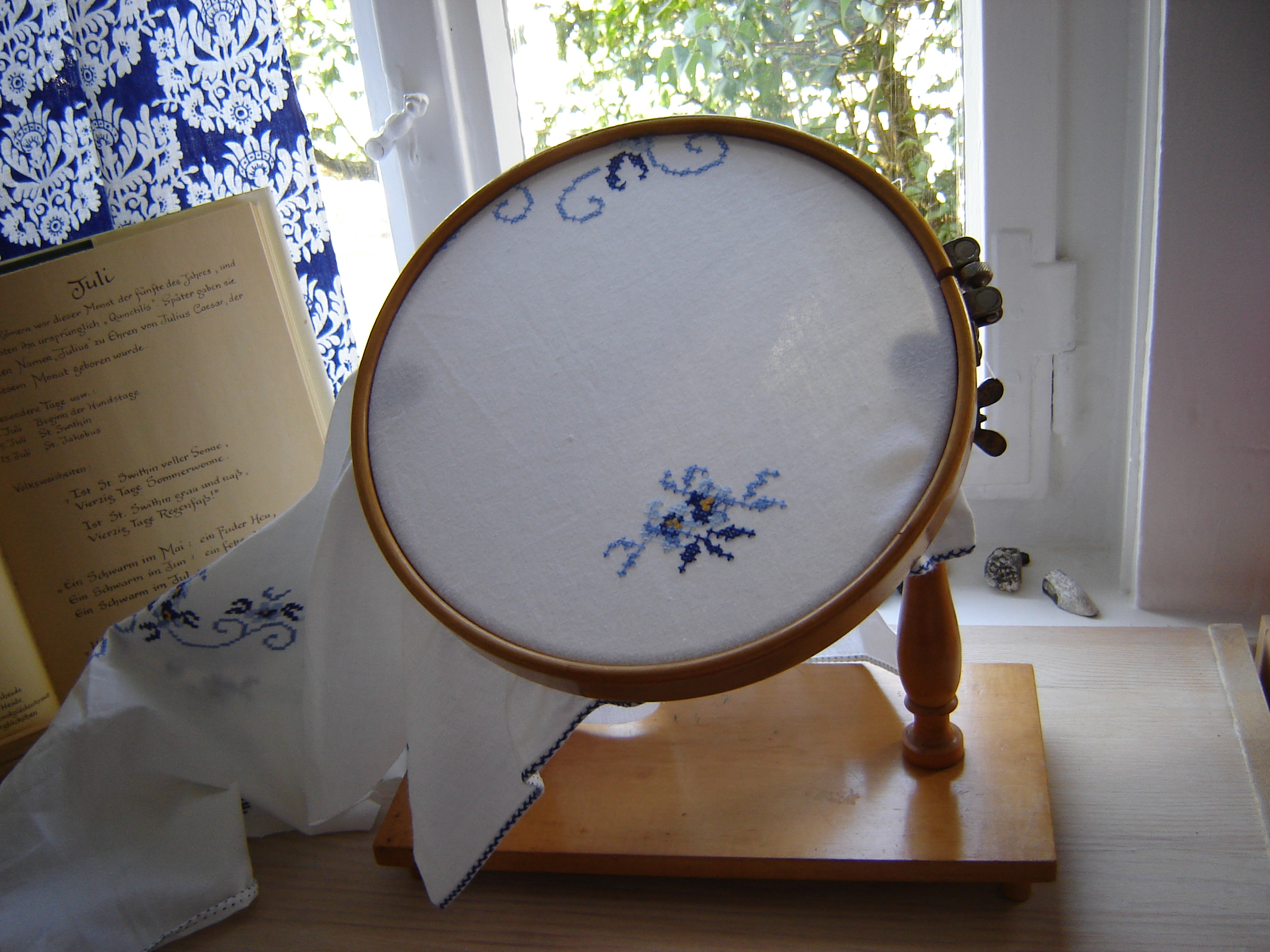
Embroidery hoop with stand

Embroidery hoops and frames are tools used to keep fabric taut while working embroidery or other forms of needlework.

== Hoops ==
An embroidery hoop or (earlier) tambour frame consists of a pair of concentric circular or elliptical rings. The larger ring has a tightening device, usually in the form of a metal screw. The artisan repositions the hoop as needed when working over a large piece of fabric. Embroidery hoops come in various sizes and are generally small enough to control with one hand and rest in the lap. Hoops were originally made of wood, bone, or ivory; modern hoops are made of wood or plastic. Hoops may be attached to a table-top or floor stand when both hands must be free for sewing, as in making tambour lace. Standing floor frames and lap frames allow the crafter to keep both hands free for working, which increases the speed and precision of work performed.

Some modern embroidery hoops, instead of having a tightening device, has a rubber band-style ring that fits over the fabric, and the smaller ring.

Very thin plastic hoops are also used in machine embroidery.

== Scroll frames ==
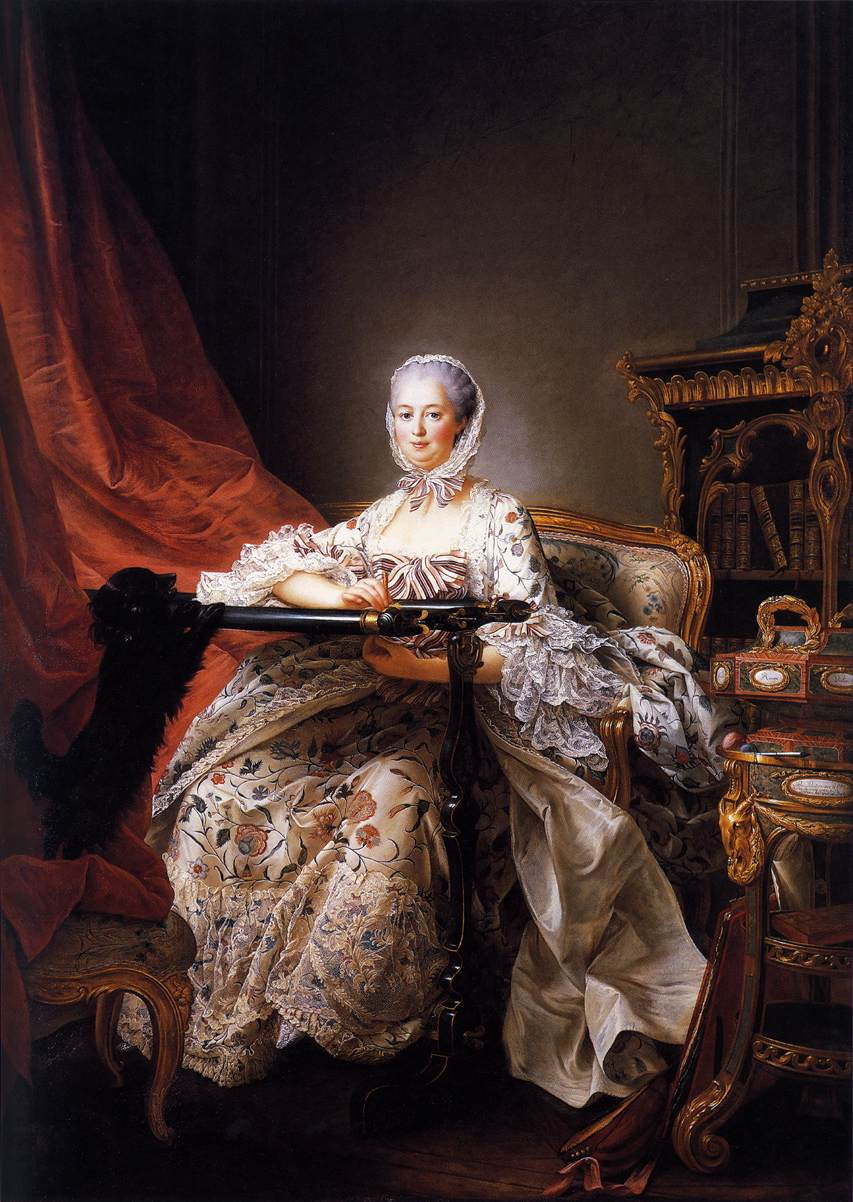
Madame de Pompadour working at a tambour frame

A scroll frame or embroidery frame keeps the entire piece of fabric taut, rather than just the piece being worked. It is made of four pieces of wood: two rollers for the top and base, and two side pieces. Each of the rollers has a piece of fabric securely nailed or stapled along it and holes in its ends to hold the side pieces, which can be secured in place with wing nuts to adjust the width of the frame and the tautness of the stretched fabric. The ends of the ground fabric are sewn to the rollers, which are turned until the area of the fabric to be worked is stretched within the frame.

Frames are used in needlepoint and other forms of canvas work as well as embroidery.

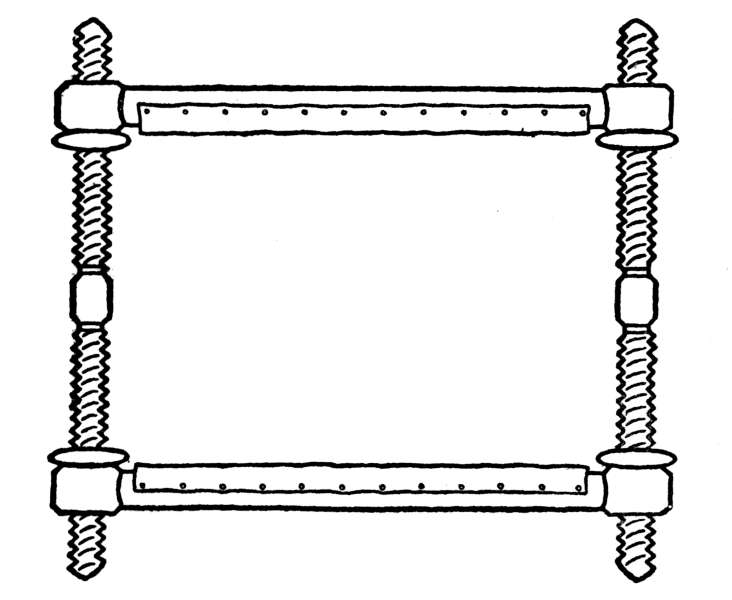
Embroidery frame

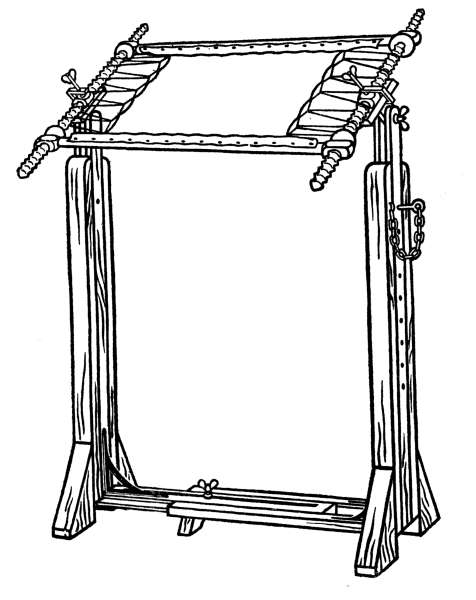
Free-standing embroidery frame with fabric attached
