= Gobelin stitch =

Type of stitch used in needlepoint

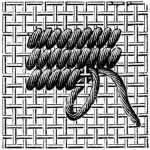
Gobelin stitch.

Gobelin stitch is a slanting stitch used in needlepoint. Gobelin stitch takes its name from its resemblance to the texture of woven tapestries produced by the famous French factory at Gobelins.

According to Thérèse de Dilmont in the Encyclopedia of Needlework:

This is worked over two horizontal threads and one perpendicular. In a frame, you can work the second row, from right to left, otherwise, you must turn the work round, and bring out your needle behind the last-made stitch.
