= Candace Bahouth =

American textile and mosaic artist

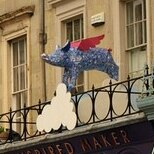
Pig-eon in Bath

Candace Bahouth (/ˈbeɪhuːθ/ BAY-hooth) is an American-born, British-based artist known for her tapestry portraiture, needlepoint designs, and mosaic work using broken china and found objects.

== Work ==
Bahouth initially focused on tapestry weaving, and explored the effect of using tapestry for portraiture and for topics not usually associated with it, such as the punk subculture. She first came to critical attention in the 1970s for her tapestry portraits, beginning with one of Gilbert & George, and in 1977 she was commissioned by the Radio Times to produce a tapestry for the cover of the issue commemorating Elizabeth II's Silver Jubilee. Two 1980 works, Girl Punk and Boy Punk, are held at the V&A, and two tapestry-woven punk dolls are in the collection of the Whitworth. Her work has been featured regularly in exhibitions since 1976, including at the Courtauld Institute and Institute of Contemporary Arts, with her first international exhibition coming in Switzerland in 1985.

She has designed needlepoint patterns for Hugh Ehrman's Ehrman Tapestry brand for more than thirty years, specialising in medieval-style motifs and designs inspired by the work of Gustav Klimt. Through Ehrman she met and became friends with the designer Kaffe Fassett; Bahouth and Fassett have since jointly exhibited at Victoria Art Gallery three times in 2008, 2018 and 2023.

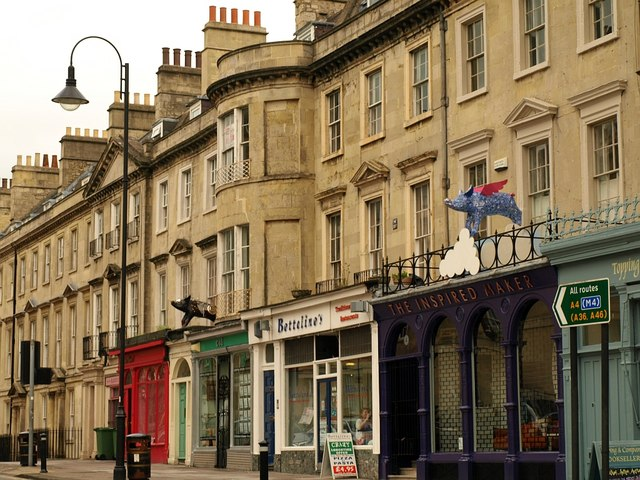
One of Bahouth's mosaic sculptures, Pig-eon the flying pig, on display in Bath

Bahouth took up mosaic as a medium after a director of the Moorcroft pottery company saw a windowsill she had decorated with china fragments found by her son, and commissioned her to create a mosaic of the company's factory using broken stock. She has contributed mosaic sculptures to various public art projects, including a site-specific piece for an empty tomb niche in Wells Cathedral as part of Wells Art Contemporary 2021, and a flying pig to the King Bladud's Pigs project in Bath.

In interviews she has cited Francis Bacon and Antoni Gaudí as artistic inspirations, along with admiring Banksy for his art and activism.

The National Portrait Gallery holds a portrait of Bahouth taken in the mid-seventies by photographer David Cripps.

== Personal life ==
Bahouth was born in New York to a Lebanese-Palestinian father and an Italian mother. She started making art as a teenager, and went on to study fine art at Syracuse University. In the early 1970s, having married an Englishman, she moved to the UK and took up residence in a converted church in Pilton, Somerset, where she still lives. She has one son.

She became friends with Michael Eavis not long after moving to Pilton and has attended every Glastonbury Festival since. Over the festival, Bahouth converts her house into a B&B for festival-goers or, on occasion, artists: in 2011 she hosted Arthur Brown and the then up-and-coming Ed Sheeran.

She has contributed to fundraisers for Palestinian charities, donating a piece to the 2008 Occupied Space: Art for Palestine exhibition, and more recently opening her garden to visitors with proceeds going to the Gaza Sunbirds para-cycling team.

== Books ==
- Flowers, Birds and Unicorns: Medieval Needlepoint (1993). ISBN 9780810933163.
- Candace Bahouth's Romantic Needlepoint (1995). ISBN 185029707X.
- Candace Bahouth's Medieval Needlepoint (1997). ISBN 1850298998.
- Mosaics: Inspirations and 24 Original Projects, with Kaffe Fassett (1999). ISBN 0091868548.
- Mosaics: Inspiration and Original Projects for Interiors and Exteriors, with Kaffe Fassett (1999). ISBN 9781561583737.
- (as editor) Glastonbury: Another Stage, by Venetia Dearden (2010). ISBN 9783868280463
