= Worshipful Company of Broderers =

Livery company of the City of London

The Worshipful Company of Broderers is one of the livery companies of the City of London. "Broderer" is an archaic synonym for "embroiderer". The organization existed in at least 1376, and was officially incorporated by a royal charter in 1561. As the craft of embroidery has lost its importance as a trade, the company has become less of a trade association for broderers. Instead, the company is now, as are most livery companies, a charitable foundation.

The company is the forty-eighth in the order of precedence for livery companies. Its motto is Omnia Desuper, Latin for All From Above.

The livery hall of the Broderers, Broderers' Hall, stood on Gutter Lane from 1515 until its destruction in the London blitz. The Broderers now dine in Mercers' Hall.

== Arms ==
Coat of arms of Worshipful Company of Broderers
Crest On a wreath argent and gules, A hurt radiated Or and charged with a St. Esprit displayed argent, beaked and membered gules. Mantled gules, doubled argent. Escutcheon Paly of six argent and azure, on a fesse gules between three lions passant guardant Or, armed and langued gules, two broaches in saltire between as many quills of the third. Supporters On either side a lion rampant Or gutty de sang. Motto Omnia desuper.
