= Celtic cross stitch =

Type of embroidery

Celtic cross stitch is a style of cross-stitch embroidery which recreates Celtic art patterns typical of early medieval Insular art using contemporary cross-stitch techniques. Celtic cross stitch typically employs rich, deep colors, intricate geometrical patterns, spirals, interlacing patterns, knotwork, alphabets, animal forms and zoomorphic patterns, similar to the decorations found in the Book of Kells.

Although they share design inspirations, today's Celtic cross-stitch differs from the embroidery of the Celtic Revival of the late 19th and early 20th century which employed freehand surface embroidery stitches in line with the principles of the Arts and Crafts Movement (see art needlework).

Celtic cross stitch embroideries are very much part of the heritage found in Scotland, Isle of Man and Ireland. These cross stitch patterns are used to decorate everyday items, such as cushion covers, wall tapestries and decorations, tea cozies, eyeglass covers and clothing.
