= Tent stitch =

Small, diagonal needlepoint or canvas work embroidery stitch

Tent stitch is a small, diagonal needlepoint stitch that crosses over the intersection of one horizontal (weft) and one vertical (warp) thread of needlepoint canvas forming a slanted stitch at a 45-degree angle. It is also known as needlepoint stitch and is one of the most basic and versatile stitches used in needlepoint and other canvas work embroidery. When worked on fine weave canvas over a single warp and weft thread it is known as petit point in contrast to stitches, such as Gobelin, worked over multiple warp and/or weft threads.

"Petit point" comes from the French language, meaning "small point" or "dot".

== Tent stitch variants ==
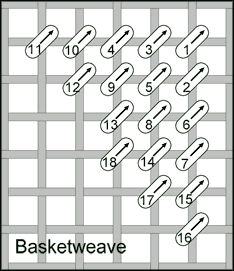
Basketweave tent stitch

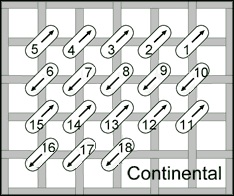
Continental tent stitch

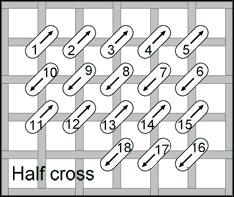
Half cross tent stitch

There are three types of tent stitch, all producing the same appearance on the front of the canvas but each worked in a slightly different way and having particular characteristics, uses, benefits and drawbacks. These variants of tent stitch are known as basketweave, continental and half cross tent stitches:

- Basketweave tent stitch
  The basketweave form of tent stitch is worked in diagonal rows up and down the canvas. The yarn on the back of the canvas has a typical basketweave appearance, with alternating horizontal and vertical stitches. Basketweave is the best stitch to cover large areas of canvas as it distorts the canvas least and gives the firmest backing to the work, provided it is worked in diagonal rows alternately ascending and descending so that the yarn in ascending rows is laid over warp threads and in descending rows is laid over weft threads:
- Continental tent stitch
  Continental stitch is worked horizontally or vertically across the canvas. On the back of the work, the stitches appear diagonally across two threads. This method uses more yarn than half cross stitch tent stitch but is more hardwearing.
- Half cross tent stitch
  Half cross stitch is worked horizontally or vertically across the canvas. On the back of the work, the stitch appears vertical or horizontal, not diagonal, and crosses only one thread. This method uses less yarn than other stitches but is not very durable as coverage on the back of the canvas is a little thin.
