= Campaign hat =

Broad-brimmed hat with a high, pinched crown

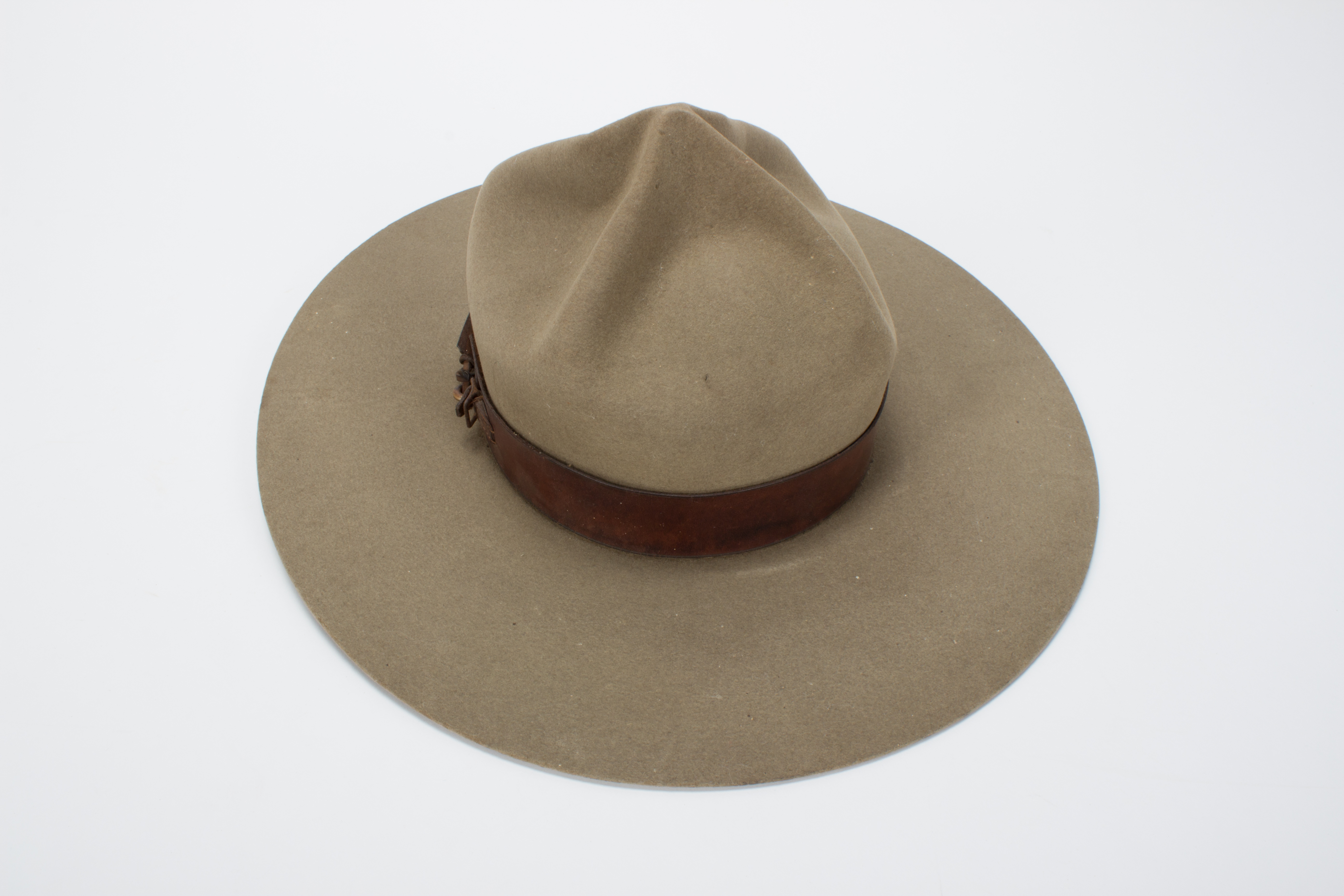
A campaign hat used by the Legion of Frontiersmen, c. 1910s

A campaign hat, sometimes called campaign cover, is a broad-brimmed felt or straw hat, with a high crown, pinched symmetrically at the four corners. The campaign hat is occasionally referred to as a Stetson, derived from its origin in the company's Boss of the Plains model in the late 19th century.

The hat is most commonly worn as part of a uniform, by such organizations as the Royal Canadian Mounted Police (RCMP), the New Zealand Army, United States Park Rangers, and Scouts. It should not be confused with the Stetson style cowboy hat, which is also based on the Boss of the Plains but has a different brim and crease, nor a slouch hat.

== History ==
The origins of the hat can be traced to the 1840s when U.S. Army mounted troops posted to the far-west sometimes wore wide-brimmed civilian hats, which were more practical than the regulation shakos and forage caps then issued. The crease was influenced by the designs of the sombreros worn by the Mexican Vaqueros. The name started to be used after the 1872–1876 regulations, which introduced a black felt hat—which could be drab after 1883—for fatigue use derived from the types popularized during the American Civil War. Some were worn with campaign cords, mainly as a form of decoration.

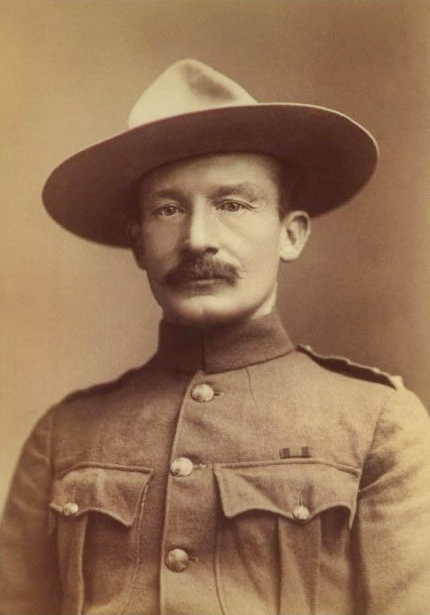
Photo portrait of Major-General Robert Baden-Powell wearing a campaign hat, 1896

At least as early as 1893, hats of the Stetson Boss of the Plains type were being creased into pointed tops by British South Africa Company (BSAC) scouts in Africa. When designing the iconic uniform for Boy Scouts, Robert Baden-Powell drew on the hat worn by Frederick Russell Burnham, the celebrated American scout, during his service as Chief of Scouts in the BSAC and the British Army in the 1890s. The 1,200 Canadian troops serving under Baden-Powell were the first to wear the campaign hat as a part of their official uniform, and this very likely influenced Baden-Powell's decision to order 10,000 of the hats for the British troops.

A version of the hat, with a crease along the top of the crown, was worn by some US Army troops during the Spanish–American War. The army officially adopted the "Montana peaked" design as a service hat on 8 September 1911.

Through the World War I era, the campaign hat worn by American soldiers was fairly soft. Those worn by the United States Army's general officers had a golden cord around it, whereas other commissioned officers had a golden-and-black campaign cord around their hat. Field clerks, as well as their post-war successors the warrant officers, had a silver-and-black cord, while other ranks had cords in their branch-of-service colors. The United States Marine Corps had the Eagle, Globe, and Anchor badge in black at the front of their campaign hats; its officers had an additional golden-and-scarlet cord around their hat, whereas its other ranks had none.

By the 1930s, the felt was made very stiff with a permanently flat brim. Due to the frequent wearing of helmets in France in World War I, most troops received a copy of the French bonnet de police that became known as the overseas cap. From 1940 onwards, the campaign hat was replaced by the much cheaper American fiber helmet. In 1942 the campaign hat ceased to be issued generally, but it was still commonly found in the Pacific theatre for much of the war, and was the trademark of General Joseph Stilwell.

== Current use ==
=== Canada ===
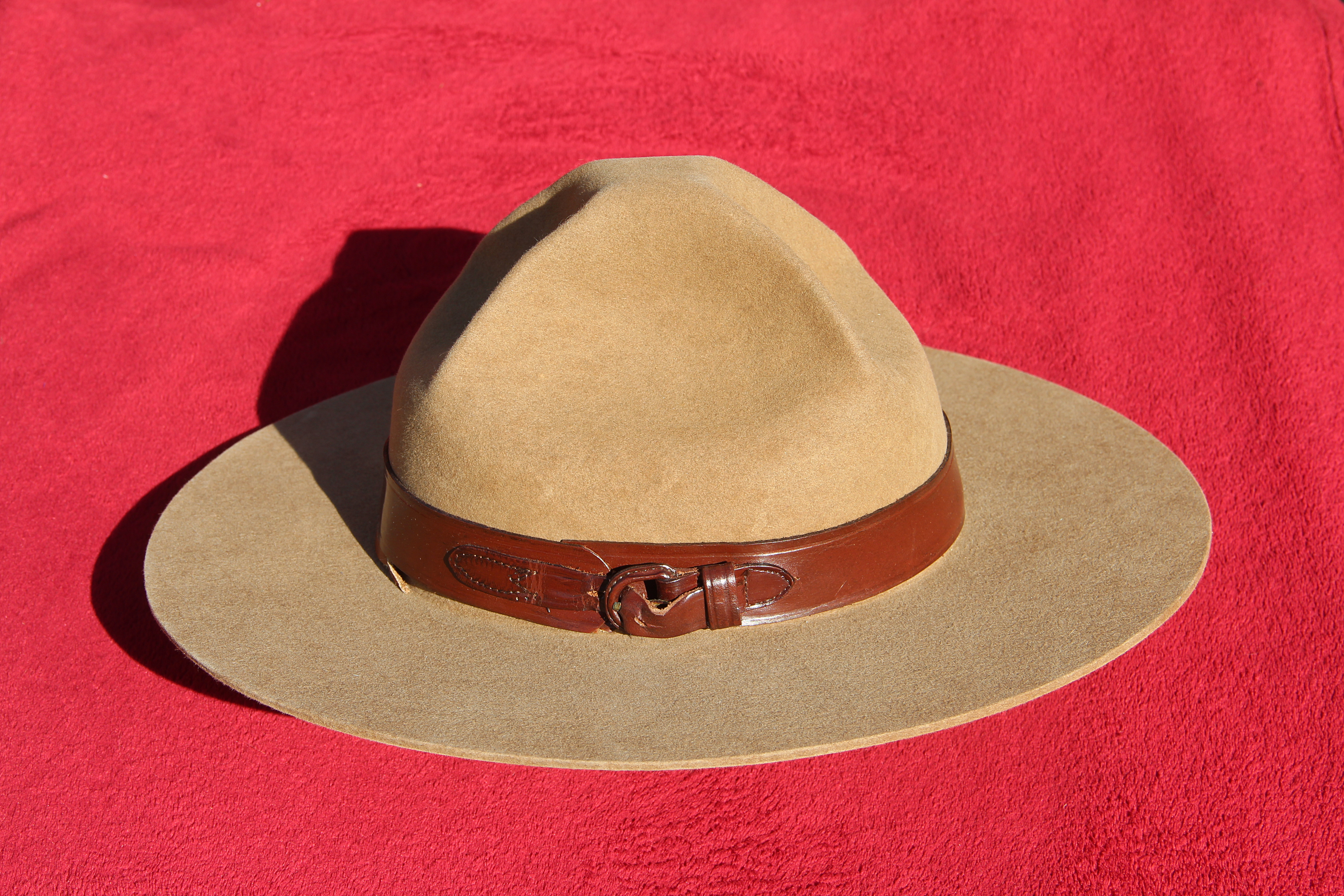
Royal Canadian Mounted Police felt campaign hat

In Canada, the campaign hat was the official dress hat of the North-West Mounted Police (later Royal Canadian Mounted Police, who retain it as part of the full dress uniform) as well as Canadian cavalry units in the Boer War and First World War. In the Boer War (South Africa 1899 to 1902) all Canadian military units with the exception of the Royal Canadian Regiment wore campaign hats. The campaign hat was also the hat of the Canadian Scouts and the South African Constabulary, both of these units having many Canadians enlisted. The hat was phased out of military use by the service dress cap following the First World War. Canadian campaign hats have deep indentations at the face of the hat.

The campaign hat is currently worn by several law enforcement organizations, including the Alberta Sheriffs Branch, as a part of their regular uniform. It was also used by members of the Ontario Provincial Police, but it was phased out in 2009 due to problems wearing them in police cruisers.

=== New Zealand ===
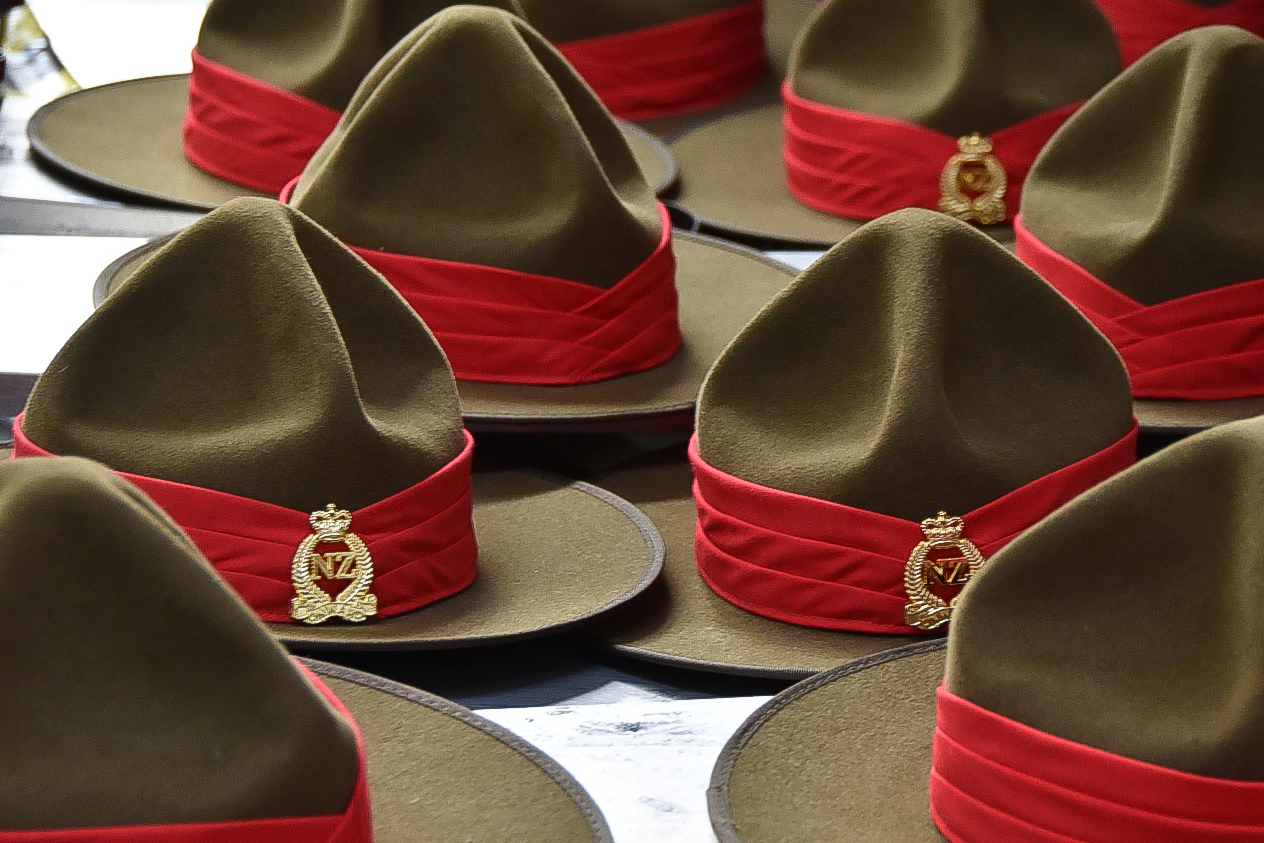
New Zealand Army felt campaign hats or "Lemon Squeezers" are adorned with coloured puggarees

The New Zealand Army have a distinctive felt campaign hat as their most visible national distinction. This headdress is known colloquially as the "lemon squeezer" and is distinguished by a high crown and deep indentations on all four sides. It was adopted by the Wellington Infantry Regiment about 1912 (as proposed by its commander Lieutenant Colonel William Malone) and became general issue for all New Zealand units during the latter stages of World War I. In addition to badge insignia, the different branches of service were differentiated by coloured puggarees or wide bands around the base of the crown (blue and red for artillery, khaki and green for mounted rifles, khaki and red for infantry, blue for engineers, yellow for Pay Corps, khaki and white for Army Service Corps, cherry-red for the Medical Corps and maroon for the Veterinary Corps).

The hat was worn to a certain extent during World War II, although often replaced by more convenient forage caps or berets. After being in abeyance since 1960, the hat was reintroduced in 1977 for ceremonial dress, where it was usually worn with a version of the khaki "no 2" service dress of the British Army. Officer cadets and the New Zealand Army Band wear this headdress with a scarlet and blue full dress uniform.

In 2012, it was announced that this form of campaign hat was to be replaced for general wear by the "Mounted Rifles Hat"; a headdress resembling that of the Australian Army slouch hat but without the turned-up side rim. The historic "Lemon Squeezer" has however been retained for use by honour guards and other limited categories on special formal occasions.

=== United States ===
==== Armed forces ====
United States Army drill sergeant hats stacked on top of each other

The hat worn by United States Army drill sergeants is olive drab in color with males wearing a golden Great Seal of the United States on a disc centered on the front (infantry drill sergeants have a blue disc behind the seal) while female drill sergeants wear a gold Coat of Arms of the United States inside a gold ring that is 1 3/4 inches (4.4 cm) in diameter. These cap devices are the same insignia that are traditionally worn on the service cap and the dress cap of army uniforms. Originally beige in color, in 1983 the color was changed to green with the style remaining unchanged. The 133rd Field Artillery Regiment of the Texas Army National Guard wears the Fort Sill–style artillery campaign hat during formal functions, such as the annual Saint Barbara's Day Ball. In January 2026, the army announced that both male and female drill instructors would use the classic campaign cover and retire the green slouch hat.

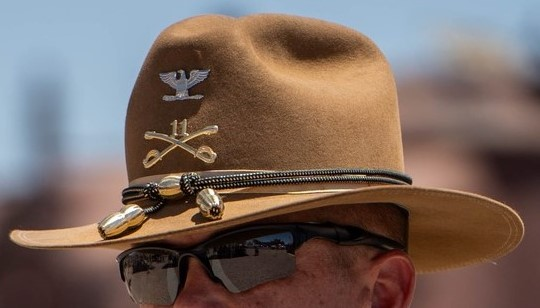
Members of the 11th Armored Cavalry Regiment wearing Cavalry Stetsons, a headgear similar to a campaign hat, but whose brim slightly droops at the front.

The 11th Armored Cavalry Regiment wears the Boss of the Plains brown campaign hat; but instead of being cut and styled in the four peaks, they wear it in a traditional cowboy - cavalry Stetson center peak. The 11th ACR wears their hat this way to honor their heritage dating back to 1901.

Male and female United States Marine Corps drill instructors and primary marksmanship instructors wear similar campaign hats with a matte black Eagle, Globe, and Anchor centered on the front; the same insignia is worn on their olive drab combination hats. While US Marine Corps officers wear a scarlet-and-gold cord around the hats and generals wear a solid gold cord, enlisted marines no longer wear cords around the hats. The US Marine Corps was brought into conformity with the US Army's drill instructor's traditional cover and campaign hats were introduced to the corps on 20 July 1956 as a direct result of the Ribbon Creek incident.

Graduates of the United States Marine Corps drill instructor school wearing their campaign hats

Male United States Air Force military training instructors (MTIs) wear dark blue hats with the Great Seal of the United States within a ring, in silver color, again centered on the front; this is the same insignia as worn on their service cap. Female MTIs wear an Australian-style dark blue slouch hat. Air Force MTIs in the top ten percent of their career field wear a light blue cord and are more likely to be referred to as "Blue Ropes" than MTIs.

Male United States Space Force MTIs wear dark blue hats with the USSF Delta, Globe, and Orbit with hexagram representing the six services, in silver color, again centered on the front; this is the same insignia as worn on their enlisted service cap. Female MTIs wear an Australian-style dark blue slouch hat. Space Force MTIs that are considered experienced have a black-and-silver rope similar to the army warrant officer rope. There are no other ropes used by USSF MTIs.

A United States Space Force military training instructor with a campaign hat on

US Coast Guard recruit training company commanders (USCG-USN counterpart to drill instructors) wear a navy blue version with a black cord; the insignia worn is the same as worn with the combination cover.

The United States Navy is the only US armed service that does not use the campaign hat. USN recruit division commanders wear normal prescribed covers for their uniforms, with a red aiguillette on their shoulder to show their status.

==== Park rangers ====
Campaign hats are worn by US park rangers of the National Park Service. The federal troops sent to protect the resources of the first national parks were cavalry troopers, whose campaign hat was adopted by the Park Service as a symbol of authority.

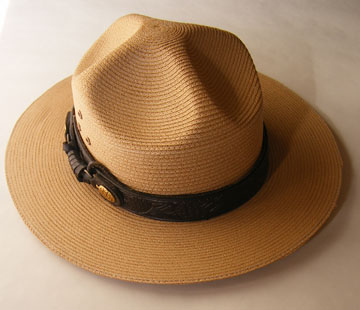
A campaign hat worn by the US National Park Service

The evolution of the campaign hat can be seen in a 1905 photo of Buffalo Soldiers in Yosemite. Although the hat would not become Army standard until six years later, some in the photo have re-creased their hats into the Montana Peak, probably during their service in Cuba or the Philippines during the 1898 Spanish–American War.

Following the national park ranger style, many states' fish and game wardens and state park police wear campaign hats. Rangers of many local parks departments also wear the campaign hat, such as the New York City Urban Park Rangers.

The animal logo-mascot of the US Forest Service, Smokey Bear, wears the campaign hat. Smokey's debut poster, released in 1944 and illustrated by Albert Staehle, depicts Smokey wearing jeans and a "forest ranger's hat" (a campaign hat), pouring a bucket of water on a campfire. The message underneath reads, "Smokey says – Care will prevent 9 out of 10 forest fires!"

The emblem of the National Park Foundation was, until December 2013, a stylized campaign hat.

==== Law enforcement ====
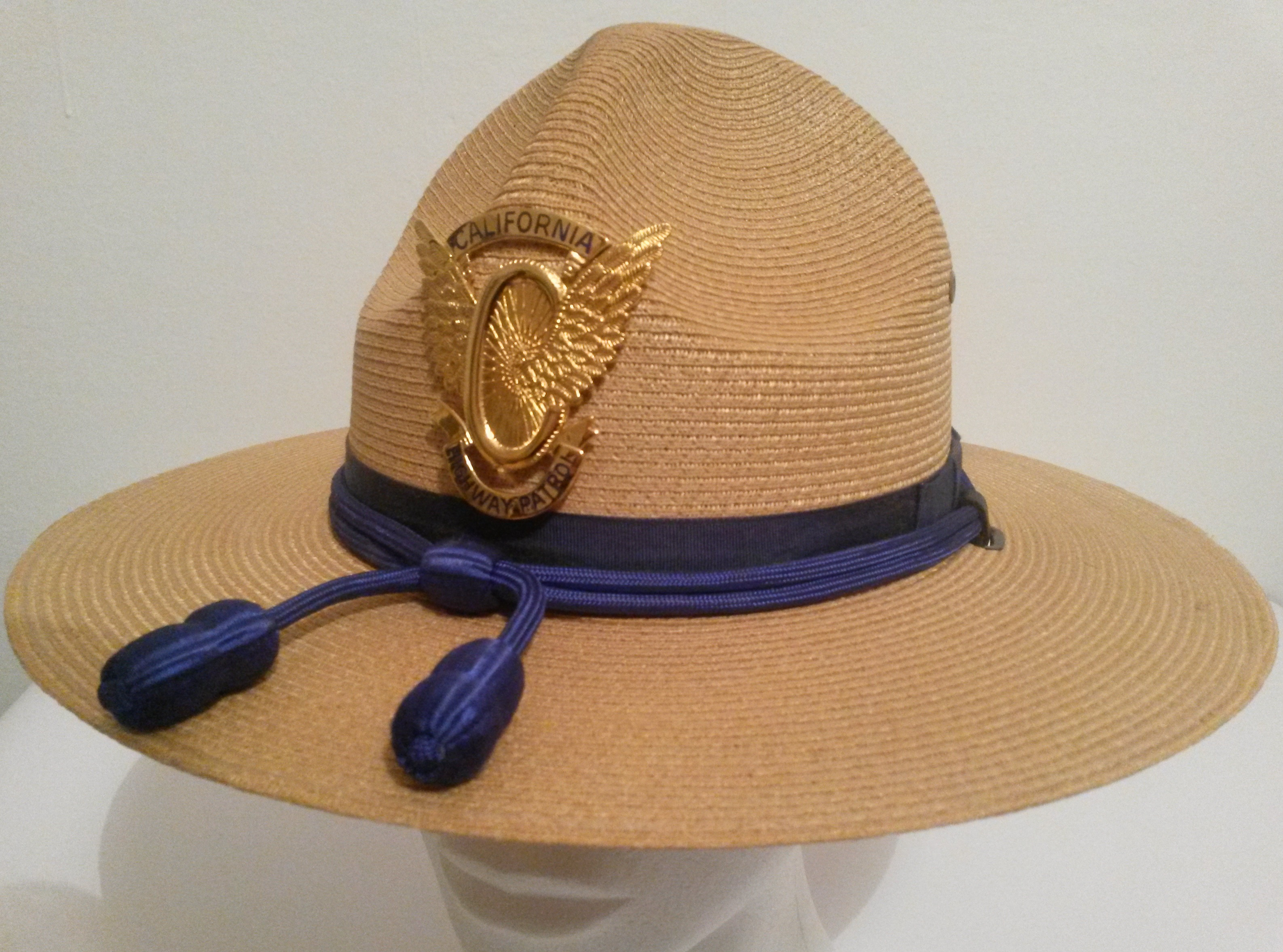
A straw campaign hat used by California Highway Patrol

Several US state police services and federal agencies wear campaign hats. So common is use of the campaign hat among state police agencies that state troopers are sometimes referred to as "smokey bears" or "smokeys," after Smokey Bear.

Campaign hats are also worn by the US Border Patrol. Many other police agencies, including numerous county sheriffs' services, and tribal police departments use campaign hats. Some local police use it for particular duties or divisions; for example, officers of the Chicago Police Department's mounted unit employ the hat, as do deputy sheriffs assigned as cadre of the Cook County Sheriff's Boot Camp.

=== Scout Movement ===
The campaign hat was worn by and associated with Robert Baden-Powell, the founder of the Scout Movement, and is still available for wear by Scout organizations in several countries. Because this style of hat is also so traditionally associated with Scouting, campaign hats are often used as presentation items by troops and local councils for adult Scouters and community and business leaders being honored for their service to the Scouting movement.

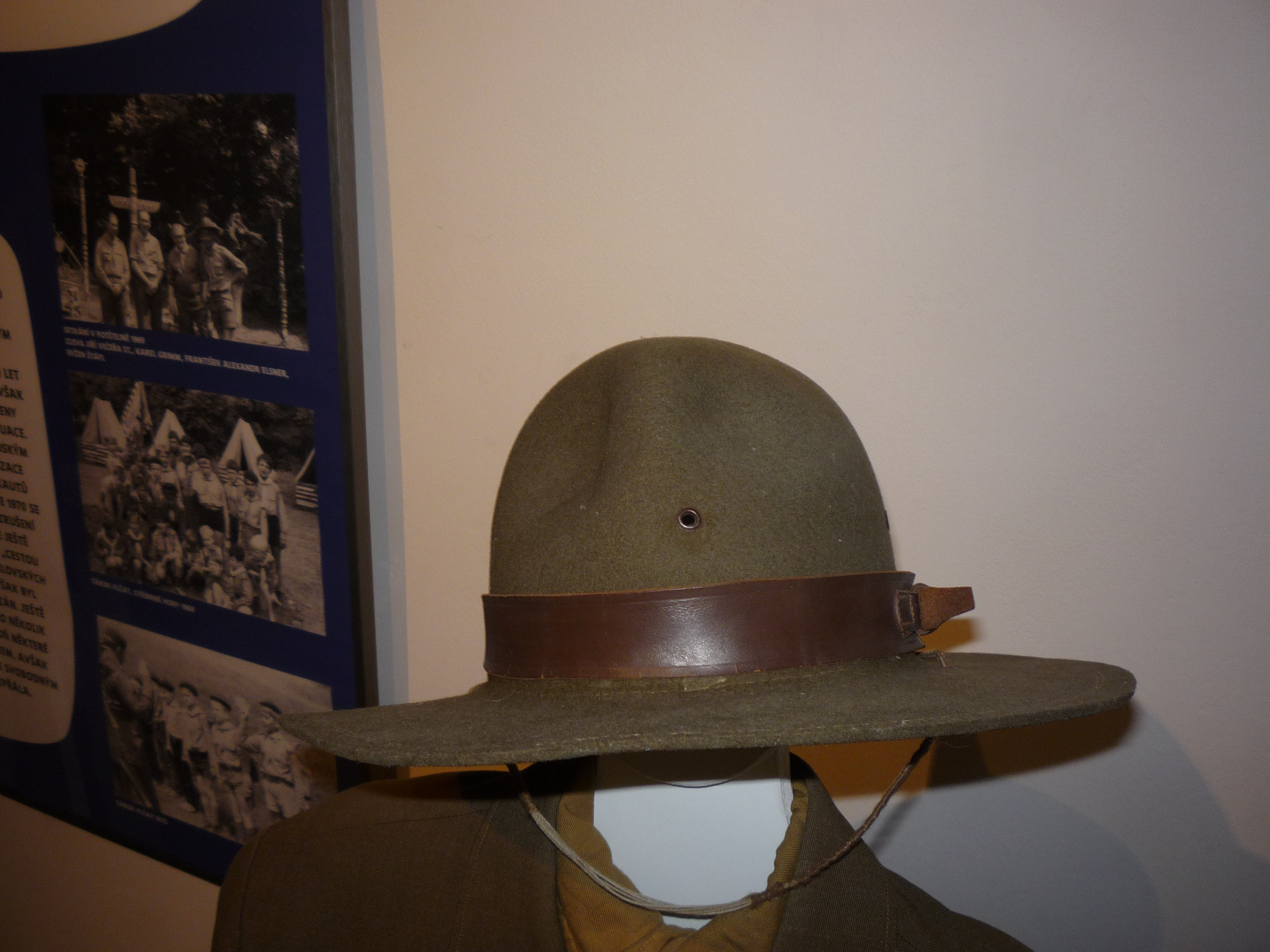
A campaign hat worn by Scouts in the Czech Republic.

Baden-Powell was British, but picked up the habit of wearing a Stetson campaign hat and neckerchief for the first time in 1896 in Africa during the Second Matabele War. It was during this time that Baden-Powell, already a cavalryman, was befriended by the celebrated American scout Frederick Russell Burnham, who favored the campaign hat. In the African hills it was Burnham who first introduced Baden-Powell to the ways and methods of the indigenous peoples of the Americas, and taught him woodcraft (better known today as Scoutcraft). After Baden-Powell became famous as the victor of the Siege of Mafeking in 1899, his hat became something of a trademark. In 1900, Baden-Powell was appointed to raise and command the South African Constabulary and he included the campaign hat as part of their uniform. He may have been influenced by the fact that the trade name of the hats, Boss of the Plains, was sometimes abbreviated to B-P, Baden-Powell's own initials.

When Baden-Powell re-wrote his Army handbook Aids to Scouting into Scouting For Boys in 1908, he included sketches of Boy Scouts wearing the campaign hat. He prescribed a campaign hat as part of the Scout uniform, which he stated was "very like the uniform worn by my men when I commanded the South African Constabulary". He continued; "...The broad brimmed khaki hat is a good protection from sun and rain." Scouting for Boys and the Scout Movement itself quickly spread through the British Empire and then to other countries, such as the United States and Russia where in both cases, Scouting started in 1909. Baden-Powell's uniform was widely imitated by Scout associations in many countries, but eventually began to be discarded in favor of cheaper and more practical headgear; the British Scout Association introduced the uniform beret as an alternative to the hat after World War II and finally abolished its use altogether in 1967. The campaign hat remains an option for members of the Boy Scouts of America.

In Traditional Scouting organizations such as the Baden-Powell Scouts' Association, Scouts unitaires de France and British Boy Scouts and British Girl Scouts Association in the United Kingdom, Baden-Powell Service Association in Canada and the Baden-Powell Service Association in the United States, campaign hats are worn by both male and female Scouts and leaders. It is also used by Portuguese Boy Scouts.

== See also ==
- List of hat styles
- List of headgear
- List of headgear of the United States Army
