= Campaign cord =

Military decoration on hats

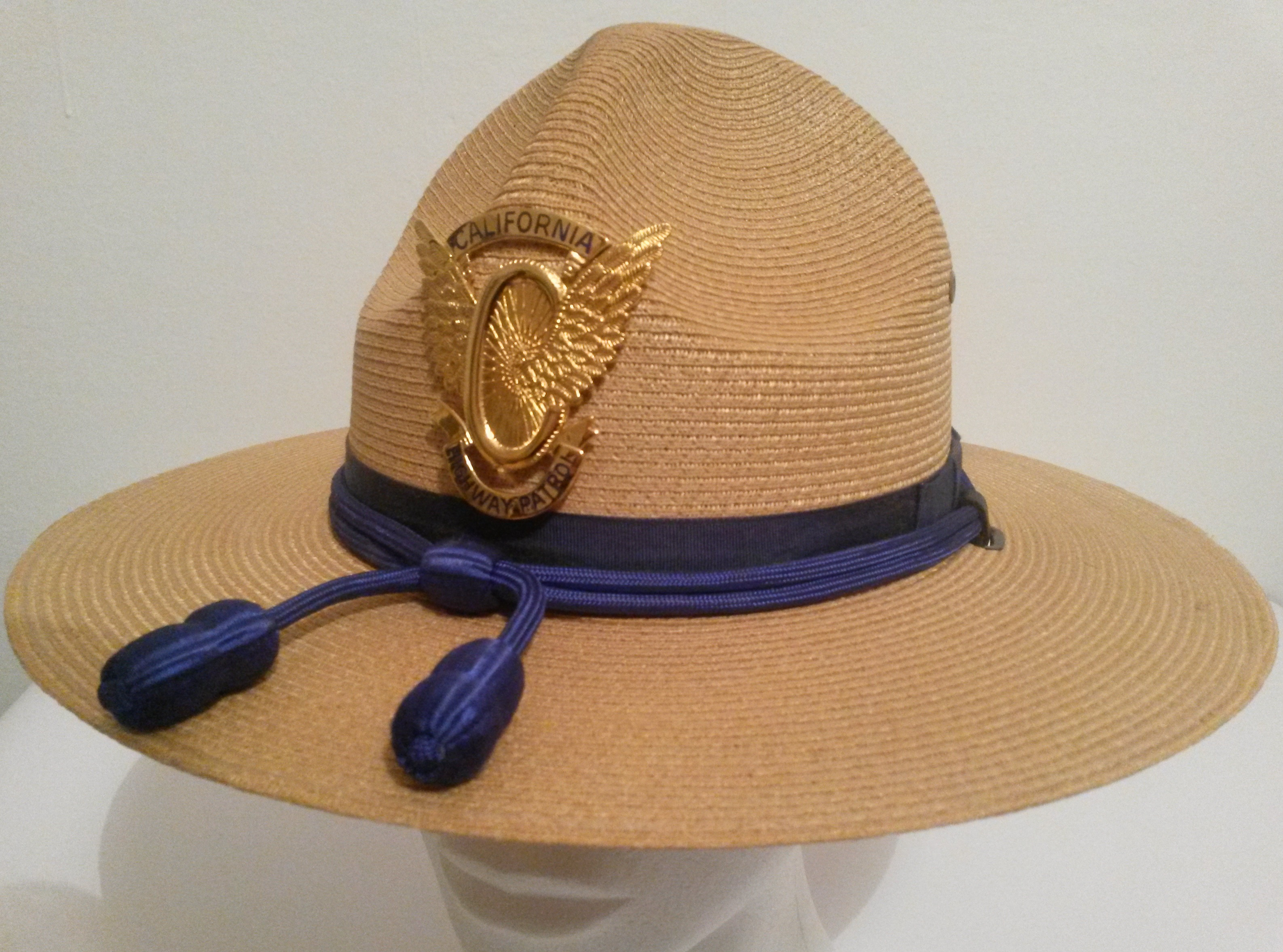
Campaign hat of the California Highway Patrol

Campaign cords or campaign hat cords are decorations generally worn around a variety of types of serviceman's hats to indicate station, unit, rank or history of service. They are generally used in the military or police services, and mostly in the United States.

Hat cords were initially used on slouch hats by the military. They were initially used by the US military in the 19th century. Some were of a single colour, others were of a blend of colours, and the patterns of the multi coloured cords could vary. While mainly ornamental and not serving any practical purpose, they could indicate information about the wearer.

Campaign cords are generally made up of three components; the cord itself, the keeper and the acorns. The cord may wrap around the hat twice, while the keeper keeps the cord together, and allows for it to be adjusted for a different size hat. The acorns are at the end of the cord and are mainly decoration, though they also stop the cord from slipping.

Historically, they have been worn by the US military commonly during the American Civil War and American Indian Wars, World War I, World War II to a lesser degree in the Pacific Theatre, and have been given to members of the 1st Cavalry Division since Vietnam. They are also worn by a number of US police, highway patrol, and sheriffs.

Pre World War One campaign cords tended to be of more elaborate construction, with two or three strands making up the one cord, each of a different colour. Post-WWI designs tend to be simpler in appearance and just have the one strand.

The colour of the cords could be indicative of the branch of the unit the wearer was with, and also denote rank. During the Civil War, enlisted soldiers would have solid color wool cords, while officers would have thread ones in often 2 different colors. Campaign cords are not commonly seen in use by any military units anymore besides the 1st Cavalry Division.

Campaign cords are worn on service hats worn by US sheriffs and mainly historically worn on campaign and slouch hats by the US military, while the police wear them with either traditional sheriff style, cattleman's or trooper, style hats, either made of straw or felt. They are worn by 39 of 49 state police agencies. (Note: Hawaii does not have a state police agency.) States that do not wear campaign cords atop their hats include Delaware, Maryland, Missouri, New Jersey, New Mexico, New York, North Dakota, Pennsylvania, Rhode Island, Texas, Virginia, and West Virginia.
