= Cord (sewing) =

Trim made by twisting yarn strands together

In sewing, cord is a trimming made by twisting or plying two or more strands of yarn together. Cord is used in a number of textile arts including dressmaking, upholstery, macramé, and couching. Soft cotton cord forms the filling for piping.

A type of cord, ordinarily being used as a decoration for a peaked cap.

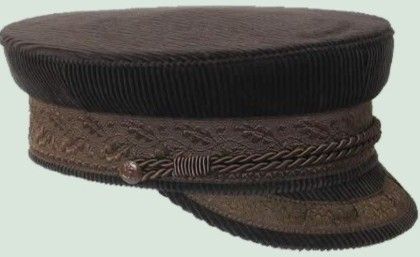
Application: A Prince Henry cap decorated with a type of hat cord

== See also ==
- Passementerie
