= Mariner's cap =

Cap of type originally often worn by seafarers

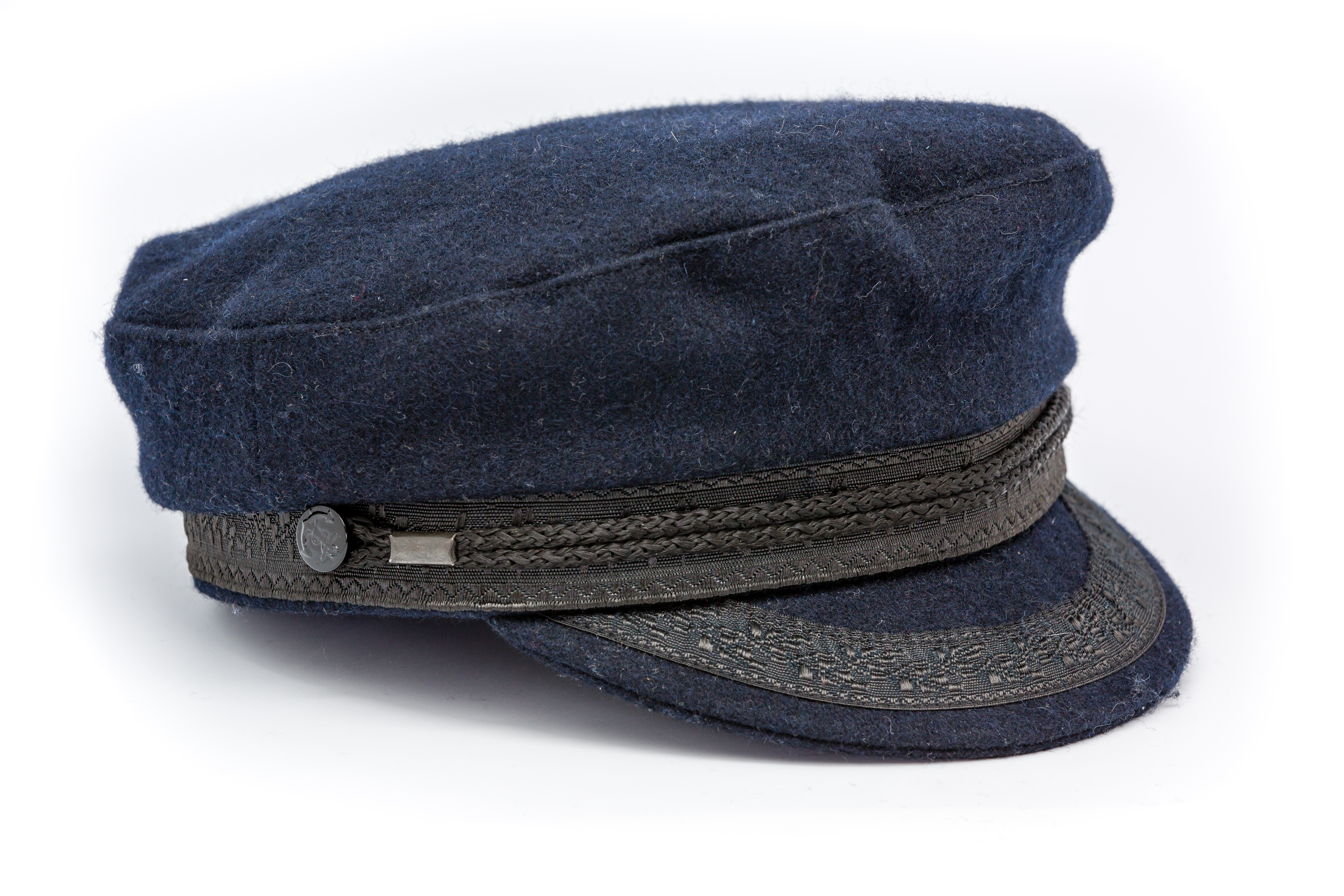
A Greek fisherman's cap

A mariner's cap, also called a skipper's cap, sailor's cap, Dutch Boy's cap, Greek cap, fiddler's cap, or breton cap is a peaked cap, usually made from black or navy blue wool felt, but also from corduroy or blue denim. Originally popular with seafarers, it is often associated with sailing and maritime settings, especially fishing, yachting and recreational sailing. It has sometimes become a fashion item in the West, for example being worn by John Lennon in the mid-1960s.

== Eastern Europe ==
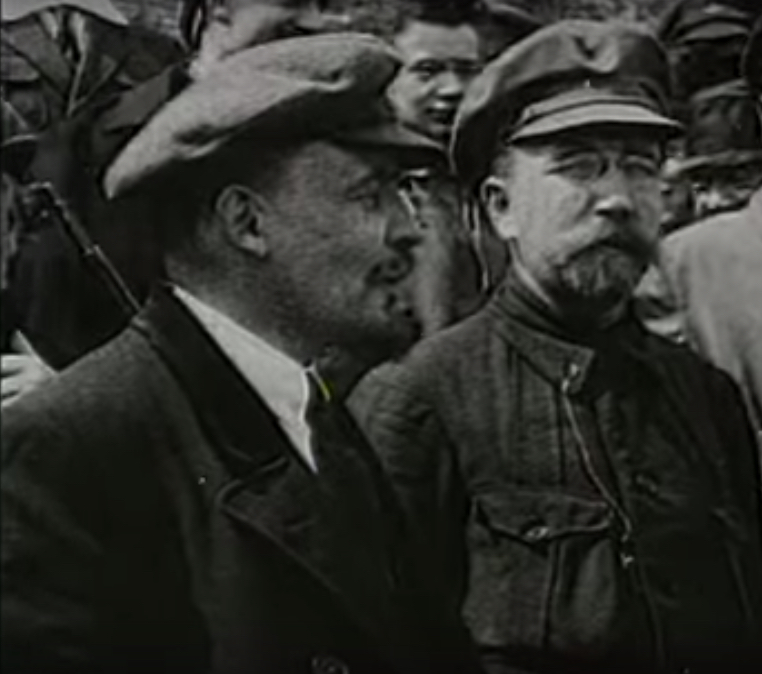
Lenin wearing his signature cap, 1920s

Caps of this type were introduced during the first quarter of the 19th century, as cheap and practical workwear for sailors and factory workers in Europe. These were particularly popular in Russia, especially among the urban Jewish community, and later gained the nickname fiddler cap due to their use by Topol as Tevye the Milkman in the film adaptation of Fiddler on the Roof.

A black version of this cap, with a narrow crown and a band embroidered with foliage, was known as a kasket or Hamburg cap (also see Central European caps below). It was introduced in response to the Tsarist authorities banning more traditional Jewish headwear in 19th-century Russia, and was later commonly seen on Kibbutz farmers in Israel during the 1950s. This hat was worn daily by Hasidic Jewish boys in Britain, Germany, Russia, Poland, and America from the early Victorian era until the mid 20th century, but in the present day it is generally restricted to Shabbat and other formal occasions.

Leading Old Bolsheviks including Vladimir Lenin, Leon Trotsky, Felix Dzerzhinsky, and Joseph Stalin also favored these caps during the Russian Revolution and Russian Civil War. Dark blue and army green variants with a red star badge later became part of the uniform for Great Patriotic War era political commissars along with a black leather reefer jacket. Similar caps were also worn by communists and socialists from other countries, including Chinese Communist Party chairman Mao Zedong and, more recently, former British Labour Party leader Jeremy Corbyn.

== Central Europe ==
Caps of this type were once popular with seafaring folk on Germany's North Sea and Baltic coastlines and various sub-types have emerged.

=== Elbsegler ===
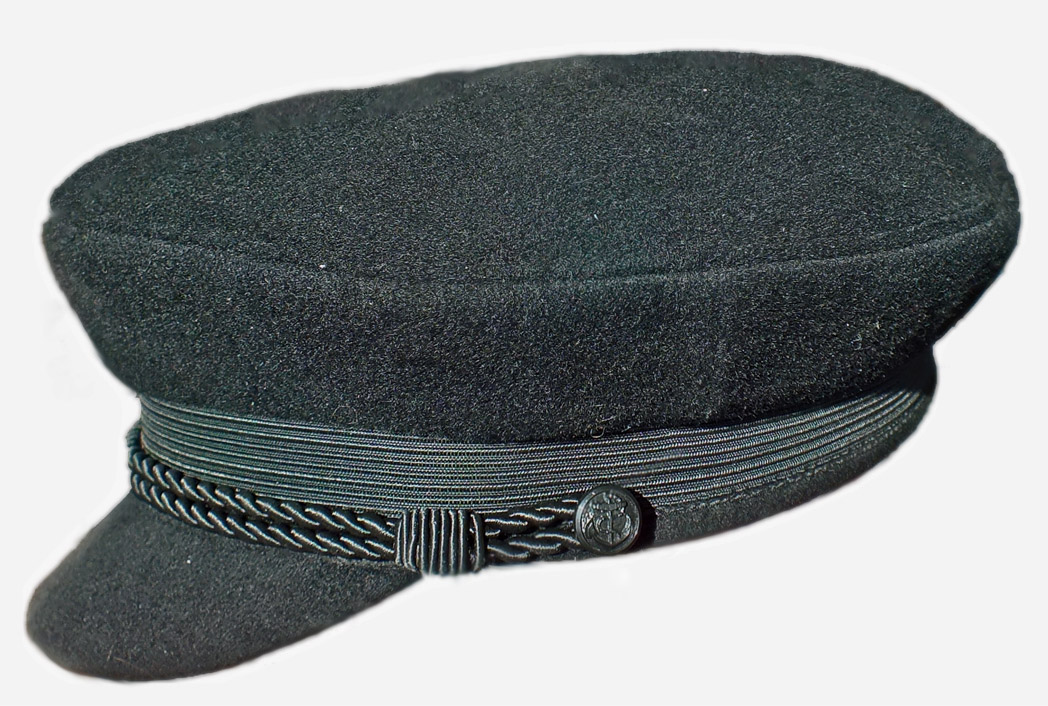
Elbsegler

The Elbsegler ("Elbe sailor") is a simple, low sailor's cap made of black or dark blue naval cloth. It has a border about three centimetres high and has leather storm straps at the front of the hat band. Nowadays, plastic is often used instead of patent leather.

=== Altstädter ===
A somewhat taller variant of the Elbsegler is the Altstädter ("Old Towner") (the hatband is higher). Instead of a storm strap above the peak, it has a twisted cord. The peak is decorated with oak leaves and referred to as a braided peak. The cap cord is also braided.

=== Fleetenkieker ===
The Fleetenkieker is similar to the Elbsegler above, but the crown is slightly larger and softer. This form of the mariner's cap is named after the workers on Hamburg's waterways, known as Fleetenkieker.

=== Heligoland pilot's cap ===
The Heligoland pilot's cap (Helgoländer Lotsenmütze) or Elbe pilot's cap (Elblotsenmütze or Elblotse), is specially made for Hamburg's harbour pilots. The hat has a high hat band and a small crown, the peak is decorated with oak leaves. The hat cord can be twisted or braided. The Elblotse is similar to the Prince Henry cap, and is therefore often confused with it, so that in the trade the Prince Henry cap is often marketed as the Schmidt cap (Schmidtmütze). (Note: German chancellor Helmut Schmidt often wore a Heligoland pilot's cap, which was often mistaken for a Prince Henry cap.) The Prince Henry cap in the Kiel City Museum, known as the original, is a hat of the imperial navy with a lacquered, not fabric crown, and is decorated with royal insignia (royal oak leaves, cocard and crown) and a storm strap, not a hat cord. Based on this, the military version would be a Prince Henry cap and the civilian variant, should be renamed an Elblotse. Otherwise, the two types of cap have similar proportions. The Elblotse was the trademark headgear of German Federal Minister and later Chancellor Helmut Schmidt, hence its nickname, the Schmidt cap.

== Western Europe ==
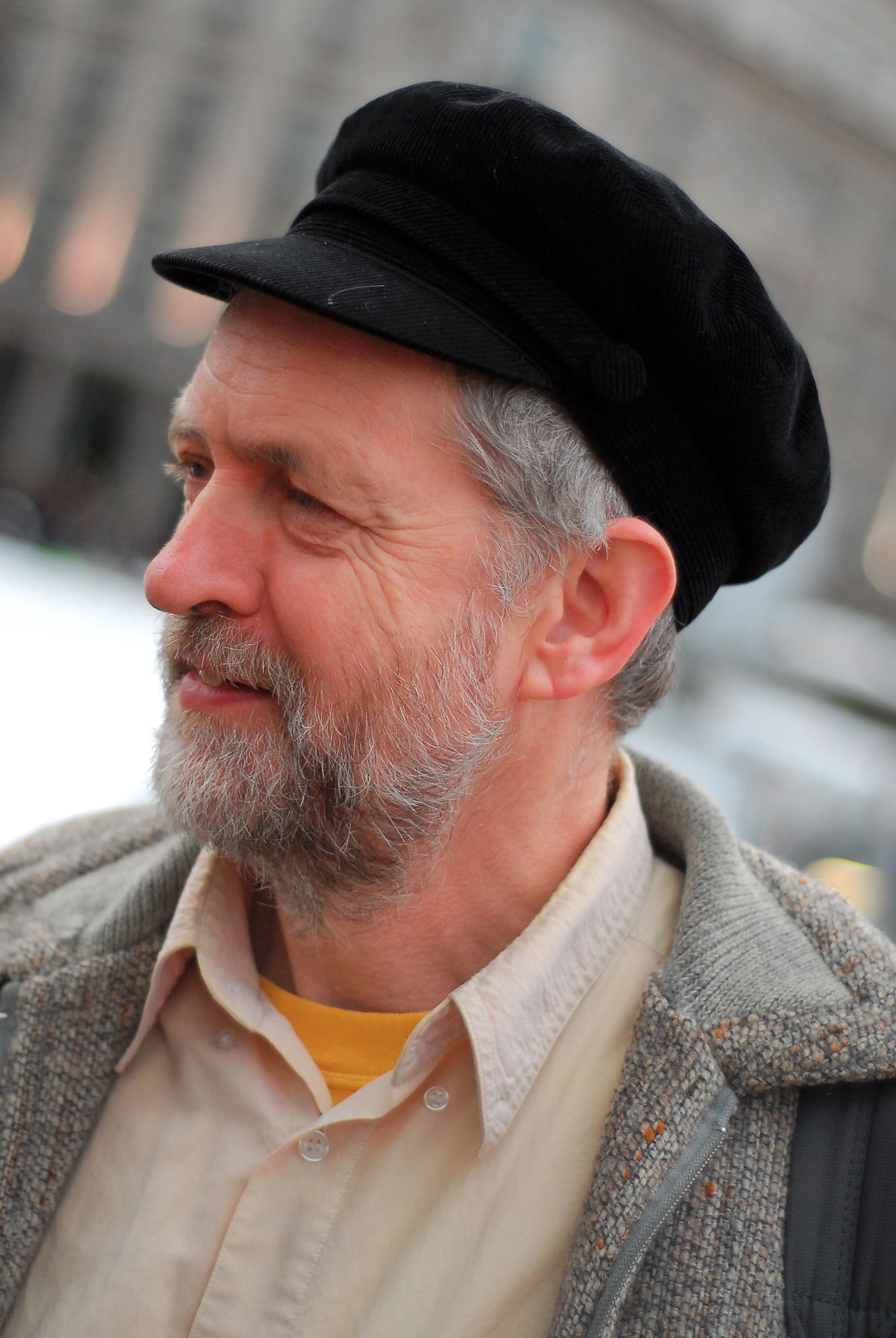
Jeremy Corbyn wearing a corduroy fiddler cap

By the 1880s, caps of this type were widespread in Greece and Turkey, and featured a decorative cord chinstrap, and a distinctive black embroidered ribbon on the peak. The traditional costume for many Greek coastal villagers, comprising the cap, roll neck sweater, loose trousers, and tall boots featured in the film adaptation of The Guns of Navarone, as the disguise for the British agents. Black or navy blue variants with a white crown known as Tellermützen were also commonly worn by university students in Germany, Denmark, and Sweden from the turn of the century until the present day.

== As workwear ==
Black or navy blue caps of this type served as workwear for merchant navy sailors throughout the 20th century. Caps with decorative gold braid, either in the standard navy blue or with a white top, were favored by the skippers of sailing yachts, motor boats, and other small pleasure craft. From the 1930s until the 1970s a waterproof version, known as a mechanic's cap, was worn with a blue boiler suit (coveralls) as part of the uniform for truckers, gas station employees and breakdown men. In the 1950 edition of Tintin and the Land of Black Gold, Thomson and Thompson wear these caps when they go undercover as Autocart mechanics.

== Modern use ==
During the 1950s, black leather variants of the Greek Fisherman's cap were popular among the Ton-up boy and Greaser subculture, due to their use by Marlon Brando in The Wild One. These appear in The Warriors as part of the uniform of the Rogues gang. Similar caps embellished with chains and metal studs were worn by many members of the 1970s black power movement as an alternative to the beret. At the same time, a knitted grey or black version, resembling a wool Rasta hat with a leather peak, gained popularity among some expatriate Jamaican Rastafarians in Britain and the US to accommodate their dreadlocks.

From the mid to late 1960s, the Greek Fisherman's cap became a desirable counterculture accessory for both sexes, due to its use by The Beatles during their US tour, and by folk musicians such as Bob Dylan, Woody Guthrie, and Donovan. The cap underwent a revival among young British hipster women during the late 1990s, and again during the 2010s due to a nostalgia for 1970s fashion.

== See also ==
- List of hat styles
- Flat cap
- Forage cap
- Kasket
- Peaked cap
- Prince Henry cap
- Sou'wester
