= Kurar (embroidery) =

Arabic embroidery

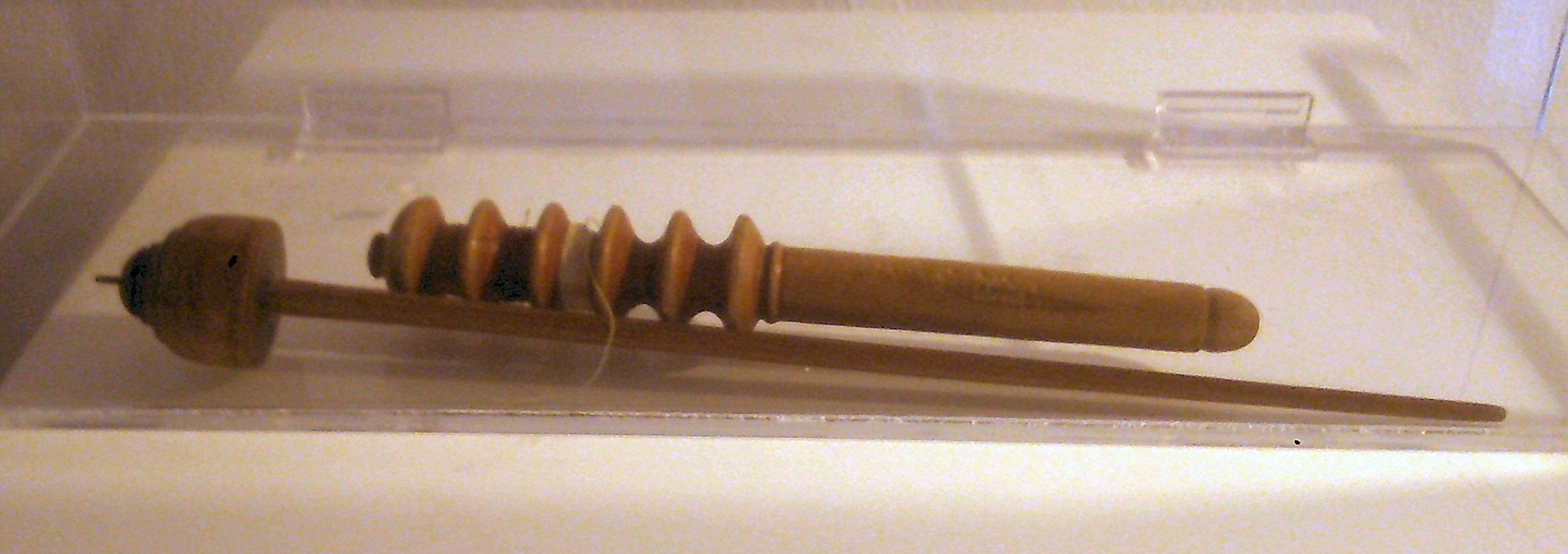
Tools used for creating kurar

Kurar (كورار, kūrār)) is a type of Arabic embroidery of weaving gold, silver and silk threads to create ribbons used to decorate clothing.

Each ribbon is made by a group of at least three women, the width of ribbon depending on the number of weavers. After preparing threads, a group of women (2 to 8), sitting in one row, weave threads through their fingers and crossing arms with next women. One woman, sitting opposite, collects threads and tightens them with a special needle, creating the ribbon.

When the whole length has been made, the ribbon is smoothed and polished with special "stones" and finally sewn to the rim of a dress. It takes about three days' work to make one length.

Contemporary art is vanishing and kurar ribbons are being replaced by industrial-made decorations.
