= Shakhrisabz Suzani =

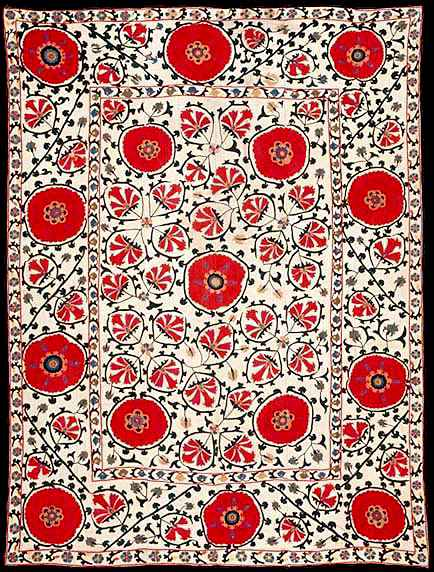
Shakhrisabz Suzani, circa 1850

Shakhrisabz Suzani is a type of Suzani textile made in Uzbekistan. The best-known and most valuable Shakhrisabz Suzanis were made in the 19th century, as a part of the bride's dowry. Shakhrisabz in an important market center in Qashqadaryo Region of Uzbekistan and the textiles are an important source of income.
