= Masnat =

Masnat is a piece of embroidered velvet cloth used by Royals of Mughal, Qutb Shahi, Asaf Jahis etc. It is also used during Muslim weddings. It is hand woven with shimmering zari on a velvet cloth. The rulers use to proclaim their orders sitting on a masnat.
