= Sheila Paine =

English expert on Islamic embroidery (1929–2022)

- In 2005, wearing Uzbek and Turkoman textiles
- Born: 29 September 1929; Balham, London, England
- Died: March 2022 (aged 92)
- Occupation: Travel writer
- Known for: Embroidered textile expert
- Notable work: The Afghan Amulet

Sheila Paine (29 September 1929 – March 2022) was an English expert on Islamic embroidery. She was known for her travel books including The Afghan Amulet, describing her efforts to find the "linen goddess", an embroidered motif found from Greece to central Asia, and the origins of an elaborately embroidered "Kohistan" dress she had seen in a dealer's shop in London. Her work was exhibited at the Pitt Rivers Museum, Oxford.

== Biography ==
=== Early life ===
Sheila Paine was born on 29 September 1929 in Balham to Barbara Sykes and the quantity surveyor Edgar Thorpe. She was educated at Nonsuch Grammar School and London's Lycée Français. She did a foundation course at Hammersmith College of Art. She then broke off her education, travelling to South Africa to work as a translator and meeting a mining engineer, Leslie Paine. They returned to England, married in 1953, and had four children. She resumed her education at Oxford Polytechnic (now Oxford Brookes University), eventually becoming a teacher of modern languages there. She began to collect English samplers, her first venture into the study of textiles.

=== Travels in search of embroidery ===
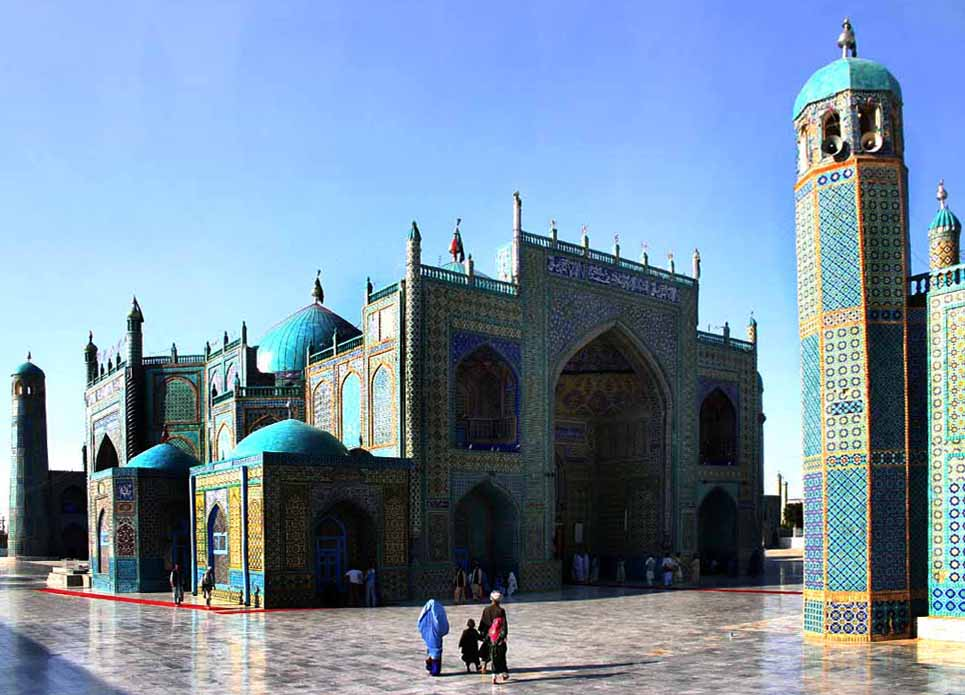
Paine travelled throughout central Asia, visiting places such as Mazar-i-Sharif, with its historic blue mosque.

Leslie Paine was killed on Turkish Airlines Flight 981 when it crashed near Paris in 1974. Remaking her life, Sheila Paine began to travel to "the remotest of places" such as the Hindu Kush, the Karakoram Mountains, Eritrea, Somalia, Iran, or Siberia. She habitually travelled with 5 kilograms of baggage and a bottle of vodka; to save weight, she went so far as to cut the handles of her toothbrushes in half. She returned from each trip with carefully-labelled pieces of Islamic and other embroidery. She was often given textiles by women she met: "Headbands, a child's cap or a jerkin would be thrust into her hands. Payment was often refused". She curated her collections meticulously, recording where she had acquired each item, and analysing how it was made.

In the late 1980s, she saw a richly-embroidered dress in a textile dealer's shop in London. It was described as coming from 'Kohistan' ("Land of the mountains"), which could have been a place in Afghanistan, Iran, Pakistan, or Tajikistan. It was decorated with embroidered suns, coins, broken zip-fasteners, a triangular amulet of pieces of shell and beads, and no fewer than 647 triangles of cloth sewn on to the skirt's frill. Fascinated, she decided to discover where the dress had come from and what the embroidered symbols, especially the amulet, meant.

Many of her journeys were in search of the "linen goddess", a female figure who appears in embroidered textiles from the Greek islands to the Himalayas. These resulted in her trilogy of travel books, The Afghan Amulet in 1994, The Golden Horde in 1997, and The Linen Goddess in 2003. Coming to the attention of museum authorities in charge of textile collections, she wrote books for the British Museum on textiles from India and from Pakistan. An exhibition of her photographs of her textile journeys, Embroidered Visions: Photographs of Central Asia and the Middle East by Sheila Paine, was held at the Pitt Rivers Museum, Oxford, from November 2016 to April 2017. This was accompanied by an illustrated guide Embroidered Visions: Photographs by Sheila Paine, written by Paine, Katherine Clough, and Philip N. Grover. An exhibition of textiles from her journeys, Stitch of a Symbol, was held at the Pitt Rivers Museum from August 2016 to February 2017.

She stopped travelling at the age of 80, when she fractured her back. Unable to find an institution to buy her textile collection, she sold it at auction at Dreweatts in 2008. The British Museum acquired some of the pieces. She died aged 92 in March 2022.

== Works ==
- Paine, Sheila (1989). Chikan Embroidery: the floral whitework of India. Shire Publications. ISBN 0-7478-0009-X.
- ——— (1995) [1990]. Embroidered Textiles. Traditional Patterns from Five Continents. Thames & Hudson. ISBN 978-0-500-27823-9.
- ——— (1995) [1994]. The Afghan Amulet: travels from the Hindu Kush to Razgrad. Penguin Books. ISBN 978-0-14-017930-9. OCLC 60121423.
- ——— (2004). Amulets: a world of secret powers, charms and magic. London: Thames & Hudson. ISBN 978-0-500-28510-7. OCLC 56645600.
