= Couching =

Technique of embroidery stitch

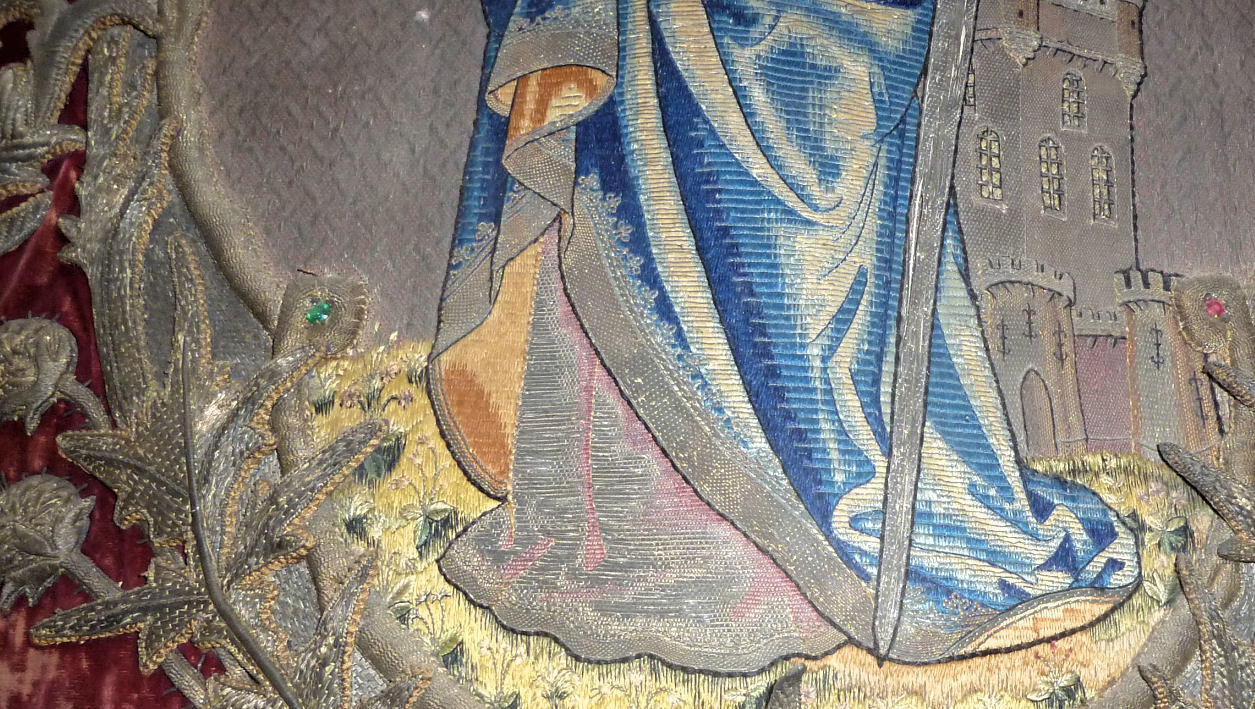
Banner with couching, Belgium, 19th century

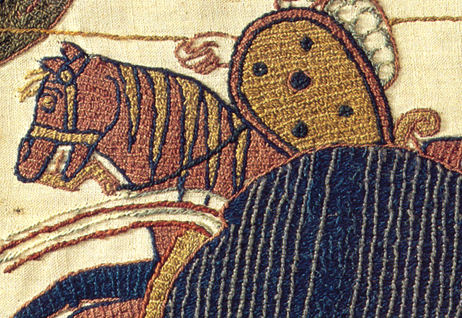
Detail of the Bayeux Tapestry showing fillings in laid work

In embroidery, couching and laid work are techniques in which yarn or other materials are laid across the surface of the ground fabric and fastened in place with small stitches of the same or a different yarn.

The couching threads may be either the same color as the laid threads or a contrasting color. When couching threads contrast with laid threads, patterns may be worked in the couching stitches.

== Applications ==
Laid work is one of two techniques used in the Bayeux Tapestry, an embroidered cloth probably dating to the later 1070s. (The other technique is stem stitch.)

Underside couching of metal thread was characteristic of earlier Opus Anglicanum in Medieval England and was also used historically in Sicily and rarely in other parts of Italy and France.

Couching is also characteristic of Japanese metal-thread embroidery and Central Asian suzani work. Another example of Islamic embroidery is the strong tradition of couching stitch in Palestine. Production centered on Bethlehem and its two neighbouring villages Beit Sahour and Beit Jalla; it was used for wedding dresses and formal wear.

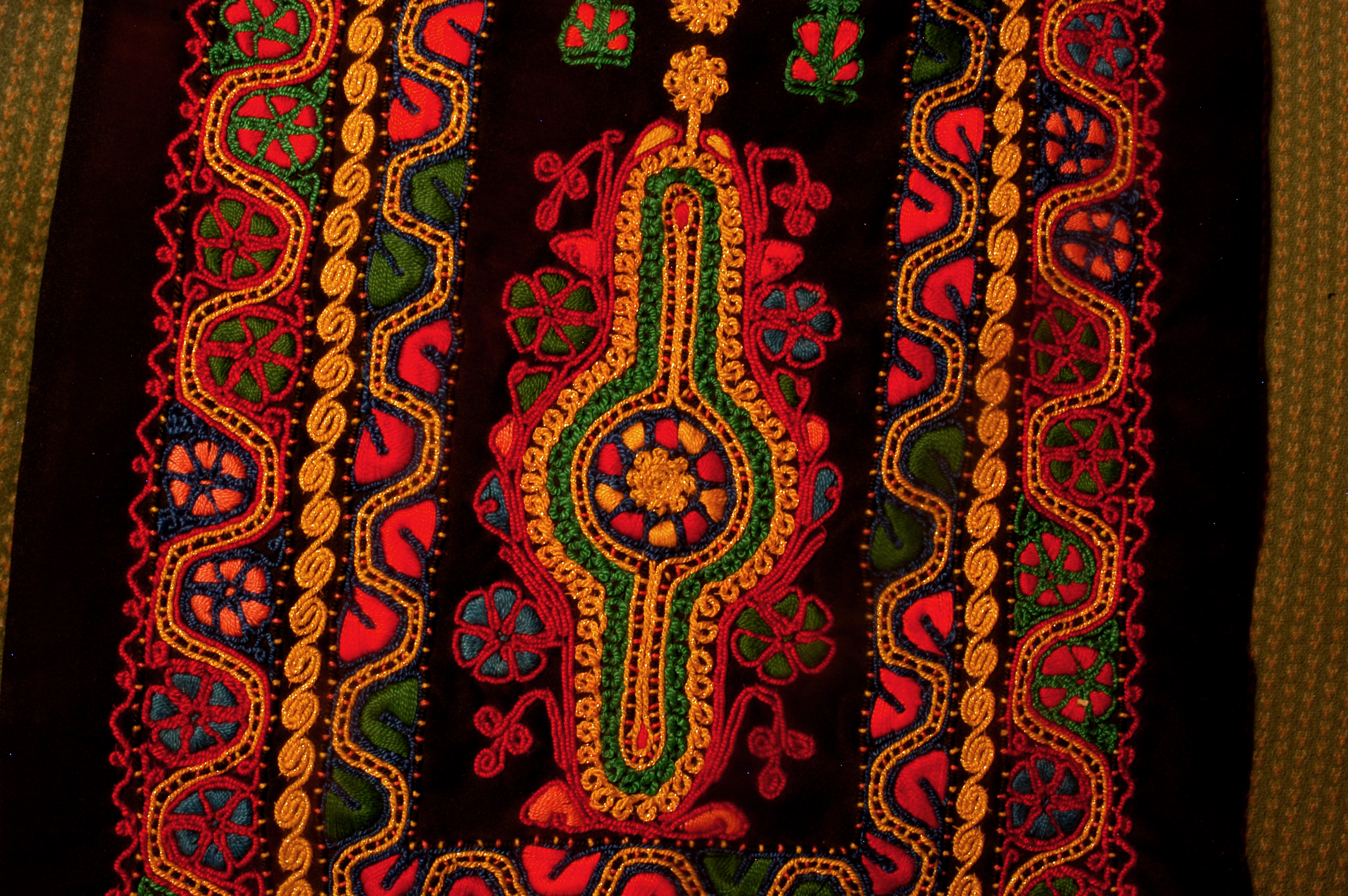
Couching stitch from Beit Jalla. 2006.

== Variants ==
- In couching, one or more threads are laid on the fabric surface and sewn to the fabric at regular intervals.
- In couched filling, threads are laid on the surface in a trellis pattern and sewn to the fabric at the intersections.
- In laid work or Bayeux stitch, threads are laid side-by-side to fill a shape, then held in place with a thread at right angles to the laid threads. This crossing thread is then couched to the fabric to hold the laid threads in place.
- In Bokhara couching or Bokhara stitch, the couched threads are held in place with many tiny crossing stitches, which may be aligned from row to row to produce patterns.
- In Roumanian stitch, long satin stitches are each held in place with a small diagonal stitch made in the center.
- In Roumanian couching, bundles of laid threads are held in place with Roumanian stitches.
- In underside couching, a heavy couching thread (historically, a stout linen) is brought up from the wrong side of the work, looped over the laid thread, and returned to the wrong side. The couching thread is then given a sharp pull which draws a small loop of laid thread through to the wrong side of the fabric. Underside couching has the advantages that the couching thread is completely concealed from the front and is not subject to wear.

== Gallery ==
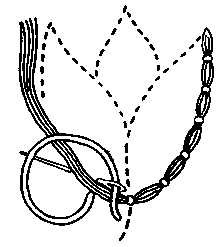
Couching

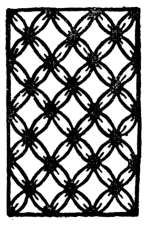
Couched filling

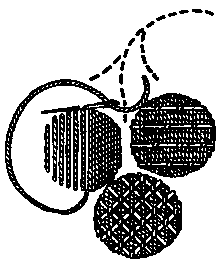
Laid work

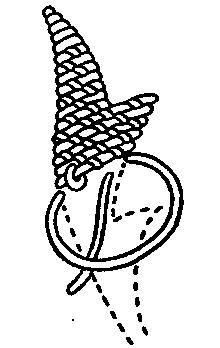
Bokhara couching

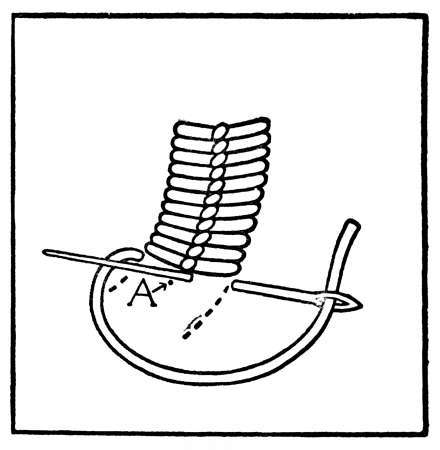
Roumanian stitch

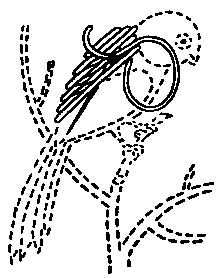
Roumanian couching

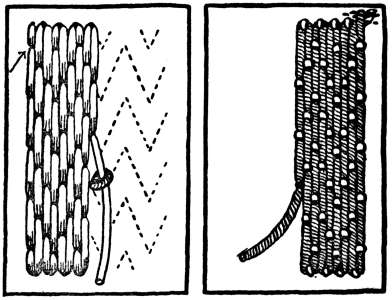
Underside couching, front (left) and back (right)
