= Islamic embroidery =

Embroidery styles of the Islamic world

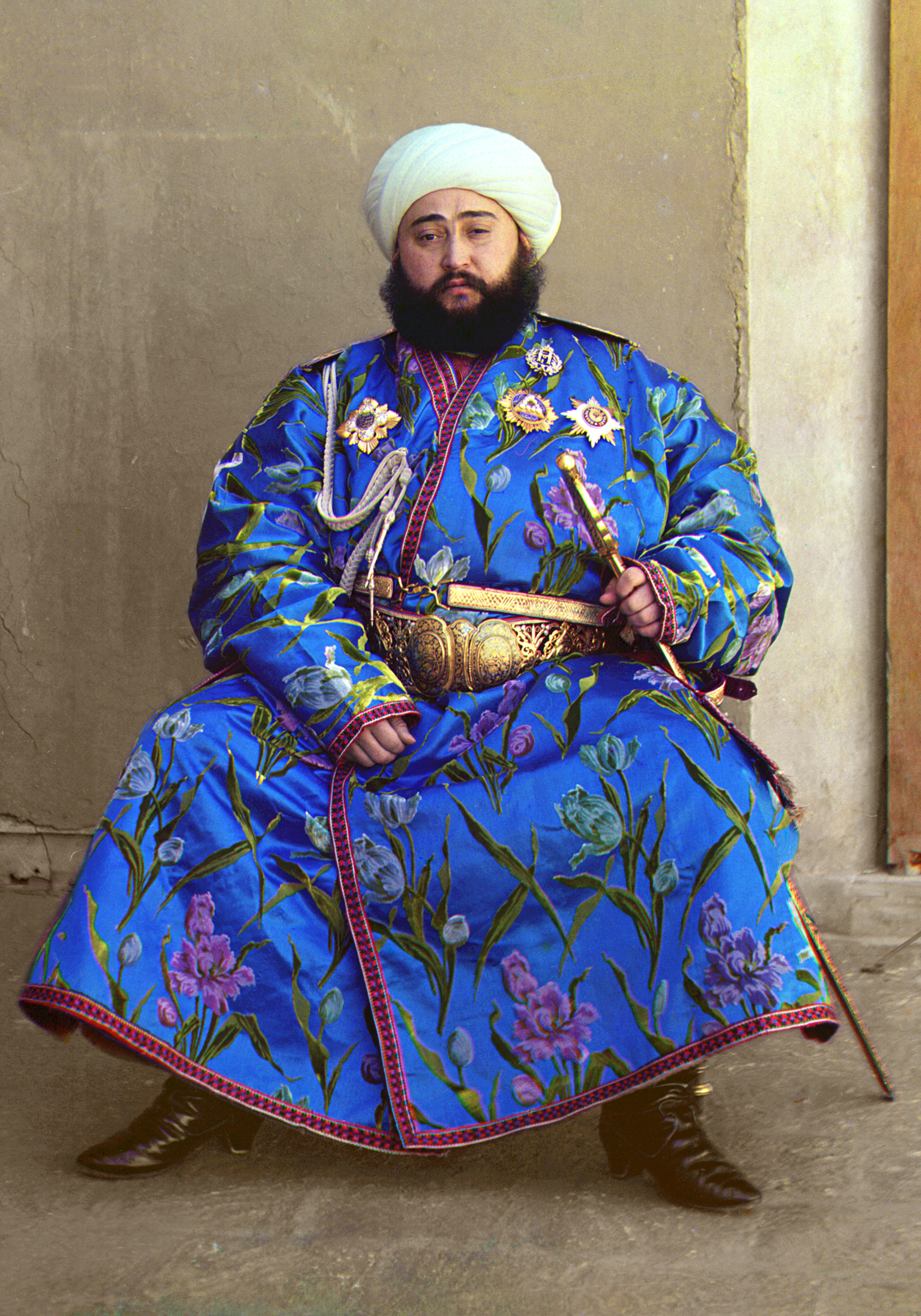
Mohammed Alim Khan in embroidered clothes, photographed by Prokudin-Gorsky in 1911

Embroidery was an important art in the Islamic world from the beginning of Islam until the Industrial Revolution disrupted traditional practices via mechanization.

== Overview ==
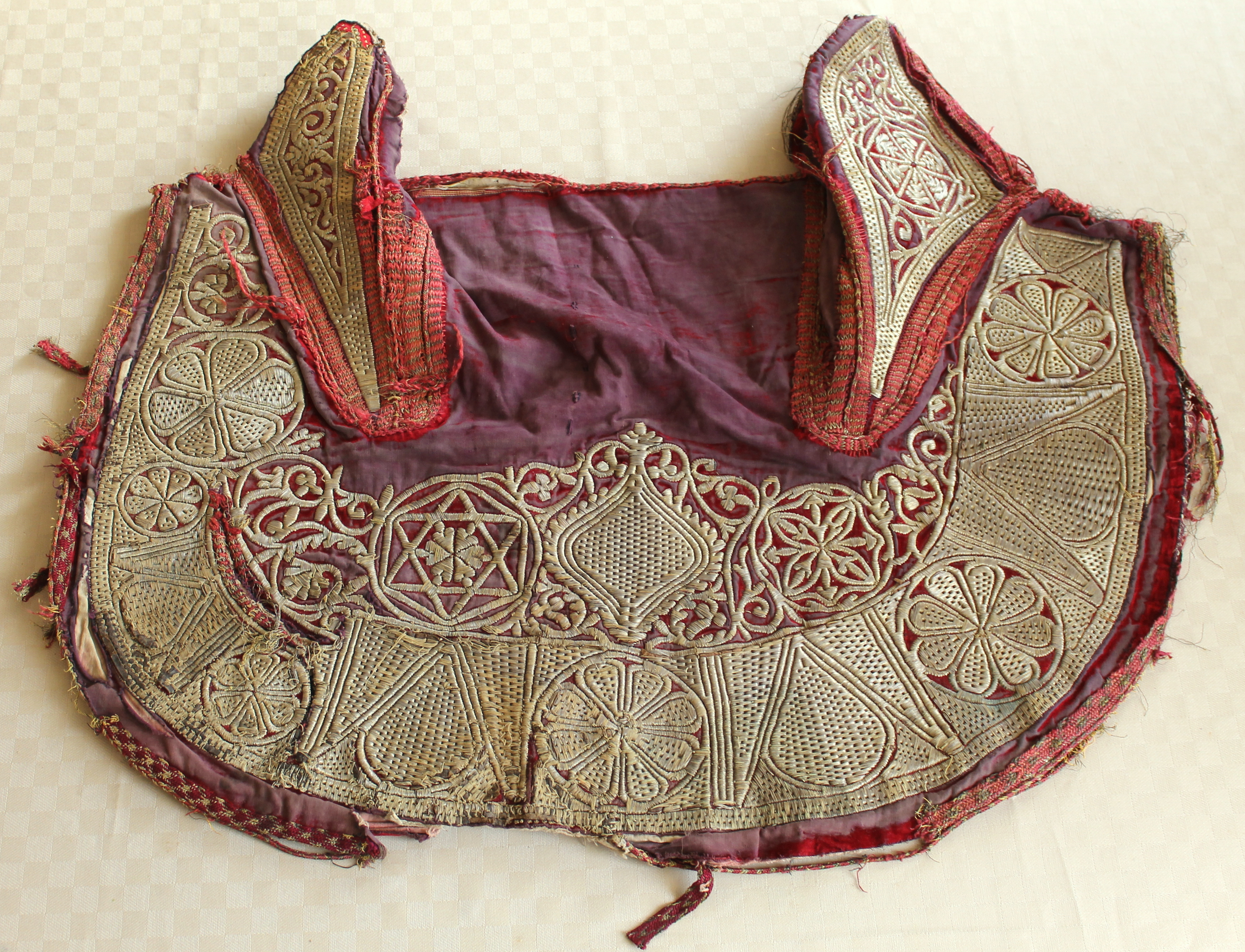
Horse cover embroidery embroidered with silver thread. Fez, Morocco. 18th–19th century

Early Islam took over societies where the embroidery of clothes for both sexes and other textiles was very popular. Both the Byzantine and Persian Sasanian empires used clothing embroidered with designs including rather large human figures as well as animals, with effects comparable to those of modern teeshirts. The exterior of the Kaaba in Mecca was already before Islam "covered on the outside with multi-coloured textile hangings", very likely including embroidery as their modern Islamic equivalents often have. Muhammad objected to animal designs, perhaps embroidered, he saw on cushions when visiting his wife Aisha's house. (Note: Aisha reported in a hadith "I bought a cushion having on it pictures (of animals). When Allah's Apostle saw it, he stood at the door and did not enter. I noticed the sign of disapproval on his face and said, "O Allah's Apostle! I repent to Allah and His Apostle. What sin have I committed?' Allah's Apostle said. "What is this cushion?" I said, "I have bought it for you so that you may sit on it and recline on it." Allah's Apostle said, "The makers of these pictures will be punished on the Day of Resurrection, and it will be said to them, 'Give life to what you have created (i.e., these pictures).' " The Prophet added, "The Angels of (Mercy) do not enter a house in which there are pictures (of animals)." Muhammad al-Bukhari) These types of design largely disappeared under Islam, though plant-based motifs often remained acceptable.

The 17th century Turkish traveller Evliya Çelebi called embroidery the "craft of the two hands". Because it was a sign of high social status in Muslim societies, it had long been widely popular. In cities such as Damascus, Cairo and Istanbul, embroidery was visible on handkerchiefs, uniforms, flags, calligraphy, shoes, robes, tunics, horse trappings, slippers, sheaths, pouches, covers, and even on leather belts. Craftsmen embroidered items with gold and silver thread. Embroidery cottage industries, some employing over 800 people, grew to supply these items.

In the 16th century, in the reign of the Mughal Emperor Akbar, his chronicler Abu al-Fazl ibn Mubarak wrote in the famous Ain-i-Akbari:

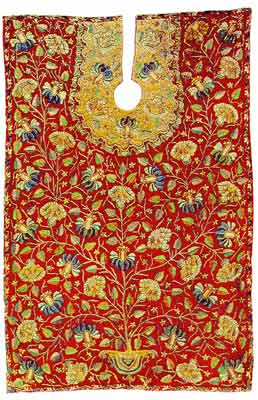
Ottoman barber's apron. Embroidery with silver and silk thread on wool. 18th century

His majesty [Akbar] pays much attention to various stuffs; hence Irani, Ottoman, and Mongolian articles of wear are in much abundance especially textiles embroidered in the patterns of Nakshi, Saadi, Chikhan, Ari, Zardozi, Wastli, Gota and Kohra. The imperial workshops in the towns of Lahore, Agra, Fatehpur and Ahmedabad turn out many masterpieces of workmanship in fabrics, and the figures and patterns, knots and variety of fashions which now prevail astonish even the most experienced travellers. Taste for fine material has since become general, and the drapery of embroidered fabrics used at feasts surpasses every description.

Embroidery offered symbolic protection for the most highly valued objects, including babies, household possessions and things with religious significance. When in the 16th and 17th centuries in Turkey, men wore turbans as a sign of Islam, they placed their turbans under embroidered cloths.

== Techniques ==
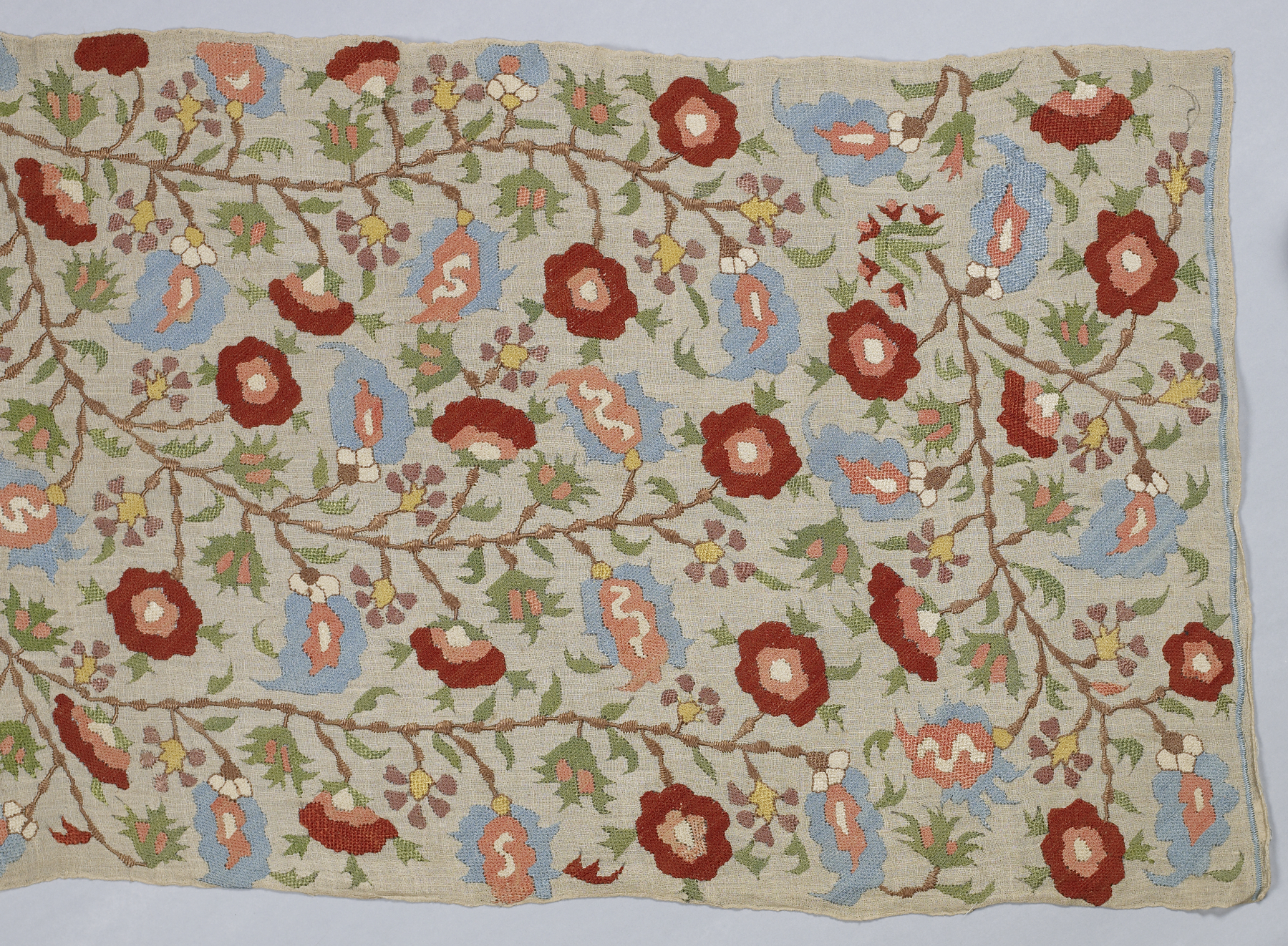
Turkish Mirror Cover with floral ornament based on Ottoman ceramics. A superstition warned against looking into a mirror at night. 18th century

A wide variety of embroidery techniques were used across the Islamic world, with an equally broad range of materials.

Uighur women embroider felt skull caps, for use on their own or as the base for a turban.

In Morocco and Tunisia, satin stitch was used for items such as decorative curtains and mirror covers. A form of satin stitch present in the Bedouin societies of the Arabian Peninsula, sometimes referred to as khiyat al madrassa ("school embroidery"), was used for furnishings. Prior to the stitching process, a shape was drawn onto the fabric by a skilled artist. Designs incorporating natural themes such as birds or flowers were most common.

Surface satin stitch, worked only on the upper surface, is a more economical but looser technique, vulnerable to wear, and so is mainly used for special occasions. In Punjab, Phulkari (flower work) shawls were however daily wear for women in the countryside, while special ones, bagh, were completely covered with embroidery and were made by maternal grandmothers for their granddaughters' weddings.

Chain stitch, which is adaptable and relatively easy to create, was used in Persia for Resht embroidery, with densely worked flowers and arabesques on felted woollen cloths. A type of embroidery similar to heavy chain stitch, known as kurar, was previously used by Bedouin to create dresses for both men and women. It required four people, with each person carrying four threads which were either of varying colours or silver and gold.

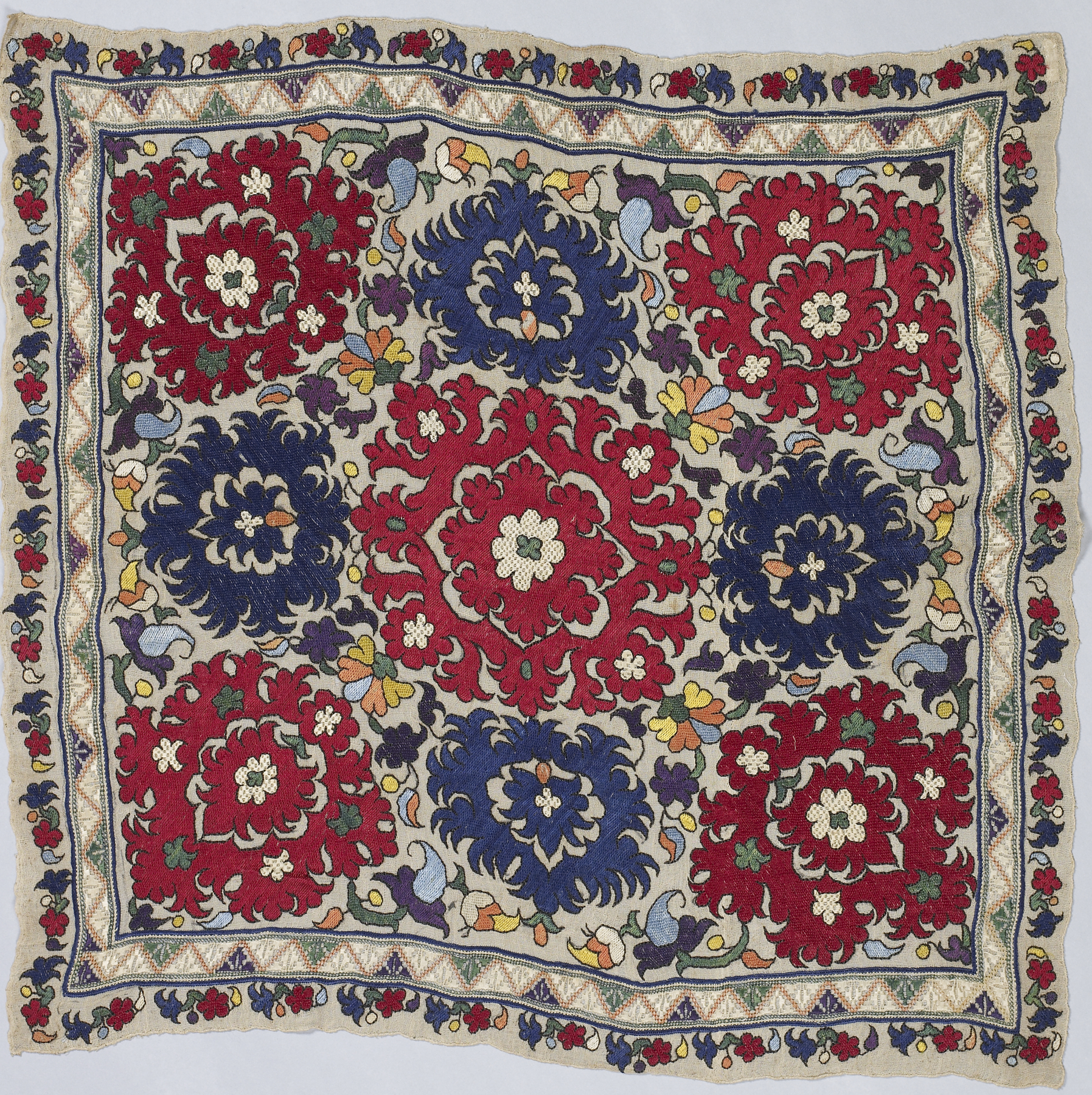
Algerian turban cover. Silk embroidery on linen. 18th century

Cross stitch was used across the Middle East in Syria, Jordan, Palestine and Sinai to work wedding dresses with bold embroidery in red, with triangular amulets or carnation flowers on a black background.

Another widely used technique, Herringbone stitch, was used in Afghanistan to embroider bridegroom's smocks with raised bands of red, green or white stitchery on a white background.

Couching, the stitching of decorative cord on to the surface of a fabric, was used widely across the Islamic world. In Afghanistan, a velvet dress could be worked in military style with gold-coloured threads on the front, sleeves and hem. Chieftains in Montenegro could wear robes heavily couched in gold thread. In Palestine, dresses could be heavily worked in vertical panels with couched threads of metal and cotton. In Syria, jackets were couched with stylised flowers and trees. In the Northwest Frontier of Pakistan, waistcoats were sewn with a combination of appliqué panels and couched metal braid.

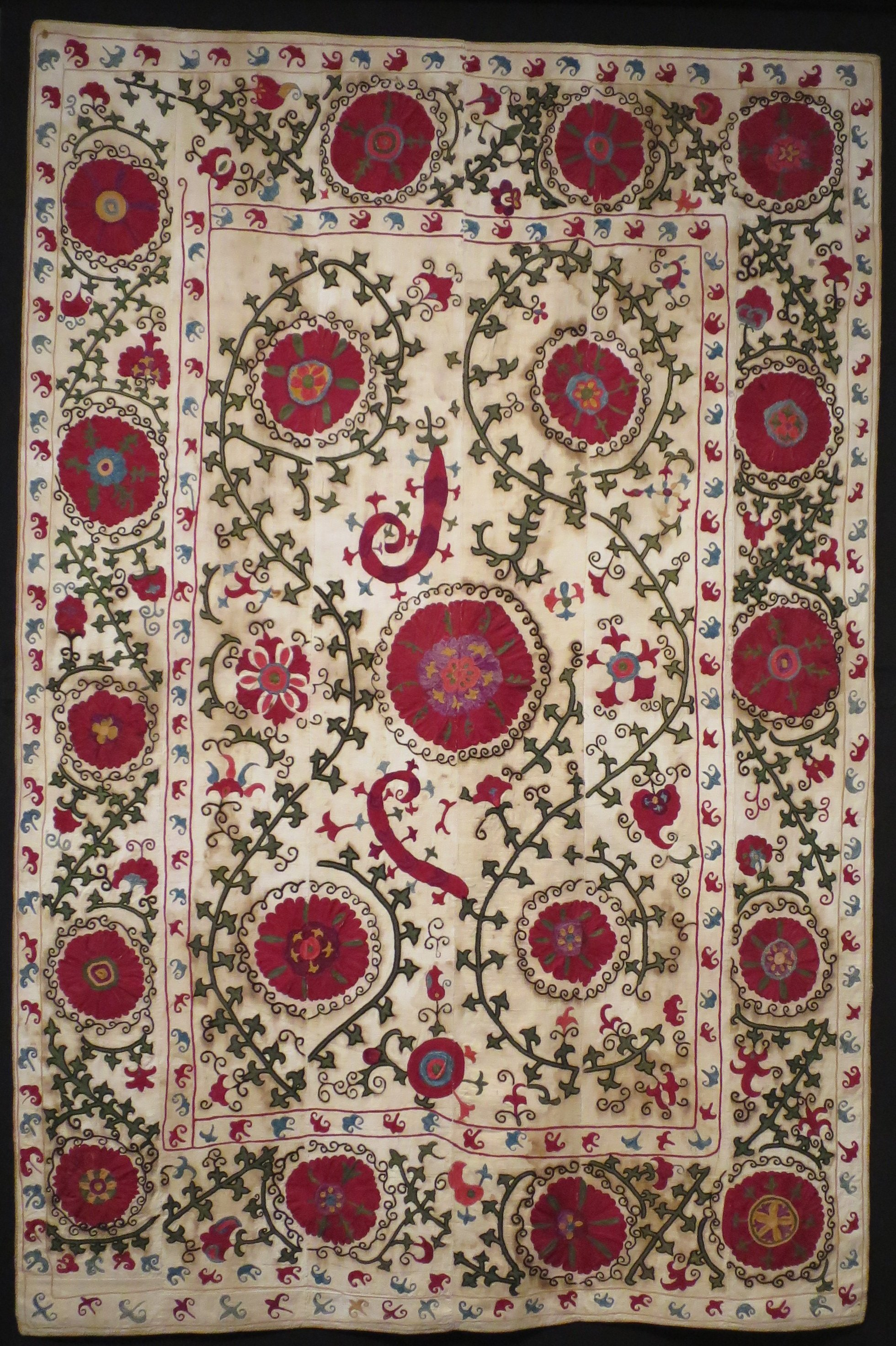
Embroidered Suzani from Bukhara, Uzbekistan. Cotton with silk threads. Late 19th century

In Central Asia, Bokhara couching using continuous thread creates spectacular suzanis, hangings for wedding halls and bridal beds. Carnation and pomegranate motifs symbolised fertility. The technique was also used in Afghanistan and Uzbekistan for horse blankets and brazier covers.

Blanket stitch, buttonhole stitch, and eyelet stitch all had the original function of strengthening the edges of textiles subject to daily wear and tear, but were adapted for decorative purposes. In North Africa and the Middle East, eyelet stitch is made using a spoked wheel pattern of stitches, or in the Algerian form without an enclosing circle. In Turkmenistan, hook and tulip motifs could be worked in buttonhole stitch. In Afghanistan, men's shirts could be embroidered with herringbone and buttonhole stitches in white silk on white cotton, in elaborate arabesques.

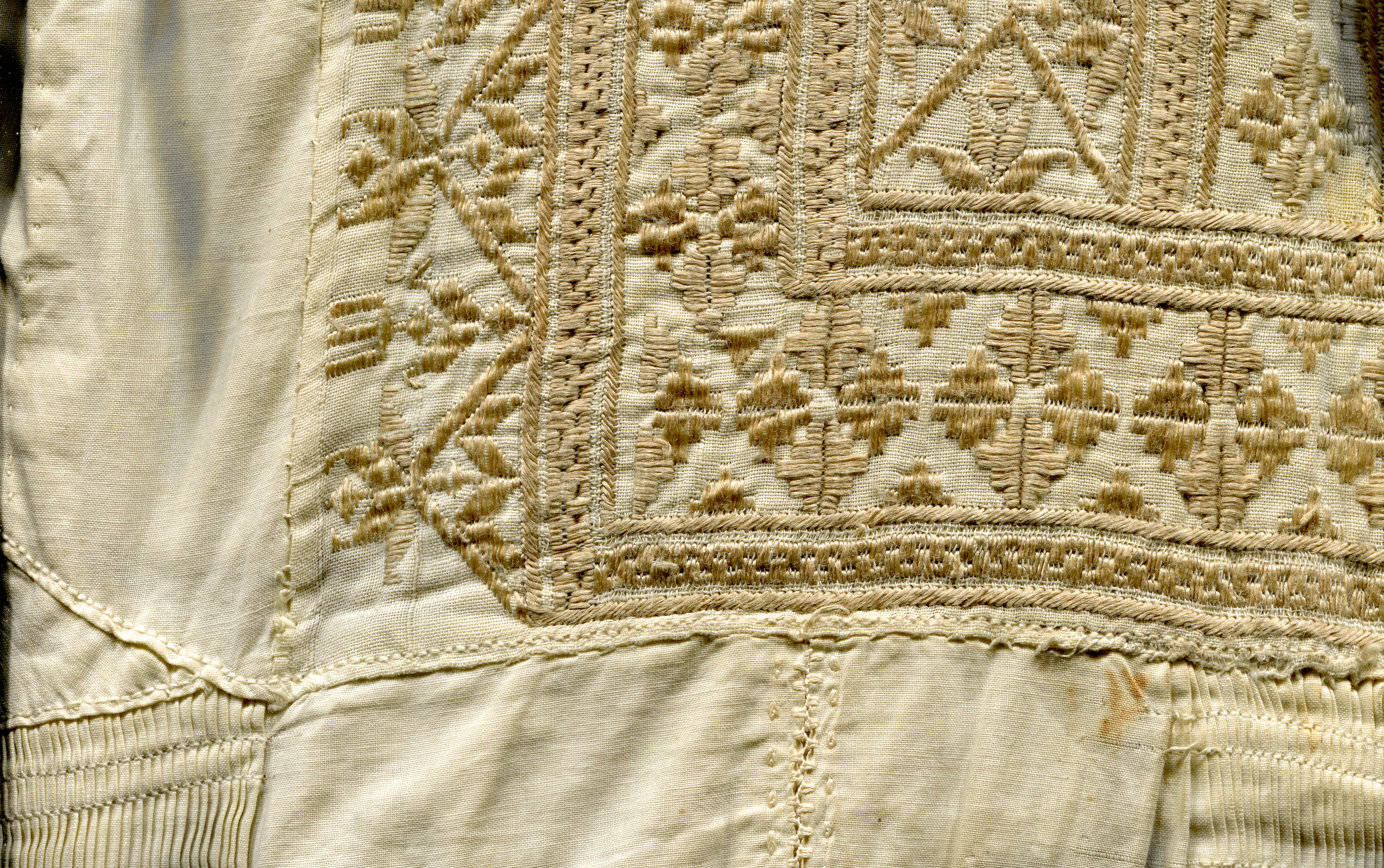
Detail of man's white satin stitch embroidered smock from Afghanistan. Mid 20th century.

Whitework, the use of white thread on a white ground, covers a variety of techniques and materials, and is used in different forms around the world. In Algeria, Kabyle women could wear whitework dresses. In Ghazni, Afghanistan, men's smocks could be embroidered with geometric whitework stitching embellished with small circular mirrors.

Needlepoint (canvaswork) was used for brightly coloured geometrical Hazara dress panels in Afghanistan.

Smocking was used for men's smocks in Nuristan in the Hindu Kush, the black stitching pulling the cloth into vertical bands with zigzag, crisscross and other simple geometric patterns.

Tambour work, a rapid form of embroidery using a fine ari hook instead of a needle, was one of the techniques used around Bokhara in Uzbekistan for suzanis.

== Symbolism ==
Embroidered motifs often carry symbolic meaning. A widespread symbol across the Islamic world (and also often found on Islamic carpets) is the tree of life, signifying birth, growth to maturity, death and rebirth. It can be shown in many forms, such as a deliberately stylised tree, sometimes flanked by pairs of birds or fruits such as pomegranates, or a vase of flowers.

== Textiles of sacred sites ==
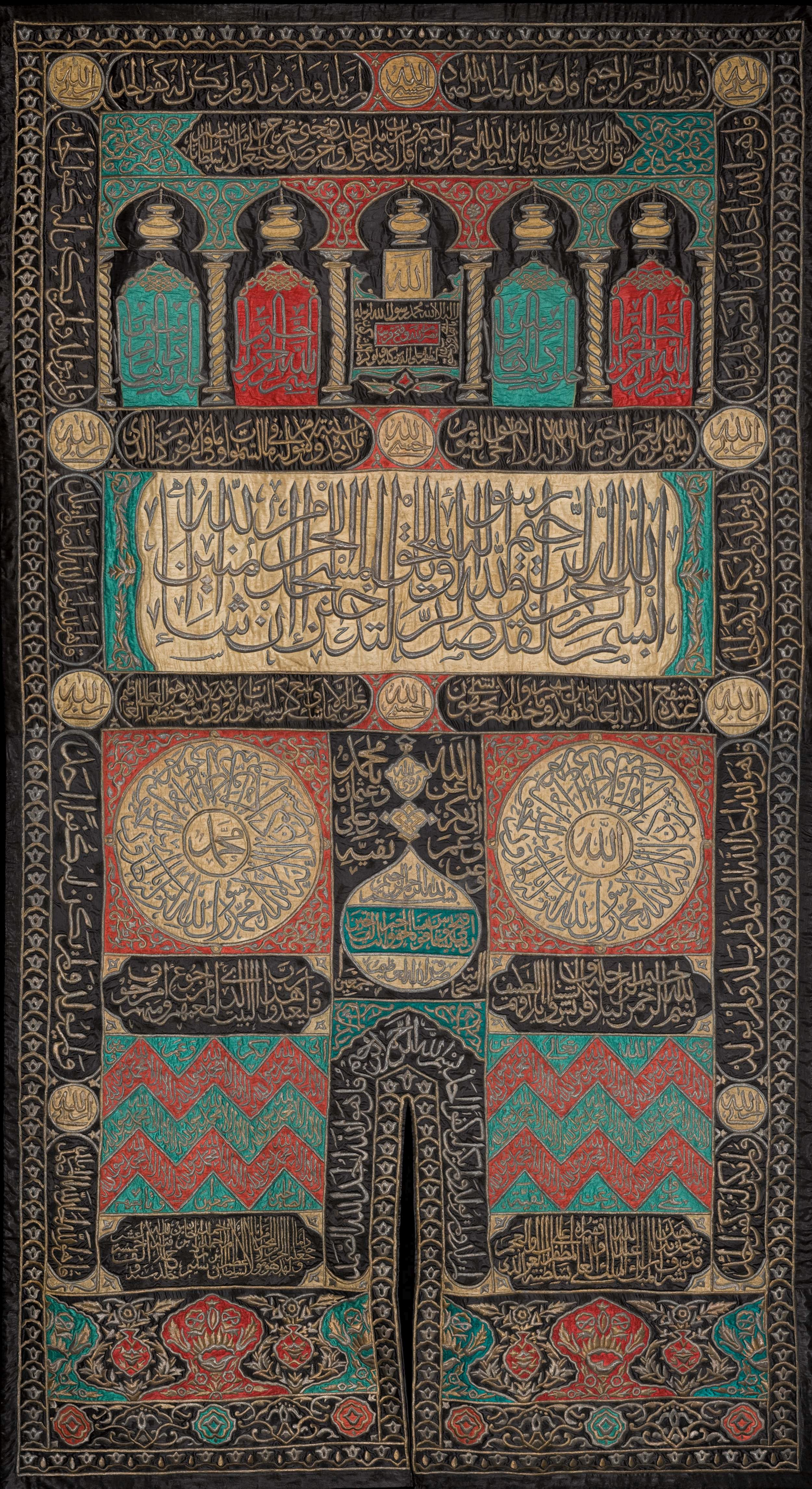
Sitara for the door of the Kaaba, 1606

Embroidered textiles are features of the holy sanctuaries of Islam: the Great Mosque in Mecca and the Prophet's Mosque in Medina. They are regularly replaced, in traditions that go back centuries. Replacing the textiles is one of the privileges of the Custodian of the Two Holy Mosques, a title adopted by Mamluk, Ottoman, and Saudi Arabian rulers. The covering of the Kaaba, known as the kiswah, includes a sitara (a richly decorated curtain over the door) and hizam (a belt that wraps around the building). The earliest known sitara was made in 1544 in Egypt and the earliest Ottoman hizam was made for Selim II in the late 16th century. The basic designs of the sitara and hizam have changed little, although the embroidery in gold and silver wire have become more ornate over time. The Maqam Ibrahim (Station of Abraham) is a small square stone near the Kaaba which, according to Islamic tradition, bears the footprint of Abraham. It used to be housed in a structure with its own sitara that was replaced annually.

Averaging 5.75 metres (18.9 ft) by 3.5 metres (11 ft), the sitara for the door of the Kaaba is assembled by sewing together four separate textile panels; the hizam is similarly assembled from eight panels (two for each wall of the Kaaba). A dedicated workshop, the Dar al-Kiswa, was created in Cairo in 1817, which at its peak employed 100 craftsmen to make the kiswa and other textiles for Mecca and Medina. Since 1962 they have been produced at a workshop in Mecca. The colours used have changed in different eras. The present colour scheme for the sitara of the Kaaba, in use since the early 20th century, is gold and white embroidery on a black background. A modern kiswah uses 670 kilograms (1,480 lb) of silk and is embroidered with 15 kilograms (33 lb) of gold thread. These inscriptions include verses from the Quran and supplications to Allah, as well as the names of the rulers who commissioned the textiles. The shahada (the Islamic declaration of faith) is another text used commonly.

== Decline ==
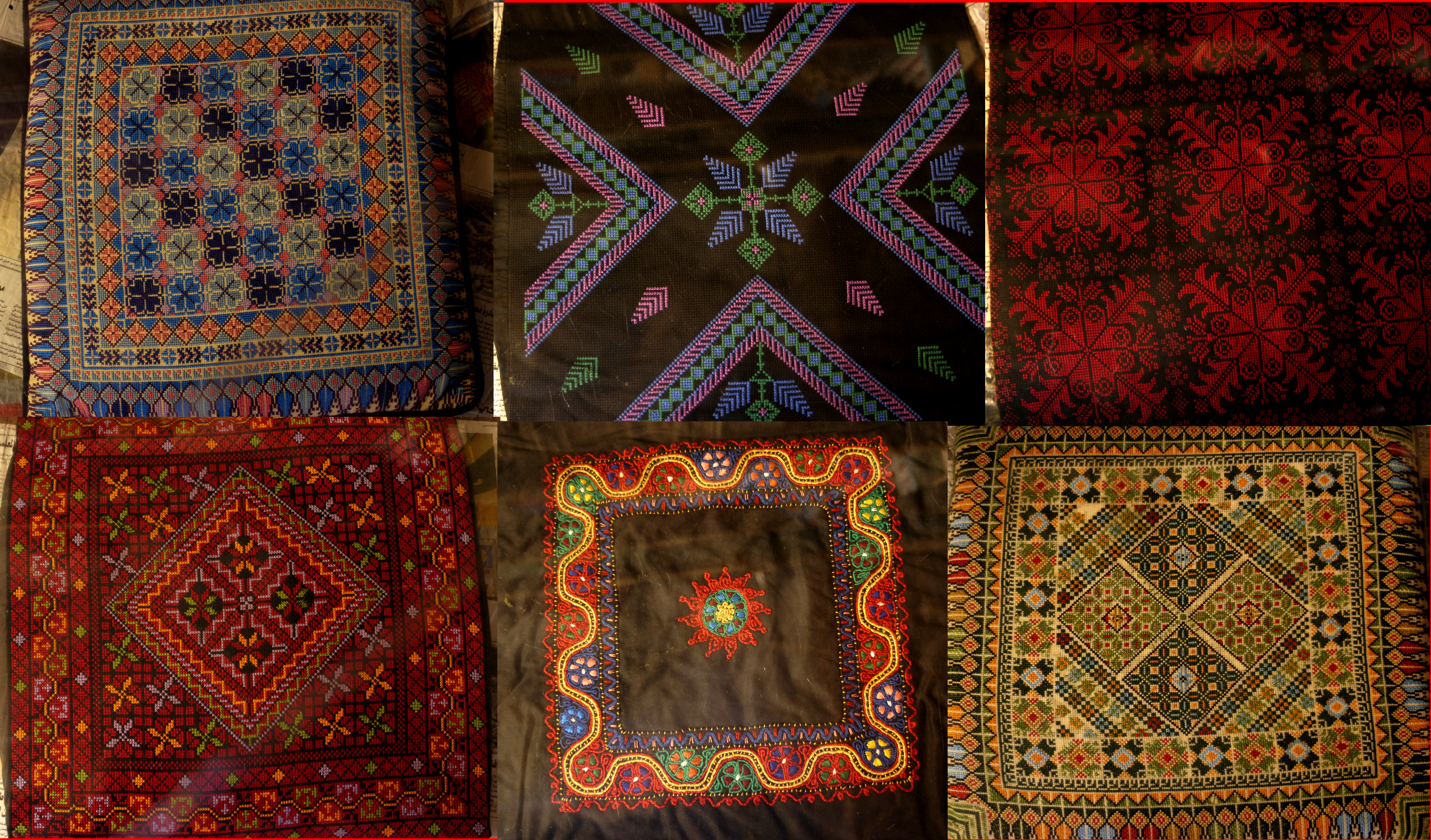
Modern Palestinian cross-stitch cushions. From top left, clockwise: Gaza, Ramallah, Ramallah, Nablus, Beit Jalla, Bethlehem.

Embroidery was important in traditional cultures across the Islamic world. The Industrial Revolution made colourful clothing available more quickly and more cheaply, displacing crafts such as embroidery.

For example, the masnat (enthronement) cloths of Hyderabad, India were made of velvet, hand-embroidered with glittering copper thread forming gold- and silver-coloured flowers (formerly actually of those metals). These were made for Mughal emperors and other rulers, and also for the bride and groom to sit on during weddings in Hyderabad. The technique derived from Turkey and Persia. A masnat takes between twelve days and two months to make, and can cost up to 100,000 rupees. Business declined during the 20th century, as fewer traditional cloths were ordered. Wedding providers offered a masnat as part of their service; machine-made cloths edged out handmade ones. As of 2012, only a few elderly masnat makers remained.

The embroidery researcher Sheila Paine concludes her book Embroidered Textiles by explaining that

once the social context no longer exists and the beliefs and fears that embroidery promoted or deflected no longer torment, once linen is no longer painfully cultivated, spun and woven, sheep are no longer the mainstay of life and exotic silks from other lands a precious luxury – then traditional embroidery is doomed.

Among the causes of embroidery's decline are politics and economics, but Paine suggests that the most powerful factor has been the education of young women. Embroidery is no longer the only way the young woman in Turkey or Baluchistan can secure her future by winning a husband; instead, she can aspire to a university degree and a career of her own. Paine argues that attempts to reinstate traditional embroidery, as with schools set up in Istanbul and Salamanca, will inevitably fail once the necessary social environment that gave handmade artefacts meaning has collapsed. In future, she states, embroidery will carry individual meaning, as in the West, and perhaps new social purposes, as with the politically significant embroidered dresses of the Palestinians.

== See also ==
- Zardozi
