= Kashket =

Cap worn mainly by Hasidic Jewish children

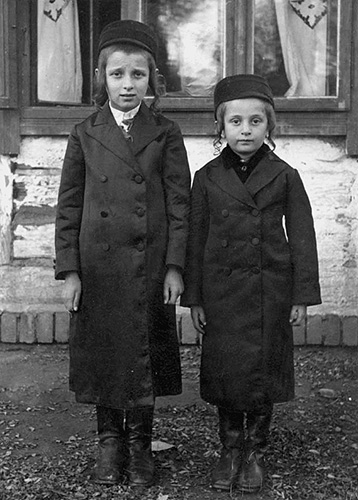
Two Jewish children wearing kashkets

A kashket (Yiddish: קאַשקעט, from Polish kaszkiet and Ukrainian кашкет; from French casquette 'cap'; also known as a kashkettel or kasket) is a cap, usually made of felt, worn mainly by Hasidic Jewish children as an alternative to the kippah. It has a crown, a band and a peak. From the beginning of the 20th century until World War II, many Russian Jews and Polish Jews wore this cap as part of their everyday dress.

== Origins ==
Caps of this type were introduced during the early 19th century, as cheap and practical workwear for sailors and factory workers in Europe. These became popular among the urban Russian Jewish community in response to the Tsarist authorities banning more traditional Jewish headwear.

By the mid-19th century, the earlier workman's cap had evolved into the kashket recognisable today, with a narrow crown and a band embroidered with foliage similar to that on a military kepi. Around this time, it gained the alternative name of Hamburg cap due to the large number of Russian Jewish immigrants using the Northern German ports as a stopping point on the route to America. This hat was worn daily by Hasidic Jewish boys in Britain, Germany, Russia, Poland, and America from the Victorian era until the mid-20th century, but in the present day it is generally restricted to Shabbat and other formal occasions.

== In popular culture ==
In the animated film An American Tail, the main character's (Fievel) trademark hat, a blue kashket, is given to him by his father.

Kashkets were worn by Zero Mostel and Topol as Tevye the Milkman in the stage and film adaptations of Fiddler on the Roof.

American-Jewish rapper BLP Kosher famously wears a customized kashket, altered to accommodate his wick-style peyos.

== See also ==
- Scott Kashket (born 1996), England, striker for Wycombe Wanderers
- Mariner's cap
- Peaked cap
- List of hat styles
