= Prince Henry cap =

German peaked cap

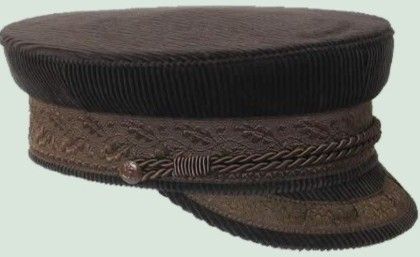
Prince Henry corduroy cap

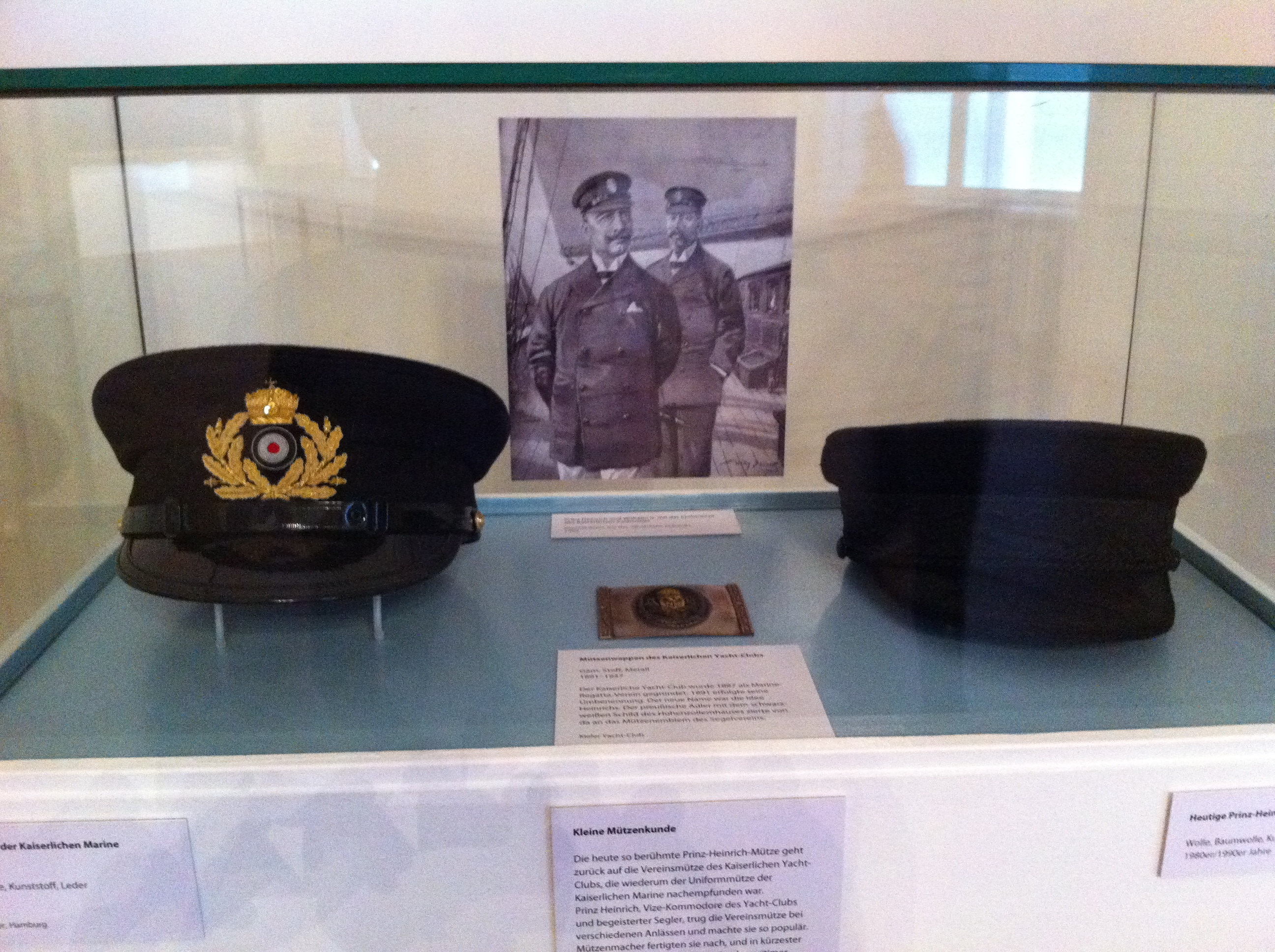
Prince Henry's original cap (left) in Kiel city museum

The Prince Henry cap (German: Prinz-Heinrich-Mütze), sometimes Prince Henry hat or Prince Heinrich cap, is a peaked cap which is named after the Imperial German Grand Admiral Prince Henry of Prussia (1862–1929), the younger brother of Kaiser Wilhelm II ("Kaiser Bill"). The Prince Henry cap goes back to the headgear of the Imperial Yacht Club, which in turn was based on the uniform cap of the German Imperial Navy.

The body of the cap used to be made of pure wool, today it is often replaced by synthetic fibre components; corduroy has also been a common material since the 1950s. Oak leaf embroidery as well as braided or twisted hat cord usually adorn the hat band and peak. The colours of the caps usually range from dark blue to gray to black. Other primary colours, such as brown and green, are produced less frequently. The characteristics of the Prince Henry cap that distinguish it from other similar caps such as e.g. the mariner's cap, are the high hat band and the stiff, relatively small crown. Its diameter is only slightly larger than that of the hat band and is approximately the same size on all sides.

== Examples ==
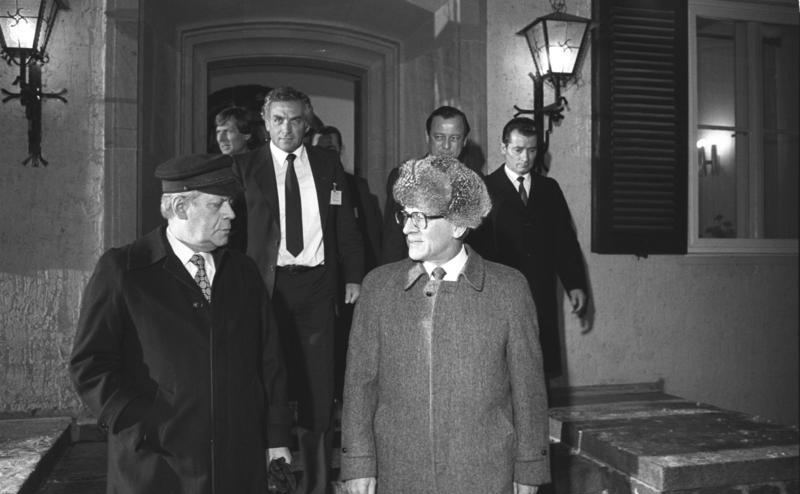
Helmut Schmidt and Erich Honecker with typical headgear. Schmidt wears a Helgoland pilot's cap, which is very similar to a Prince Henry cap.

The German chancellor, Helmut Schmidt, made the cap popular in Germany because he wore a Hanseatic hat, actually a Heligoland pilot's cap from Hamburg, which was often called a Prince Henry cap because of its similar shape.

== See also ==
- List of hat styles
