= Suzani (textile) =

Embroidered tribal textile made in Central Asia and Iran

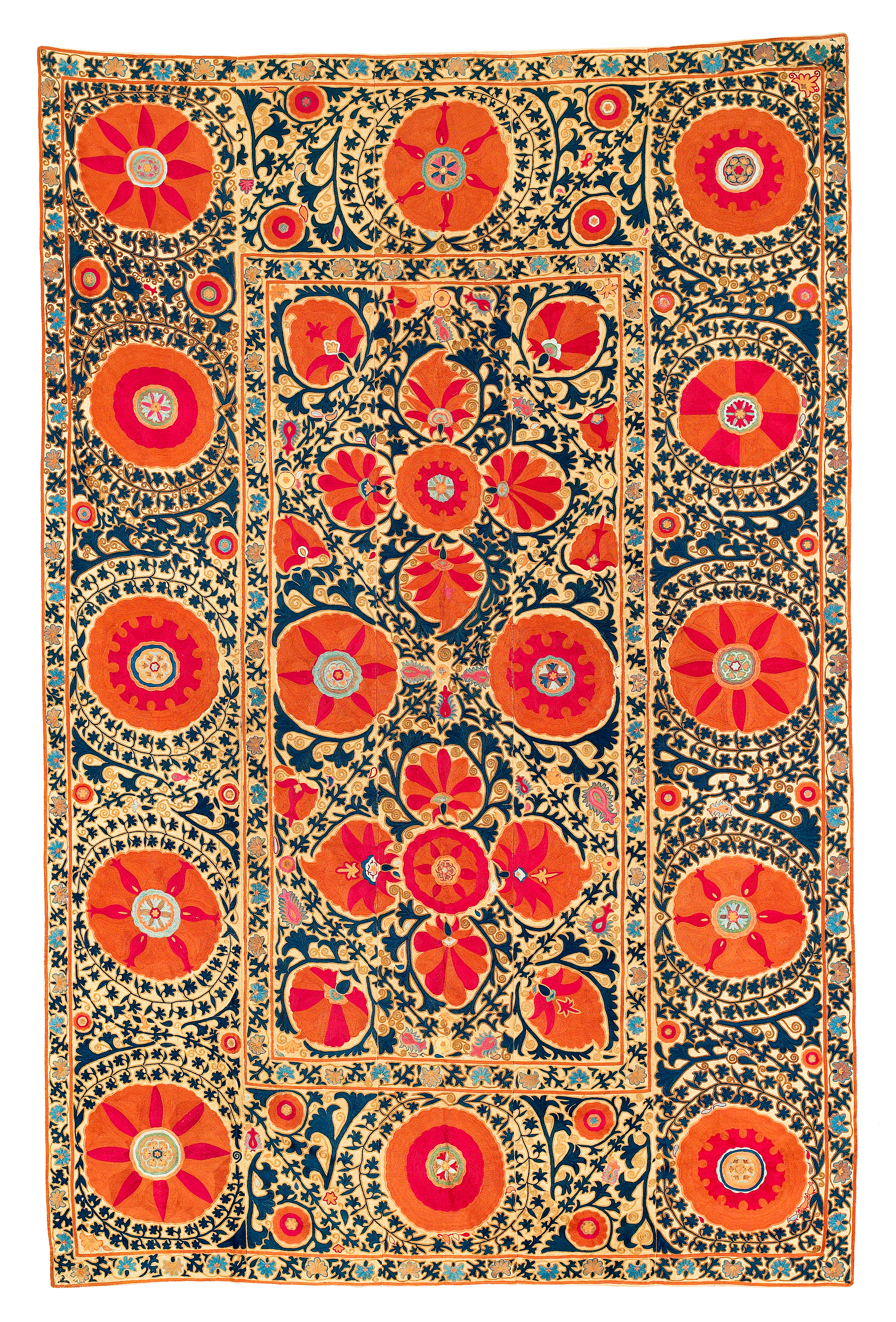
Kermina Suzani, first half 19th century, Uzbekistan. The large blossoms in red, orange, salmon, a pale aubergine and light blue show the characteristic metallic sheen of Kermina embroideries.

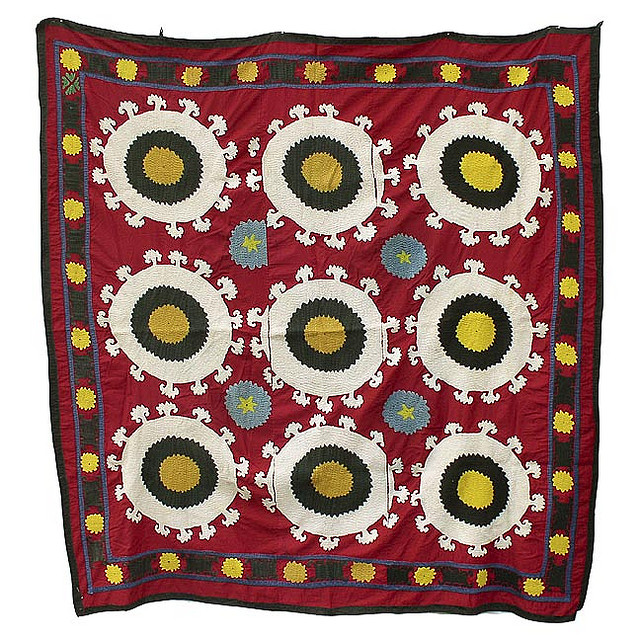
Uzbek Suzani wedding cloth

Suzani is a type of embroidered and decorative tribal textile made in Tajikistan, Uzbekistan, Afghanistan and other Central Asian countries. Suzani is from Persian: سوزن, romanized: Suzan, lit. 'needle' (Tajik: сӯзан Tajik pronunciation: [sɵ.zän]). The art of making such textiles in Iran is called سوزن‌دوزی suzandozi "needlework".

Suzanis are delicate; extremely few examples survive before the late 18th and early 19th centuries. However, they belong to a very ancient tradition. In the early 15th century, Ruy González de Clavijo, the Castilian ambassador to the court of Timur, left detailed descriptions of embroideries that were probably forerunners of the suzani.

Suzanis were traditionally made by Central Asian brides as part of their dowry, and were presented to the groom on the wedding day.

== Types ==
- Bukhara Suzani
- Khujand Suzani (Khujand, Tajikistan)
- Lakai Suzani
- Nurata Suzani, made in the town of Nurata in Uzbekistan
- Piskent Suzani
- Samarkand Suzani
- Shakhrisabz Suzani
- Tashkent Suzani
- Ura Tube Suzani (Istaravshan, Tajikistan)
- Isfara Suzani (Isfara, Tajikistan)
- Kulob Suzani (Kulob, Tajikistan)
- Darvoz Suzani (Darvaz, Tajikistan)
Stamps featuring suzanis

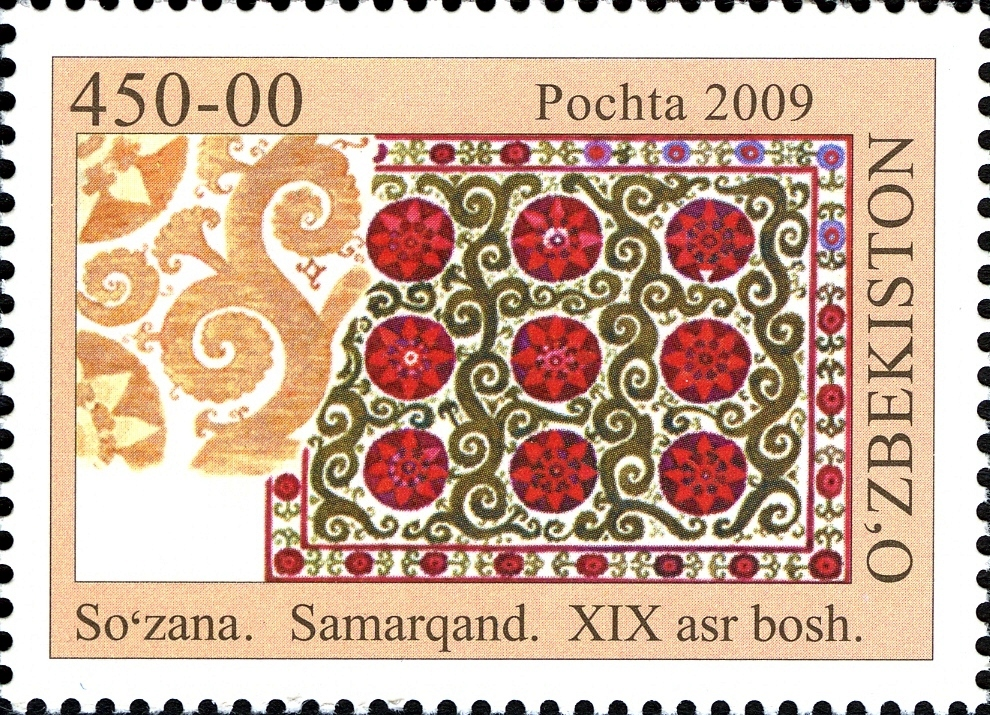
Samarkand Suzani

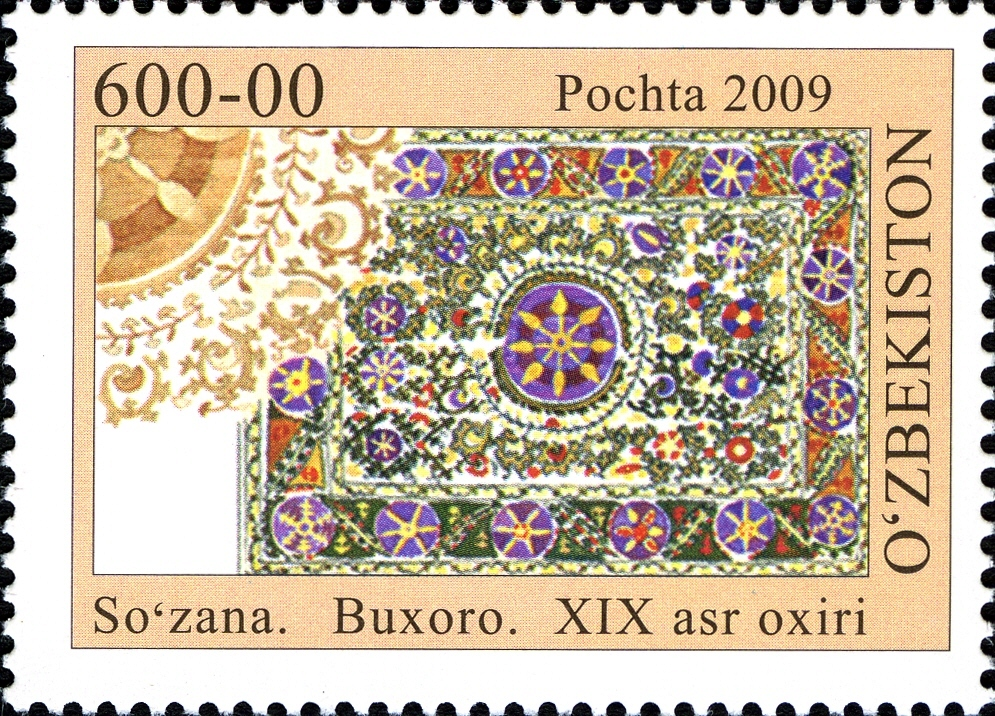
Bukhara Suzani

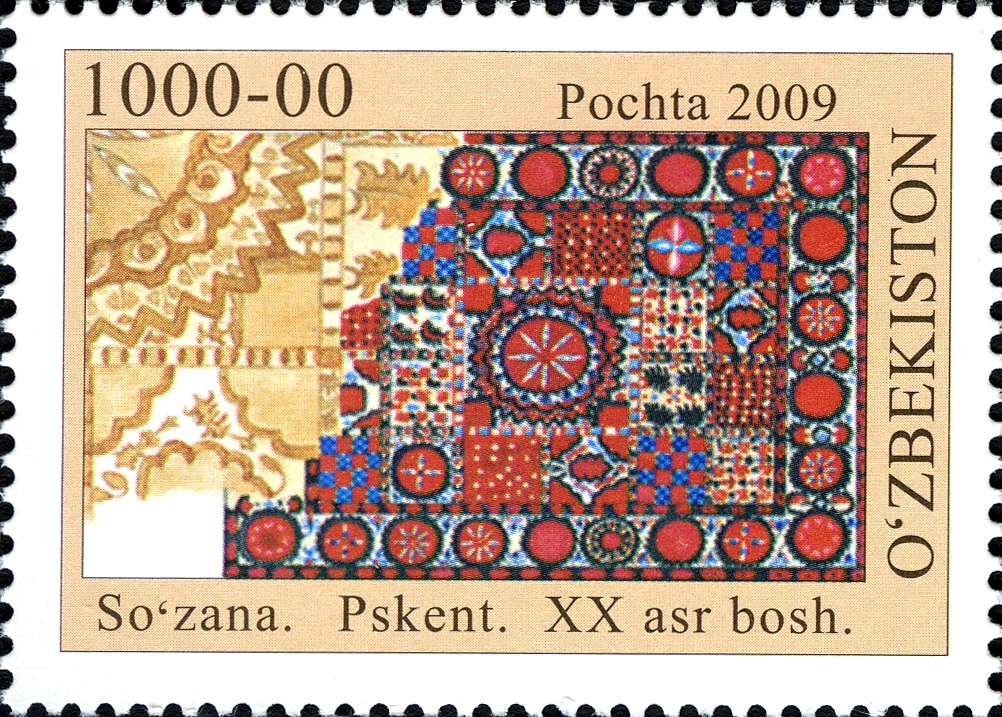
Piskent Suzani

== See also ==
- Kaitag textiles, embroidery style from Dagestan
- Tush kyiz
- Pateh, embroidered wool textile from Kerman province in Iran

== Sources and external links ==
- Guide to Suzani by Barry O'Connell. Photographs of all types of suzanis.
- Article on suzanis
- Contemporary Uzbek suzanis by Marla Mallett. Includes details of embroidery techniques.
- "Splendid Suzanis, 2003, Saudi Aramco World
- All about suzani from Central Asia
- TRC Needles entry on suzanis.
