= Primary marksmanship instructor =

US military shooting practice teacher

A primary marksmanship instructor is a United States Marine Corps specialty (MOS 0931) and acts as an instructor to other marines on how to precisely fire the M16 rifle used as the standard weapon in the Marine Corps. Instructors also train marines in use of the M9 pistol. Marksmanship instructors instruct in all phases of the Marine Corps Marksmanship Program on the qualification and requalification on small arms ranges. Additionally, they assist in the operation of firing ranges.

== See also ==
- List of weapons of the United States Marine Corps

“Identifying the Method for Effective Combat Marksmanship Training Using Site Optics and Packaged Sensor Feedback.” Accessed April 23, 2024. https://apps.dtic.mil/sti/citations/ADA552173.

“Learn About Being a Marine Corps Combat Marksmanship Coach – MOS 0933.” Accessed April 23, 2024. https://www.liveabout.com/marine-corps-enlisted-job-descriptions-3345373.
