= Hat cord =

Circular cord around a hat

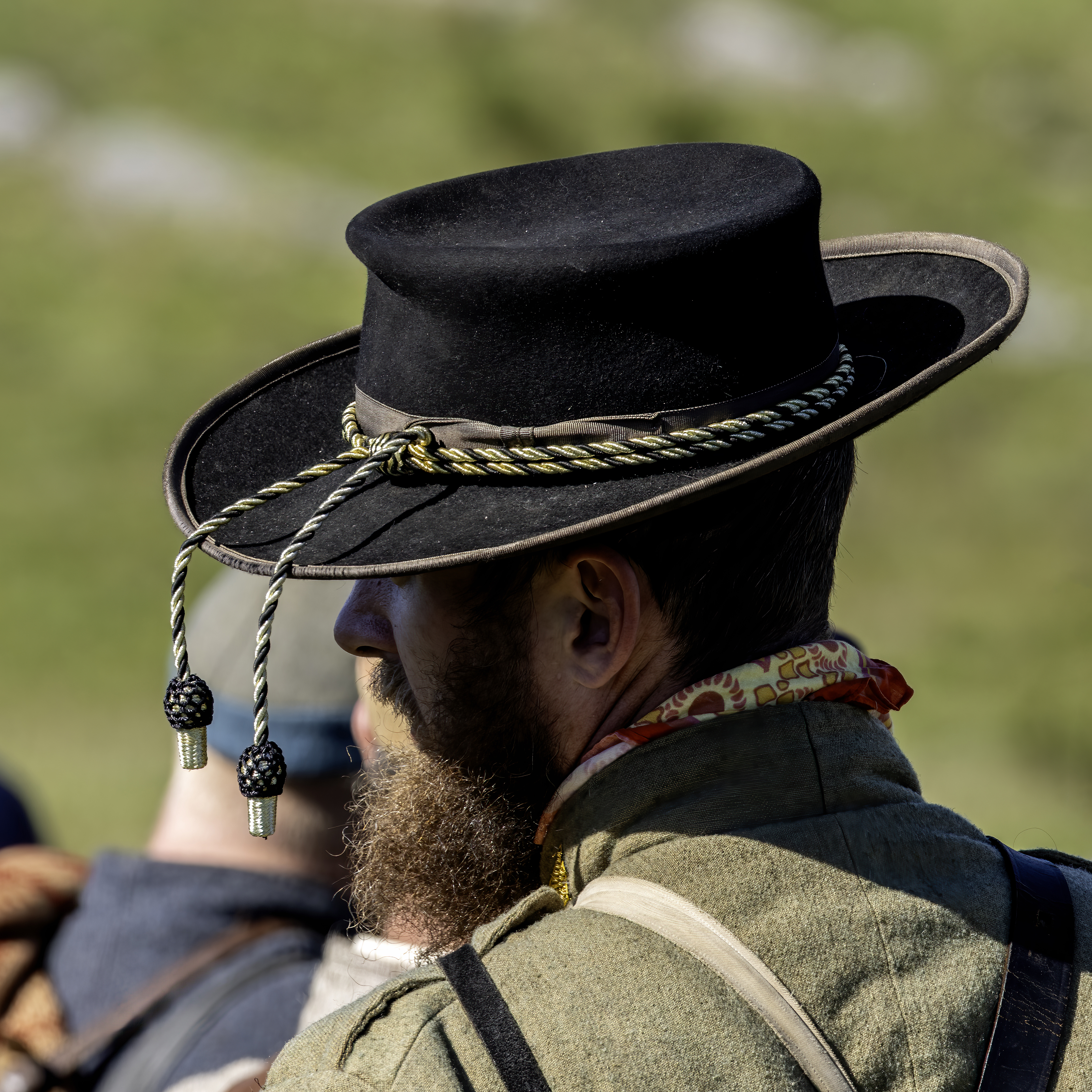
Confederate reenactor wearing a black felt hat with acorn multi-colored hat cord

A hatcord or hat cord is a circular cord around a hat at the junction of the crown and the brim. It originally served to stabilize and hold the hat on the head and to prevent the hat material separating. A hat band fulfils a similar function. Hatcords sometimes come in imaginative fashion-oriented designs.

In the Middle Ages, the hat cord was also used as a unit of measurement to control the thickness of water pipes. In order to save water, the water pipe was not allowed to be thicker than a hatcord. According to Duden, it is questionable that the German saying: Das geht (mir) über die Hutschnur ("That exceeds the hatcord [as far as I'm concerned]") meant das übersteigt das Maß des Erlaubten ("that exceed the permitted amount").

== Literature ==
- Lutz Röhrich: Lexikon der sprichwörtlichen Redensarten. Directmedia Publ., Berlin 2004, ISBN 3-89853-442-1, CD-ROM

== See also ==
- Campaign cord
