= Searchmont =

Searchmont may refer to:

- Searchmont Motor Company, a defunct automobile manufacturing company
- Searchmont, Ontario, a community in the Canadian province of Ontario
- Searchmont Resort, a ski resort in Searchmont, Ontario
