= Keystone Motor Company of Philadelphia =

Defunct American motor vehicle manufacturer

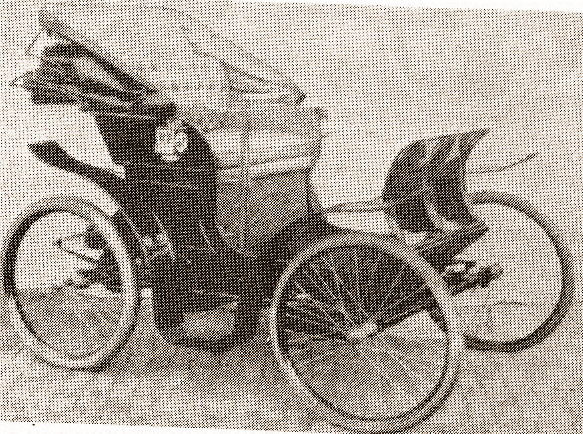
This Searchmont Wagonette (1901) is very similar to the Keystone Wagonette

The Keystone Motor Company of Philadelphia was the manufacturer of a veteran era automobile in Philadelphia, Pennsylvania in 1900.

== History ==
Keystone manufactured a water-cooled, single-cylinder engine that delivered 5 bhp (3.7 kW). This engine was made available to other manufacturers. Three models, all priced at US$750, with a wheelbase of 52 in.and tiller steering were offered.

The Autocycle was a runabout for two passengers. The engine was standing free behind the seat without protection by a hood. The vehicle had wire wheels, those in front being slightly larger.

The Wagonette was also a runabout but looked more modern and resembled the Oldsmobile Curved Dash. The front panel was curved outward and fenders with step plate were fitted. The engine was concealed in a compartment under the seat, a canopy top was an option.

A third model was the Parcel Delivery that accommodated the driver only.

In the summer of 1900, Keystone reported that 75 engines, five Autocycles and four Wagonettes were built and sold in its first month.

Philadelphia businessmen (among them Theodore C. Search, head of the Stetson Hat Company) purchased Keystone five months after the car was introduced. This became the Searchmont Motor Company . Keystone chief engineer Edward B. Gallaher became plant manager for the Searchmont.

== Sources ==
- G.N. Georgano (editor): Complete Encyclopedia of Motorcars, 1885 to the Present; Dutton Press, New York, 2. Auflage (Hardcover) 1973, ISBN 0-525-08351-0
