= Boss of the Plains =

Style of western hat

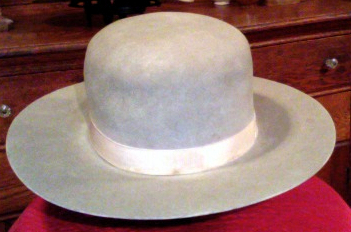
Boss of the Plains hat

The Boss of the Plains is a lightweight all-weather hat designed in 1865 by John B. Stetson for the demands of the American West. It was intended to be durable, waterproof and elegant. The term "Stetson" eventually became all-but-interchangeable with what later became known as the cowboy hat due to later style-designs based on how the rounded-crown would deform from regular use.

== Design ==
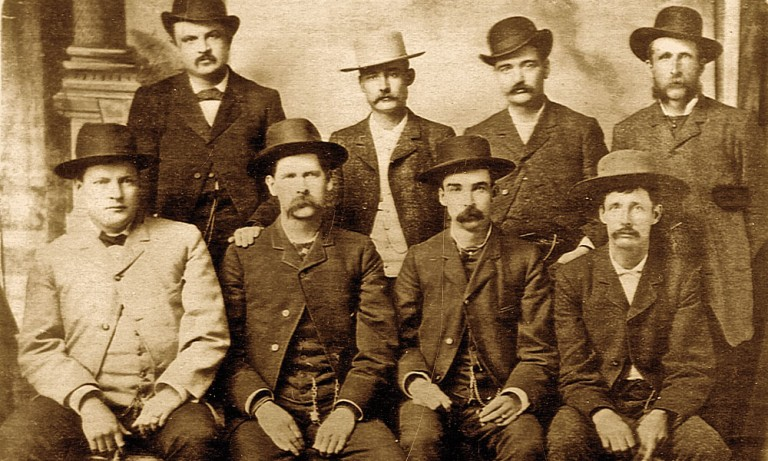
The Dodge City Peace Commission in 1883, some wearing a Boss of the Plains

The Boss was designed with a high crown to provide insulation on the top of the head, and a wide stiff brim to provide shelter from both sun and precipitation for the face, neck and shoulders. The original fur-felt hat was waterproof and shed rain. Overall, the hat was durable and lightweight. On the underside, the hat included a sweatband, a lining to protect the hat, and, as a memorial to earlier designs, a bow on its sweatband, which had the practical purpose of helping distinguish the front from the back. The original designs were natural in color with four-inch crowns and brims; a plain strap was used for the band.

For years Stetson worried about the waterproofing and finally decided to make his hat of beaver felt. It took about 42 beaver belly pelts to produce a high-quality hat. One story tells of a cowboy crossing a long dry stretch of prairie. His canteen sprang a leak. He saved the drinking water by carrying it in his Stetson. Stetson featured advertising of a cowboy watering his horse with water carried in the crown. The wearer could also use the brim to direct water to a person's mouth. A high-quality hat in good condition was also viewed in some places as a status symbol.

== Customization and change ==
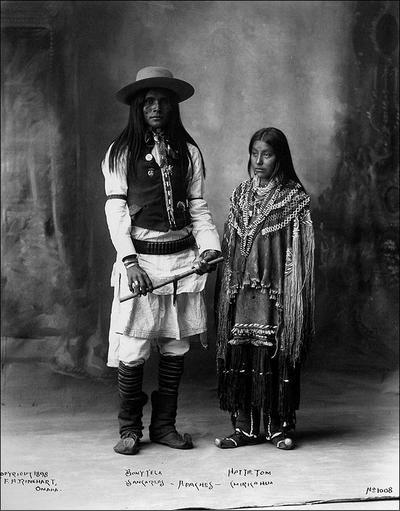
An Apache man wearing a "Boss of the Plains" Stetson

The straight-sided, round cornered, flat brimmed original Boss of the Plains design dominated for about twenty years. Most 19th-century photographs show the hat without an intentional crease, and most hats were kept open crown. However, through use, abuse, and customization by individual wearers, hats were modified from their original appearance. In particular, the crown would become dented, at first inadvertently, then by deliberate choice of individual owners. The brim was often rolled or curved and ornamentation was sometimes added. Often, these creases and brim shapes began to reflect where a particular hat owner lived or worked, and in some cases, even cowboys on individual ranches could be identified by the crease in their hat.

Thus, the manufactured styles also began to change. The first popular modification was a long crease sloping from the high back down towards the front, called the "Carlsbad crease" after a style used by wearers in Carlsbad, New Mexico. Another design, derived from the pointed top of the Mexican sombrero, worked its way north and became known as the "Montana peak", which had four dents, originally derived from being handled on top with four fingers.

== Popularization ==
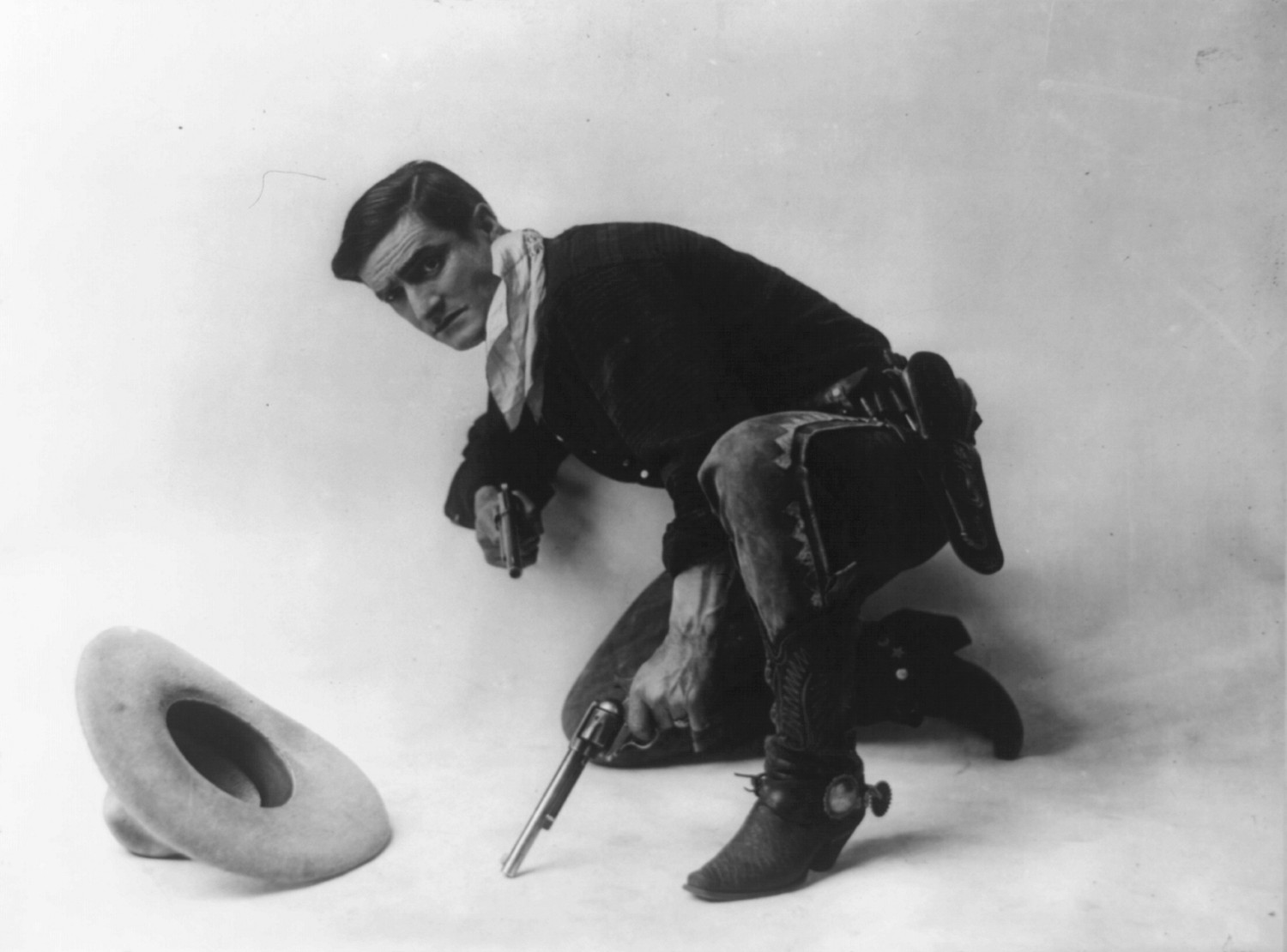
Movie star Tom Mix with a Stetson

Entertainers who promoted cowboy and western culture in the late 19th and early 20th centuries popularized Stetson designs. Buffalo Bill had custom hats with very wide brims made for his Wild West shows, with later designs created for Hollywood including the Tom Mix style "ten-gallon" hats used in Western films.

Over time, the working cowboy hat of the ranch cowboy, as modified by popular entertainers and rodeo competitors, became an essential part of the cowboy image. At times, various politicians, celebrities and law enforcement units adopted descendants of the Boss of the Plains hat to strengthen their association with the culture and values of the Old West. The Boss of the Plains-inspired design that became the modern cowboy hat has retained its basic features in construction and design since the first one in 1865, demonstrating the degree to which form succeeded in following function.

Robert Baden-Powell learned of the practicality of the Boss of the Plains hat through his association with Frederick Russell Burnham during the Second Matabele War of 1896–97, and he popularized the campaign hat or "lemon squeezer" style (i.e. flat brim with four dents at 12, 3, 6 and 9 o'clock) during the Siege of Mafeking in the Second Anglo-Boer War. When Baden-Powell established the South African Constabulary in 1900, he chose the Boss of the Plains as their uniform headgear. Popular culture has it that, on receiving the first shipment of hats from the Stetson company, the handbill identified them as 'hats, B-P style', which was misconstrued as an allusion to Baden-Powell's initials. Baden-Powell later adopted the campaign hat for use by the Boy Scouts.

== In popular culture ==
American author Laurie Winn Carlson wrote Boss of the Plains: The Hat That Won the West, which tells the history behind this hat.

== See also ==
- List of hat styles
- Campaign hat
- Charro
- Chupalla
- Cowboy hat
- Slouch hat
- Equestrian helmet
- List of headgear
- Western wear
- Cap
