= David Spearing =

Wimbledon Championships steward

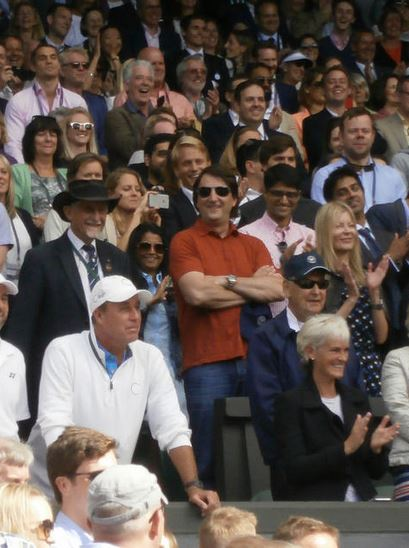
Wimbledon steward David Spearing (wearing a black hat) at Wimbledon 2016

David Spearing is the longest serving steward at the Wimbledon Championships. Spearing can be found in the player's box during the Wimbledon Championships wearing a trademark black Stetson hat. Spearing has attended Wimbledon for over 45 years. He lives in Abu Dhabi where he runs a structural engineering company.
