= Laurie Carlson =

Laurie Carlson may refer to:

- Laurie Winn Carlson (born 1952), American children's storybook author
- Laurie E. Carlson (1908–1999), member of the Wisconsin State Assembly
