= John B. Stetson House =

Historic house in Florida, United States

- U.S. National Register of Historic Places
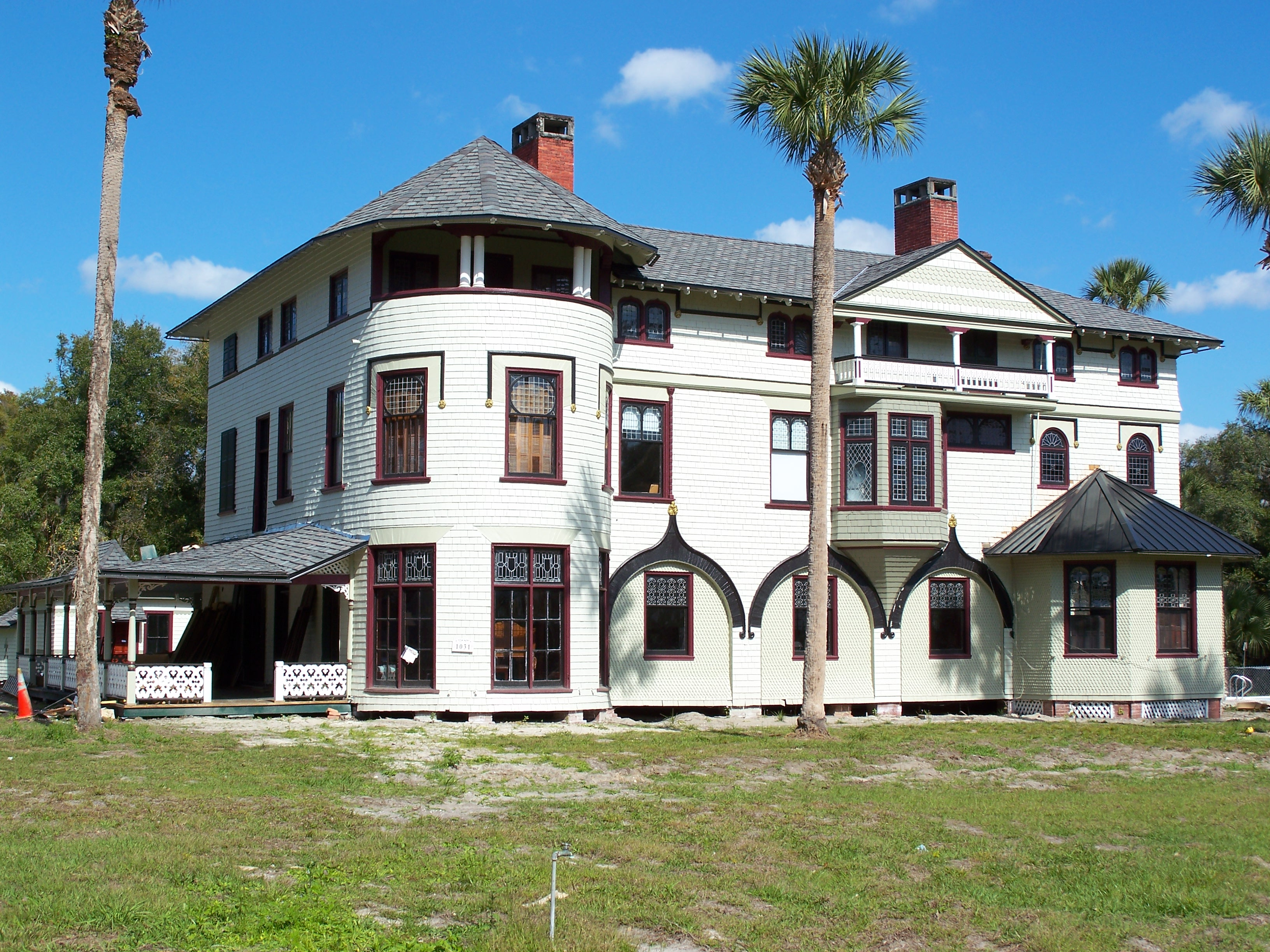
- The mansion in January 2007

- Location within Volusia County
- Location: DeLand, Florida, United States
- Coordinates: 29°01′23.7″N 81°19′23.2″W
- Built: 1886
- Architect: George T. Pearson
- Architectural style: Frame Vernacular
- NRHP reference No.: 78000957
- Added to NRHP: November 21, 1978

The John B. Stetson House (known locally as the Stetson Mansion), built for hat manufacturer (and inventor of the cowboy hat) John B. Stetson, is a historic home in DeLand, Florida, United States. It is located at 1031 Camphor Lane. The house was designed by popular Philadelphia architect George T. Pearson in 1886. Pearson also designed several buildings for Mr. Stetson on the Stetson University campus, as well as the Stetson factory buildings in North Philadelphia.

On November 21, 1978, it was added to the U.S. National Register of Historic Places.

The house was extensively renovated in 2008 and, although a private residence, is open for scheduled tours.
