= Searchmont Motor Company =

Defunct American motor vehicle manufacturer

Searchmont Motor Company Fournier-Searchmont Motor Company Searchmont Automobile Company
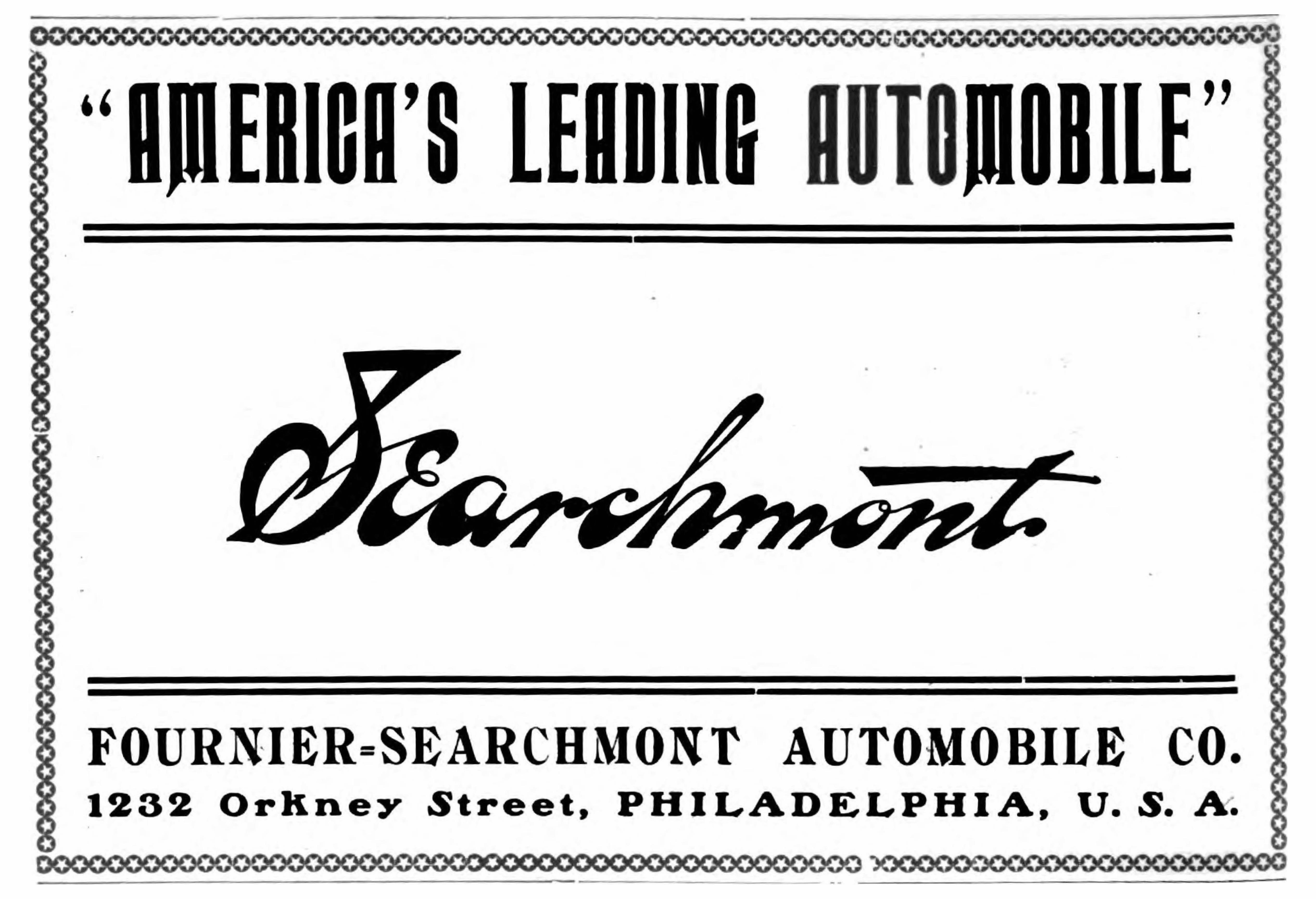
- America's Leading Automobile

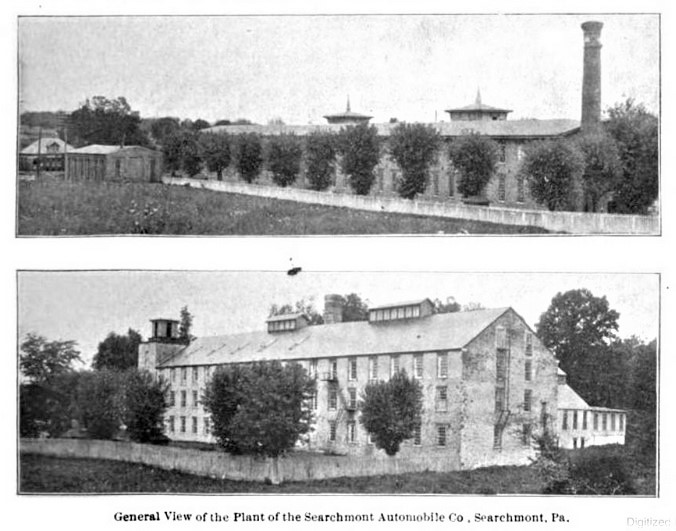
- Searchmont Factory near Chester, Pennsylvania
- Predecessor: Keystone Motor Company
- Founded: 1900; 126 years ago
- Founder: Theodore C. Search, Spenser Trask
- Defunct: 1903; 123 years ago
- Fate: Bankruptcy
- Successor: Fairmount Engineering Works
- Headquarters: Philadelphia, Pennsylvania, United States
- Key people: Theodore C. Search, Spenser Trask, Edward B. Gallaher, Lee S. Chadwick
- Products: Automobiles
- Production output: unknown (1900-1903)

The Searchmont Motor Company was a Veteran Era American luxury automobile manufacturer in Philadelphia, Pennsylvania from 1900 to 1903.

== History ==
=== Searchmont Motor Company ===
Searchmont evolved in 1900 from the Keystone Motor Company (1899–1900) when this company had been bought out by Theodore C. Search (head of the Stetson Hat Company), Spencer Trask and other local businessmen. Keystone managing director and engineer Edward B. Gallaher accepted a position as the factory and later general manager with the new company.

The Keystone Wagonette, a runabout for two passengers with a water-cooled single-cylinder engine located under the seat and with chain drive, stayed in production as the Searchmont Wagonette until 1902. In November, 1901, the car became available with a new 10 bhp (7.5 kW) twin engine. This engine was derived from the single cylinder engine, which was still offered, using many of the same parts. Initially, a Searchmont Wagonette cost $750, equivalent to $29,025 in 2025.

Involved in the development of the Searchmont automobile was a young engineer named Lee Sherman Chadwick who was factory superintendent for Searchmont from 1901. In 1902, Spenser Trask interested the well-known French Race car driver Henri Fournier, in the Searchmont company. Fournier was the winner of the 1901 Paris–Bordeaux and Paris–Berlin races for Mors, and getting him involved with Searchmont would be great for advertising and branding.

=== Fournier-Searchmont Automobile Company ===
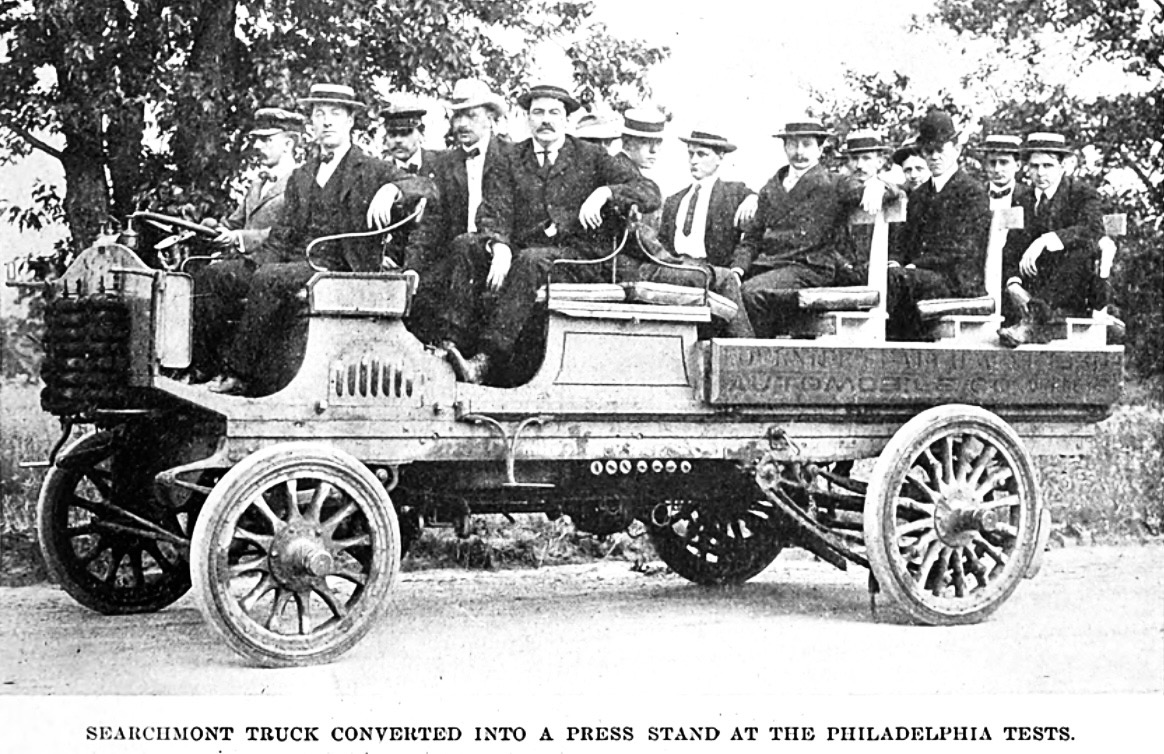
Fournier-Searchmont truck (1902)

On December 16, 1901, the Fournier-Searchmont Automobile Company was incorporated in a new reorganization that would double the investment capital. Fournier-Searchmonts and Fournier's Mors race car were shown at the March 1902 Chicago Auto Show where Henri Fournier was headlined. In May 1902 Fournier took on a large garage in Paris France and said he would spend only one month a year in the United States on Fournier-Searchmont business.

Searchmont was very active in Endurance Trials and received blue ribbons for all three entries in the New York to Buffalo Run in 1901. In the 1902 Long Island Trials, all three Searchmonts and seven other participants were controversially disqualified for exceeding 15 miles per hour.

E. B. Gallagher departed Searchmont in 1902 to become general manager of Mobile Company of America, and Lee Chadwick became the chief-engineer and superintendent of the Searchmont factory.

Two new front-engined cars were introduced for 1902 which featured many parts from the Wagonette. Both were runabouts with improved engines. The smaller and sportier Type III had a wheelbase of 66 inches (1,700 mm) and a 12 bhp (8.9 kW), two-cylinder engine. The bigger Type IV had a wheelbase of 70 inches (1,800 mm) and 6 bhp (4.5 kW) from a single cylinder engine.

A larger Twin-engine, Type V appeared in time for the Chicago Auto Show. E. B. Gallagher is credited as the designer although it was heavily advertised as a Fournier-Searchmont. It came with four-seater Tonneau coachwork, the Type III's twin engine, and had a wheelbase of 78 inches (2,000 mm). French influence is evident in the new Searchmont, shown in a certain resemblance with the contemporary Mors and the use of a pressure feed lubrication system, the first in a U. S. production car. The improved cars doubled in price over the $1,200 (equivalent to $44,654 in 2025) runabout, the Type III now priced at $2,000 and the Type V at $2,250, equivalent to $83,726 in 2025.

Searchmont refined the Type V and offered it as the Type VI with 8 bhp (6.0 kW) for 1903. A new addition was the Type VII, a very attractive four-passenger Tonneau with a 10 bhp (7.5 kW) two-cylinder engine and a wheelbase of 81 in. They cost $2,000 and $2,500, respectively.

=== Searchmont Automobile Company ===
In June 1903 the Fournier-Searchmont Automobile Company became the Searchmont Automobile Company, with some new corporate officers. Also new was a large purpose-built factory near Chester, Pennsylvania.

Lee Chadwick developed a four-cylinder engine with 32 bhp (24 kW) for a new Type VIII which was scheduled for 1904. This did not occur because, as Lee Chadwick later reminisced, in the summer of 1903 "Spencer Trask got pinched in the stock market...and the rest of the gang just quit." The company was adjudged bankrupt on December 29, 1903, and assets were liquidated the following year.

The John Wanamaker Department Stores, who were investors and held New York and Philadelphia agencies for Searchmont, bought the remaining stock of 100 two-cylinder cars for only $750 a piece, selling them easily as 1904 Searchmonts at $1,200. One of them was bought by Charles Yale Knight, who put the first of his sleeve valve engines in it.

== Advertisements ==
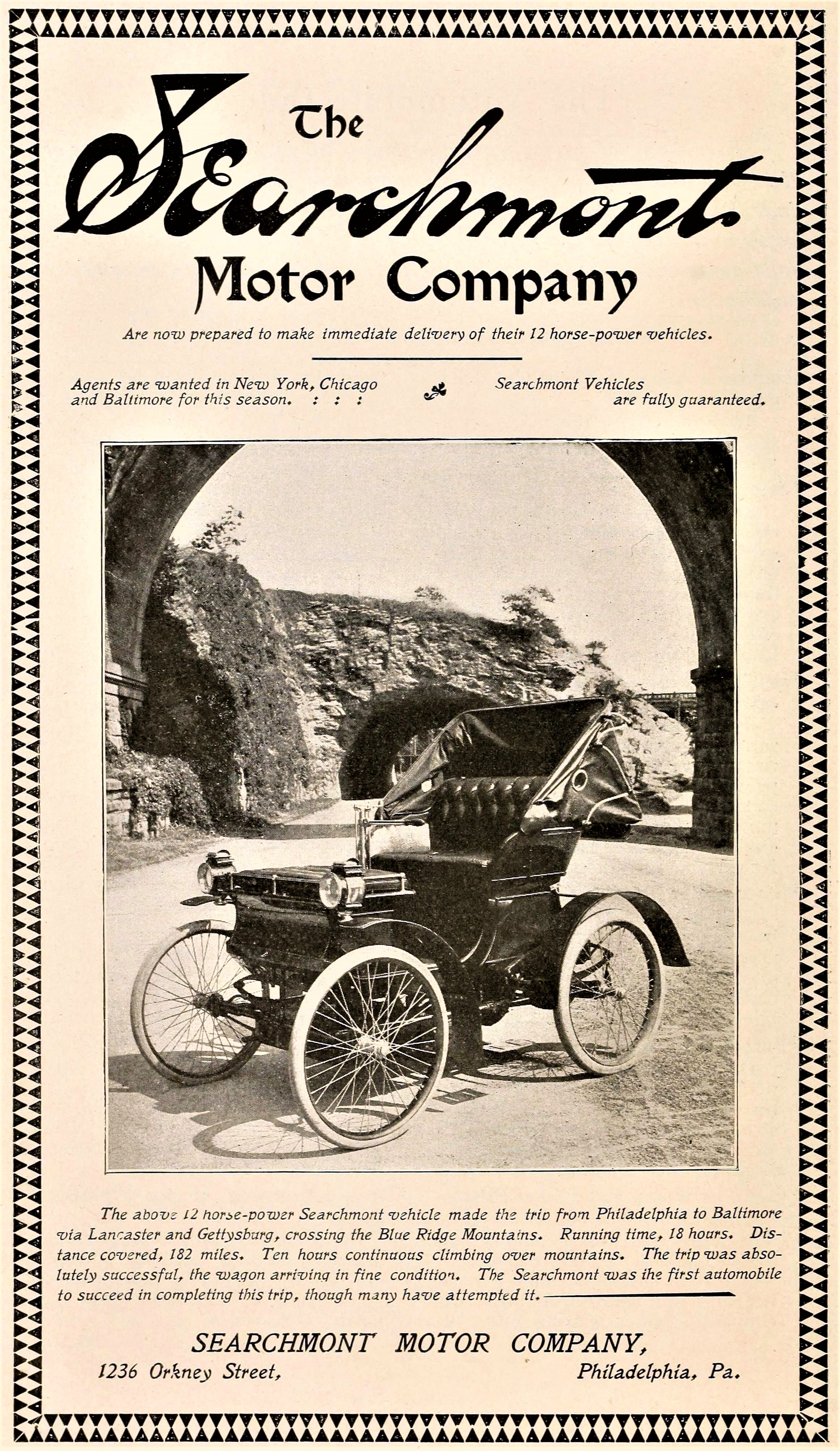
1901 Searchmont advertisement - The Horseless Age

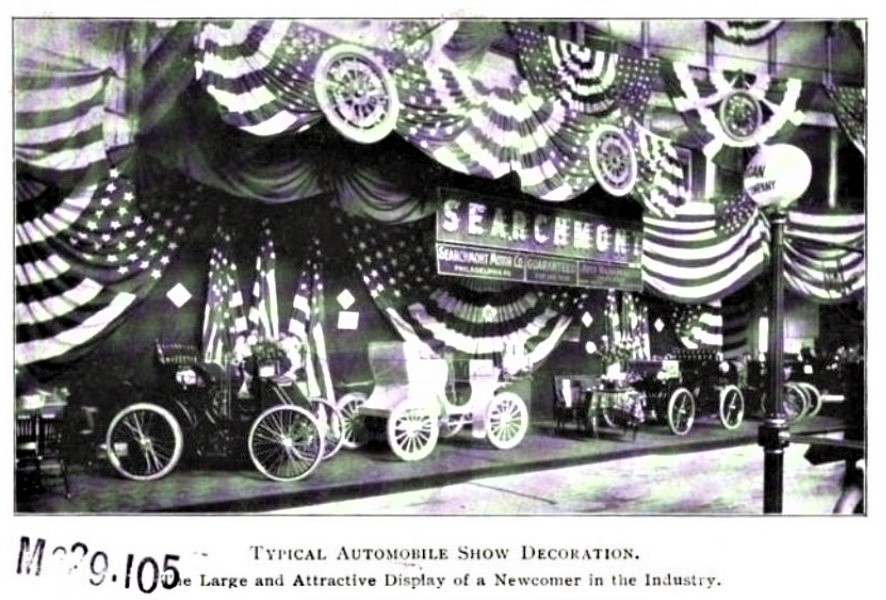
1901 Searchmont display at the Chicago Show on the cover of Automobile Topics

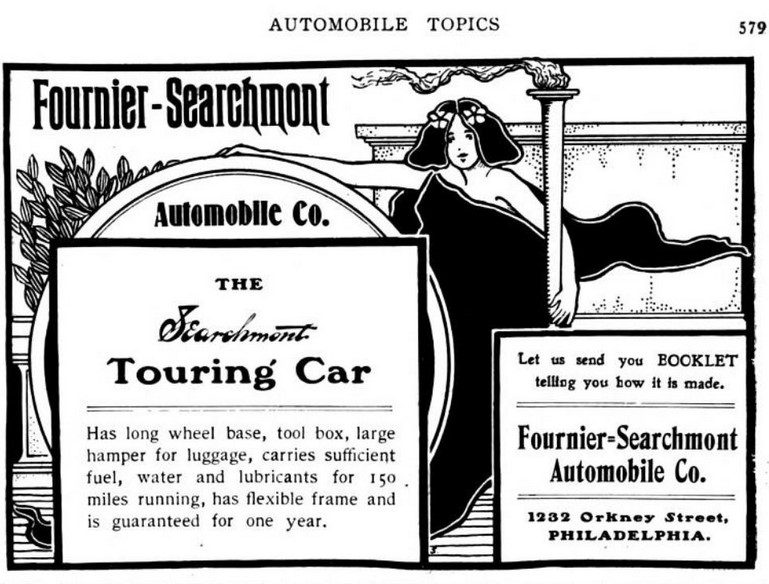
1902 Fournier-Searchmont advertisement in Automobile Topics

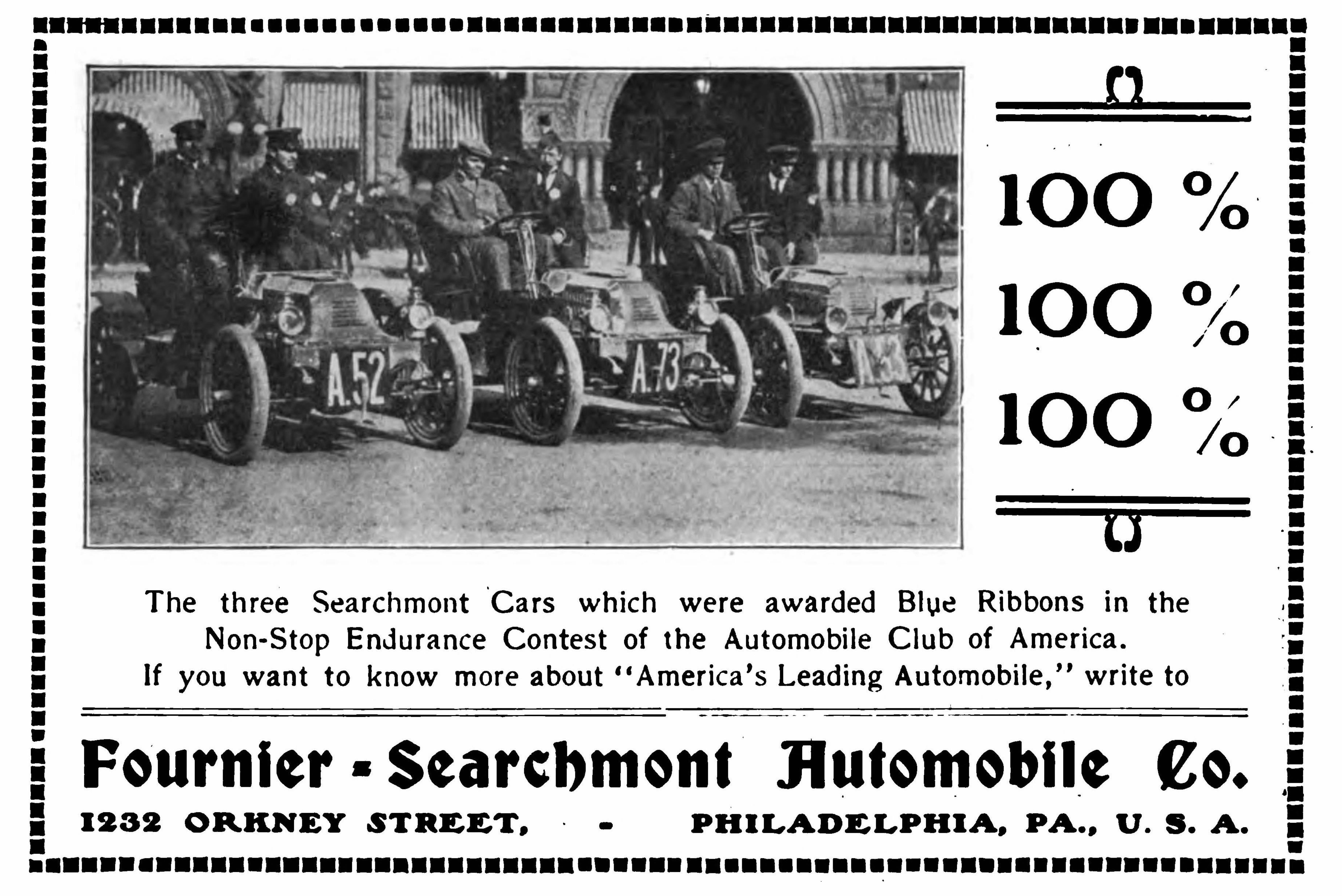
1902 Fournier-Searchmont advertisement in The Automobile Review

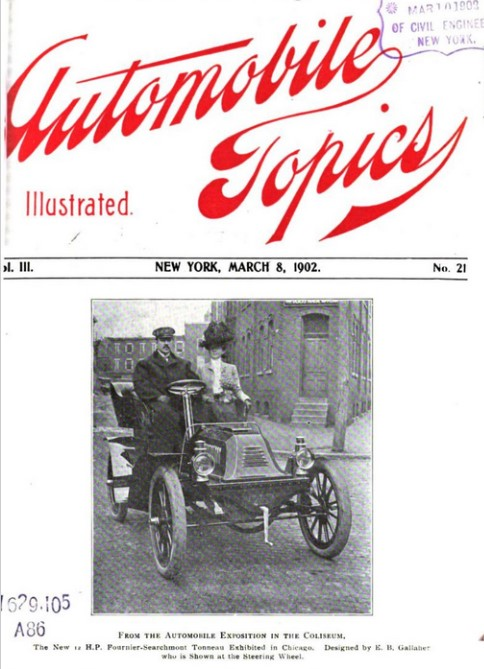
1902 Fournier-Searchmont Type V on the cover of Automobile Topics Chicago Auto Show edition

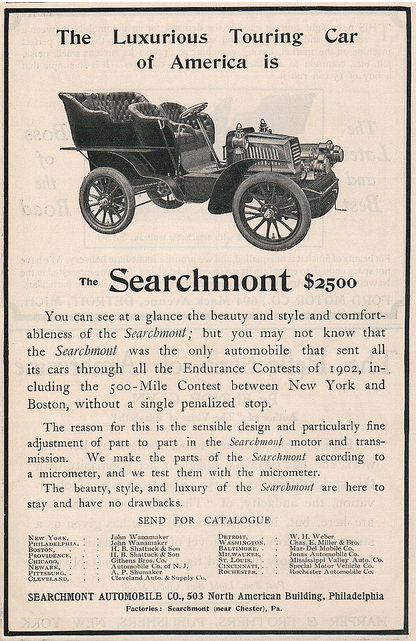
1903 Searchmont Type VI or VII advertisement in Horseless Age

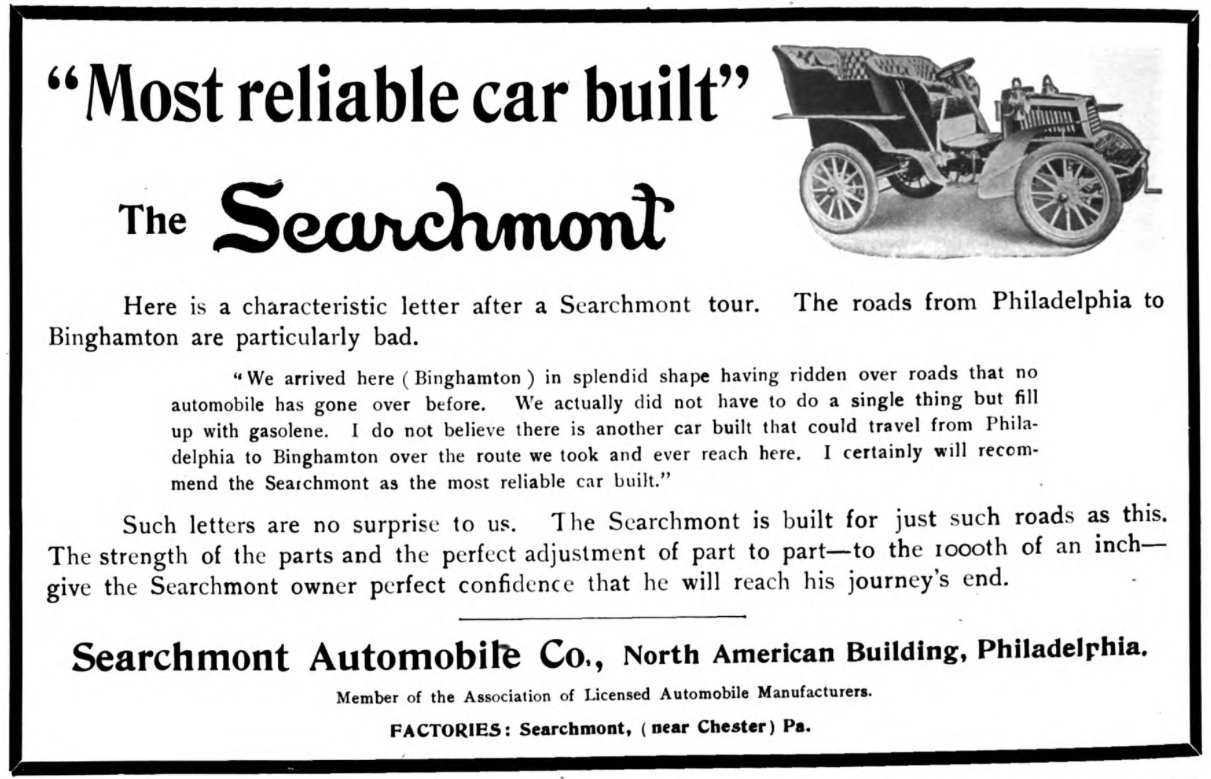
1903 Searchmont Type VI or VII advertisement

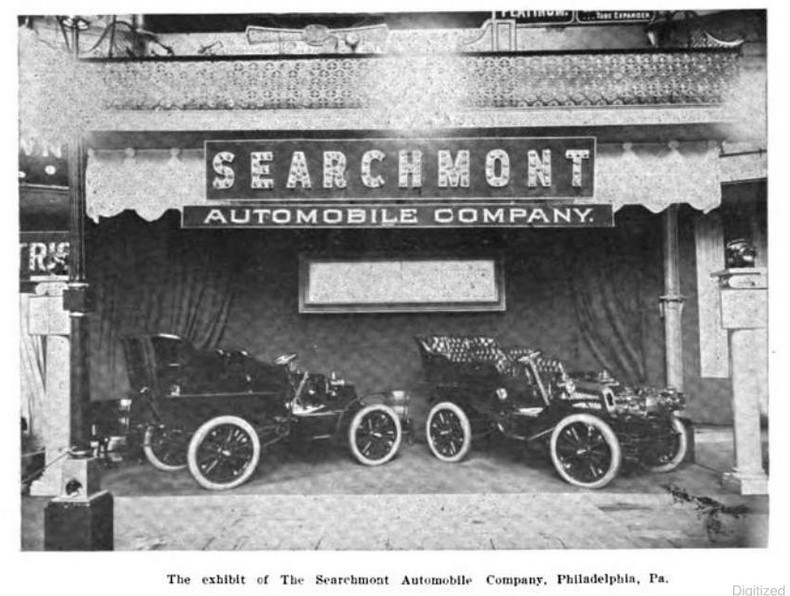
1903 Searchmont Type VI and VII, New York Auto Show display - Cycle and Automobile Trade Journal

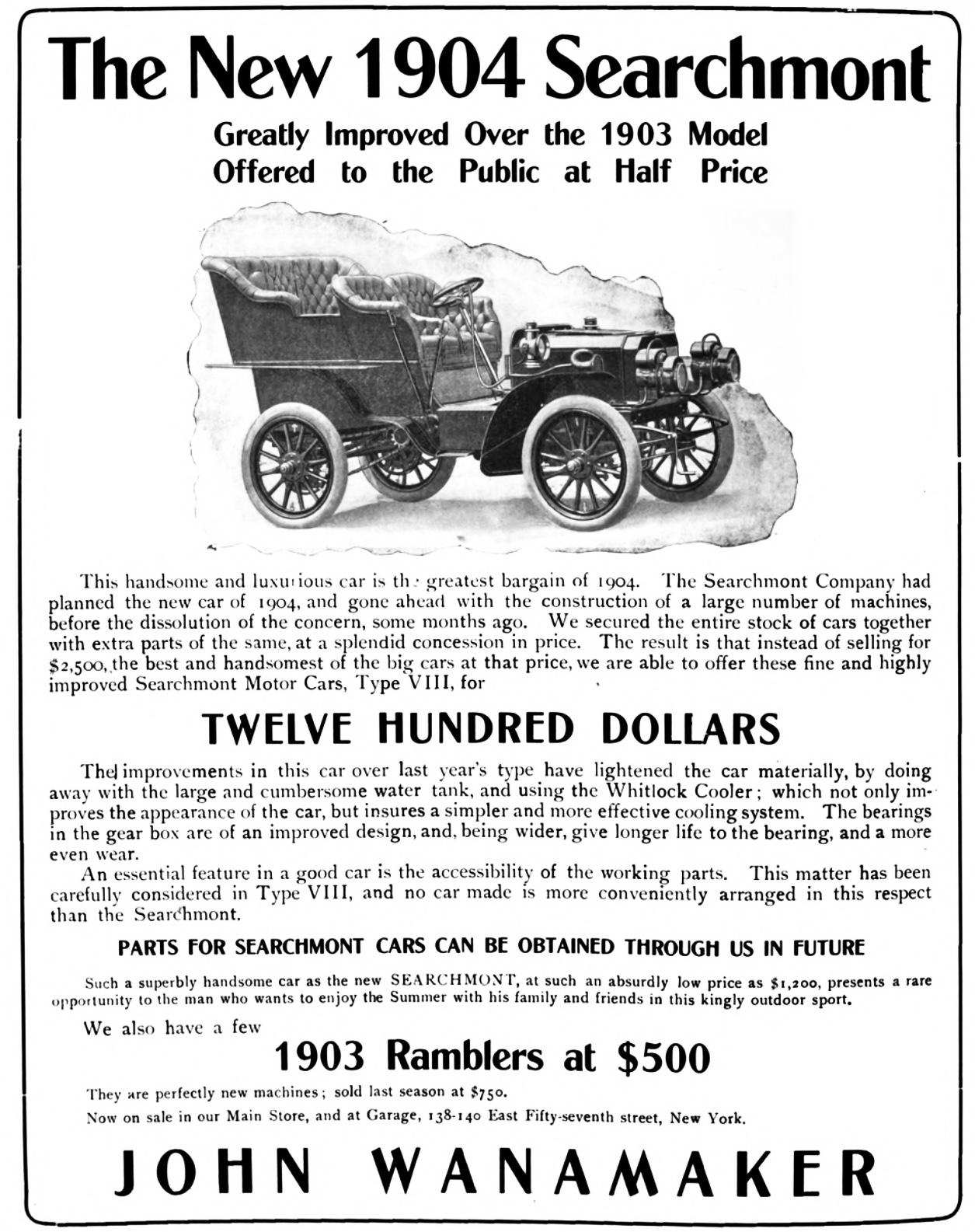
Searchmont Type VIII (John Wanamaker Department Stores Edition) 1904

== Gallery ==
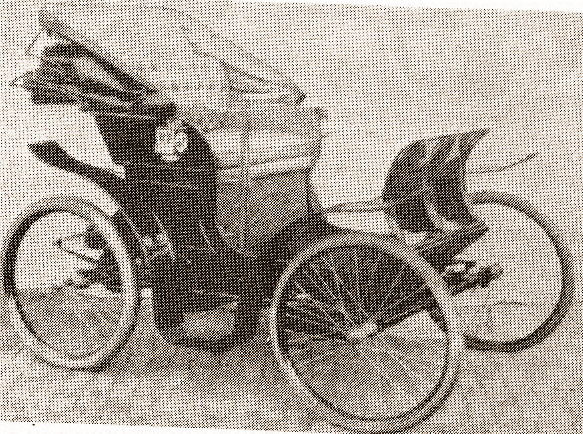
1900-1901 Searchmont Wagonette

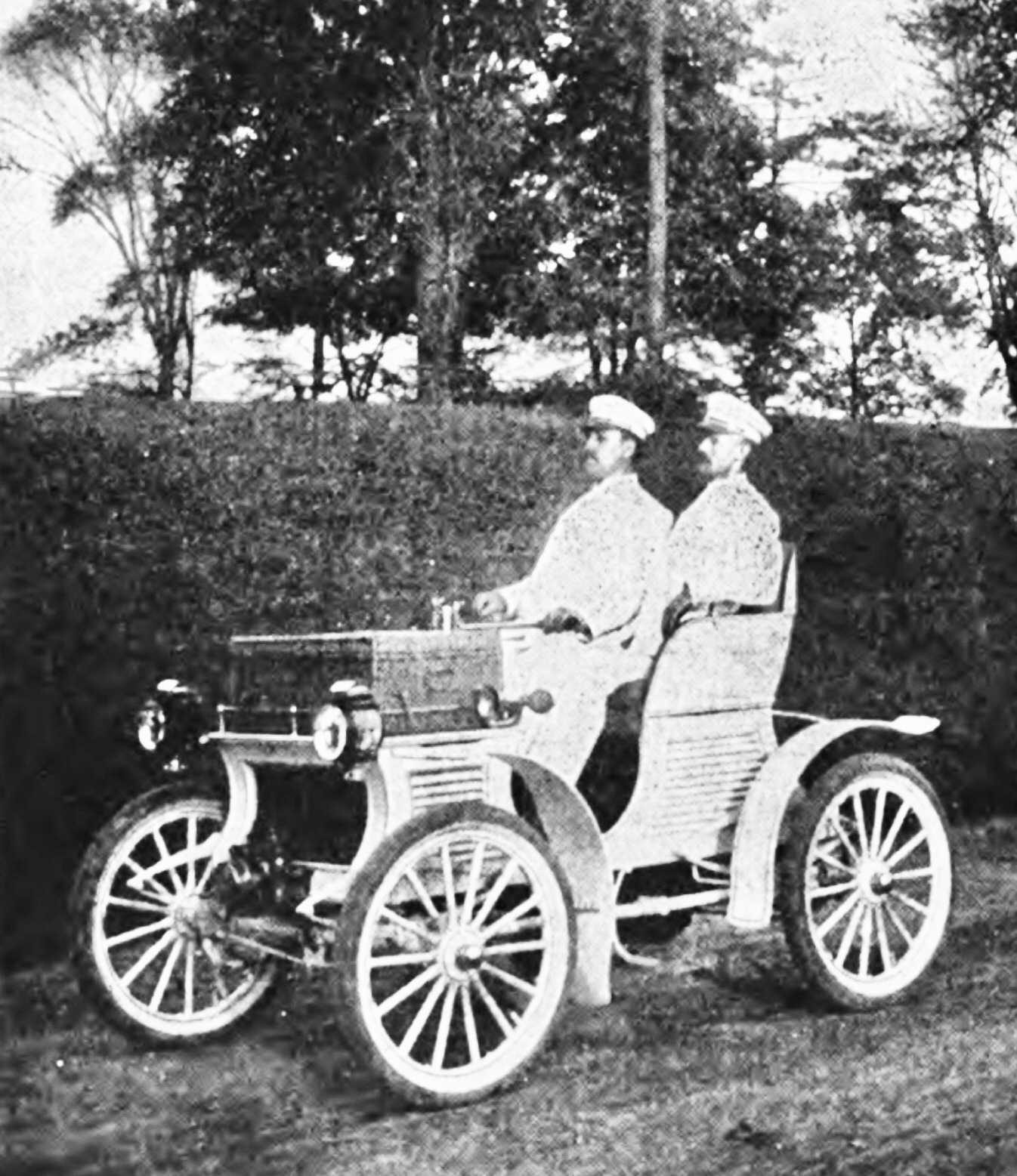
1901-1902 Searchmont Type III

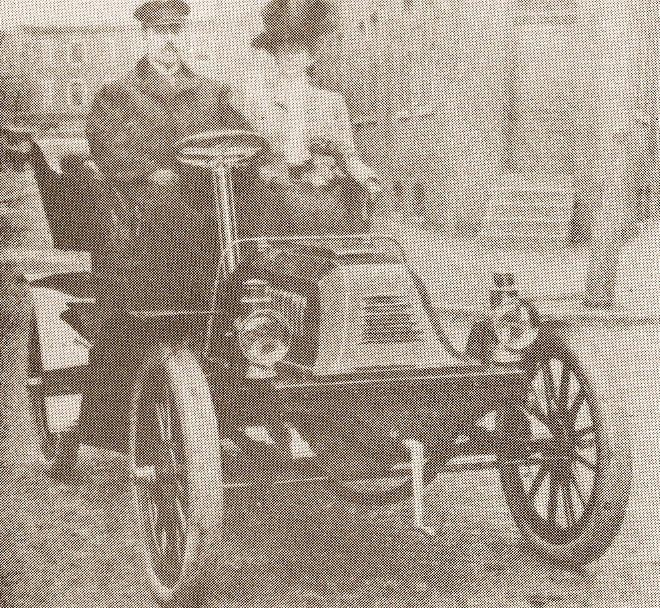
1902 Fournier-Searchmont Type V Tonneau

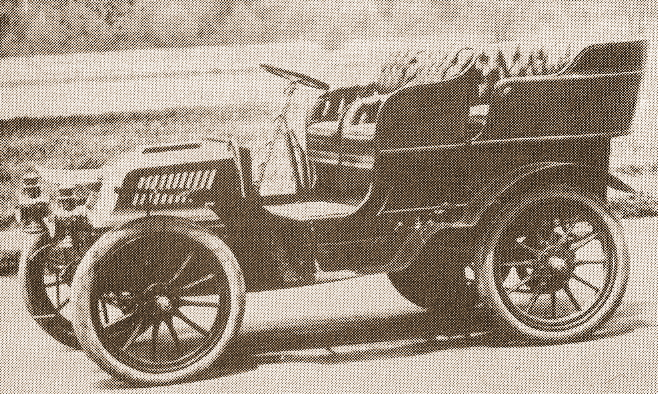
1903 Searchmont Type VII Touring

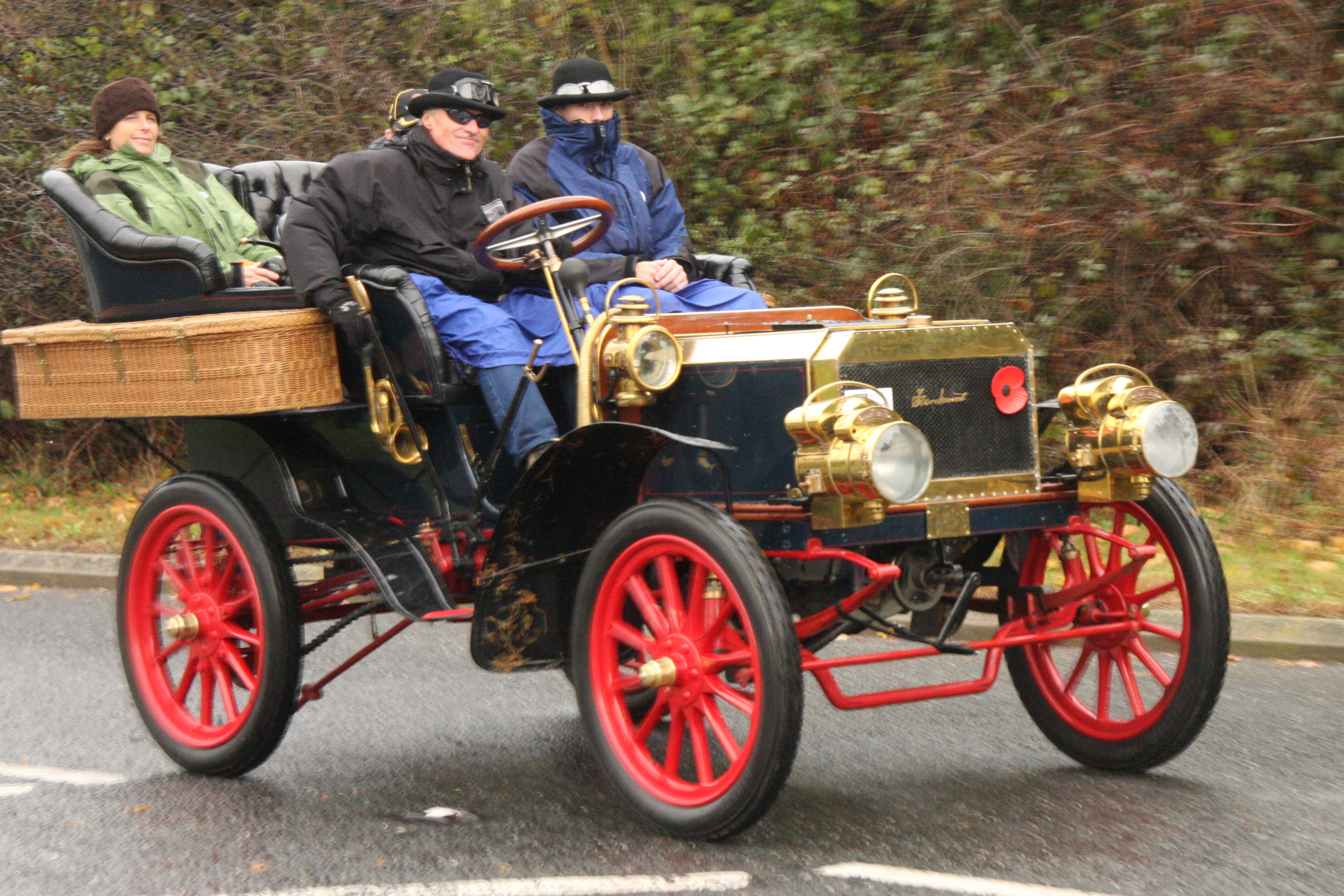
1904 Searchmont Type VI Touring shown at the 2009 London to Brighton Veteran Car Run

== Legacy ==
Lee Chadwick was disappointed that the new Searchmont four-cylinder car was abandoned. He bought all plans and the already delivered parts and founded his own company, the Fairmount Engineering Works, which soon became the Chadwick Engineering Works, and started production. He built the car as the 1904–05 Chadwick Type 9 seven-passenger touring car with a wheelbase of 107.5 inches (2,730 mm) at a price of $4,000. Its engine now delivered 32 bhp (24 kW) and the car became the ancestor of a well-respected luxury sporting motor car.

The Type VI Tonneau chassis No. 310 pictured in the London to Brighton Veteran Car Run is in the collection at the Seal Cove Auto Museum. A second Searchmont, 1903 model five-passenger Deluxe Type VII, is in the collection of the Forney Transportation Museum.
