= John B. Stetson =

American hat maker (1830–1906)

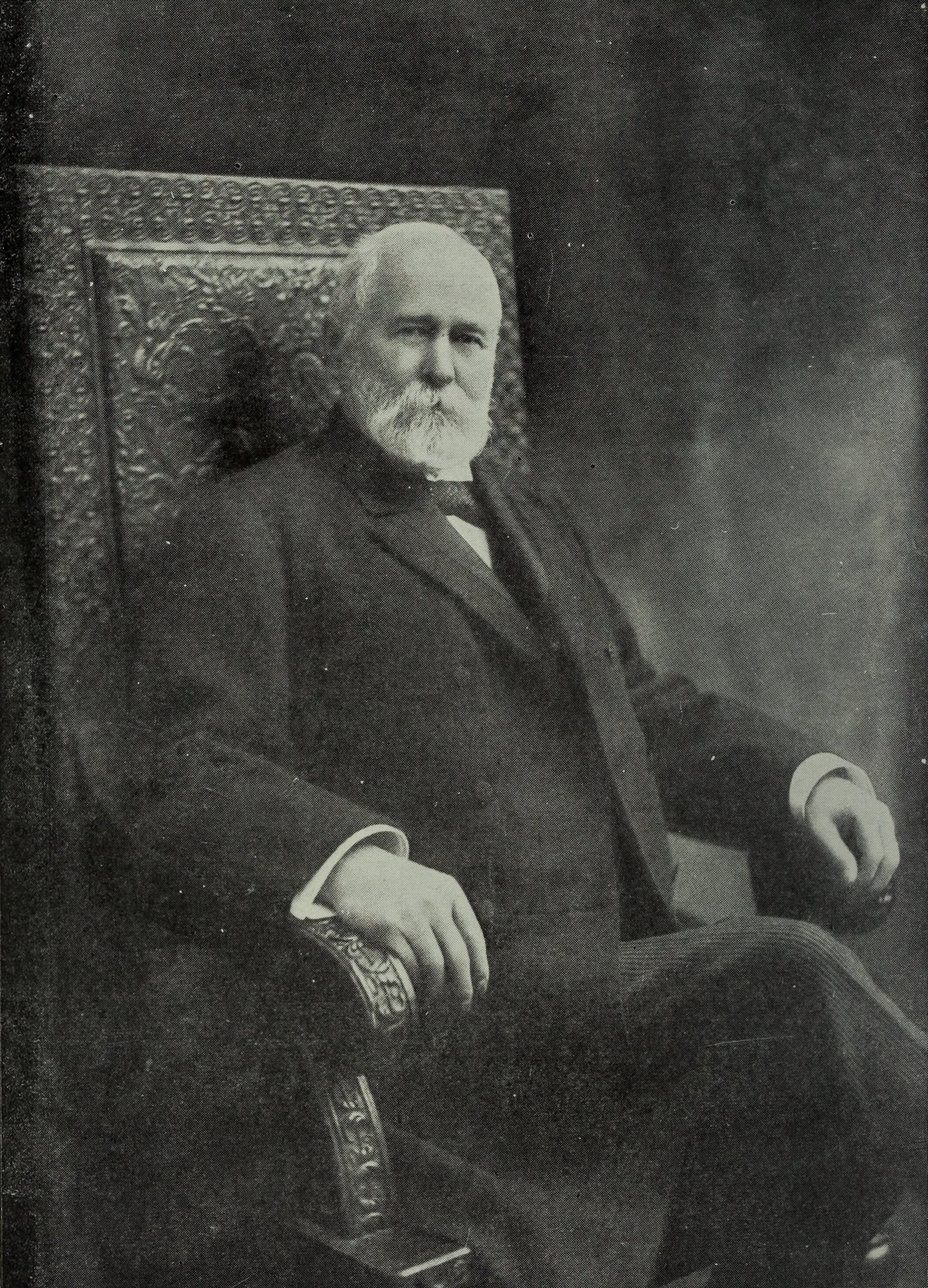
- Portrait of John B. Stetson
- Born: John Batterson Stetson; May 5, 1830; Orange, New Jersey, U.S.
- Died: February 18, 1906 (aged 75); DeLand, Florida, U.S.
- Resting place: West Laurel Hill Cemetery, Bala Cynwyd, Pennsylvania, U.S.
- Occupation: Hatter
- Known for: Invented the cowboy hat
- Spouses: Nancy Haines (m. 1850, ?) Elizabeth Shindler (m. 1884)
- Children: 3, including John Jr.

John Batterson Stetson (May 5, 1830 – February 18, 1906) was an American hat maker who invented the cowboy hat in the 1860s. He founded the John B. Stetson Company in Philadelphia, Pennsylvania, in 1865, and it became one of the largest hat manufacturers in the world. The company's hats are now commonly referred to simply as Stetsons.

His philanthropy helped fund Temple University and Stetson University, as well as a YMCA and a homeless shelter and soup kitchen in Philadelphia. His mansion, the John B. Stetson House, in DeLand, Florida, was placed on the National Register of Historic Places in 1978.

== Early life ==
Stetson was born on May 5, 1830, in Orange, New Jersey, one of 12 children. His father, Stephen Stetson, was a hatter and taught his son the trade. He never attended school but was taught to read and write at home by his mother. In the late 1850s, Stetson was diagnosed with tuberculosis and his doctor predicted he had only a short time to live. He left the hat-making business to explore the American West before he died.

He moved first to Illinois, and then to Saint Joseph, Missouri. In Saint Joseph, he worked in a brickyard and eventually became manager and part-owner; however the business was ruined in a flood. He attempted to enroll in the military during the American Civil War but was rejected due to his health condition. He accepted a position in a party travelling to Pike's Peak in Colorado. During the trip to Colorado, Stetson relied on his hat-making skills to turn animal pelts into felt for him and his travelling companions to use for water-proof tents and hats. He had the inkling of a future business when a bullwhacker bought one of his hats from him for $5. He worked as a gold miner at Pike's Peak for one year. His health improved and he returned to Philadelphia to begin a hat making business.

== Career ==
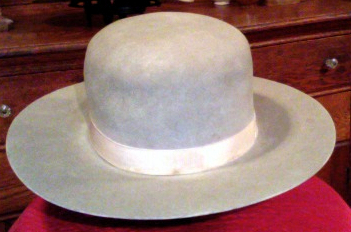
The Boss of the Plains style was one of the first cowboy hats created by Stetson

In 1865, Stetson moved to Philadelphia and founded the John B. Stetson Company to manufacture hats suited to the needs of Westerners. He created a modified sombrero and sent samples of the Boss of the Plains style he had invented to dealers in the West and was soon inundated with requests for more. These lightweight hats were natural in color with four inch crowns and brims; a plain strap was used for the band.

Due to the time he had spent with cowboys and Western settlers, Stetson knew firsthand that the headwear they wore (such as coonskin caps, sea captain hats, straw hats, wool top hats, Hardee hats, and wool derbies) were impractical. He decided to offer people a better hat. Made from waterproof felt, the new hat was durable and the wide brim protected the wearer from the sun and rain.

One observer noted, "It kept the sun out of your eyes and off your neck. It was like an umbrella. It gave you a bucket (the crown) to water your horse and a cup (the brim) to water yourself. It made a hell of a fan, which you need sometimes for a fire but more often to shunt cows this direction or that."

Stetson went on to build the Carlsbad, easily identified by its main crease down the front. His hat was called a Stetson, because he had his name John B. Stetson Company embossed in gold in every hatband. The Stetson soon became the most well known hat in the West. All the high-crowned, wide-brimmed, soft felt western hats that followed are intimately associated with the cowboy image created by Stetson.

The Stetson cowboy hat was the symbol of the highest quality. Western icons such as Buffalo Bill Cody, Calamity Jane, Will Rogers, Annie Oakley, Pawnee Bill, Tom Mix, and the Lone Ranger wore Stetsons. The company also made hats for the Texas Rangers, which became the first law enforcement agency to incorporate the cowboy hat into their uniform. Stetson's Western-style hats were worn by employees of the National Park Service, U.S. Cavalry soldiers, and U.S. presidents, including Lyndon B. Johnson, Ronald Reagan and George W. Bush. The militaries of Canada, South Africa and the United Kingdom have incorporated the Stetson into their uniforms.

=== John B. Stetson Company ===
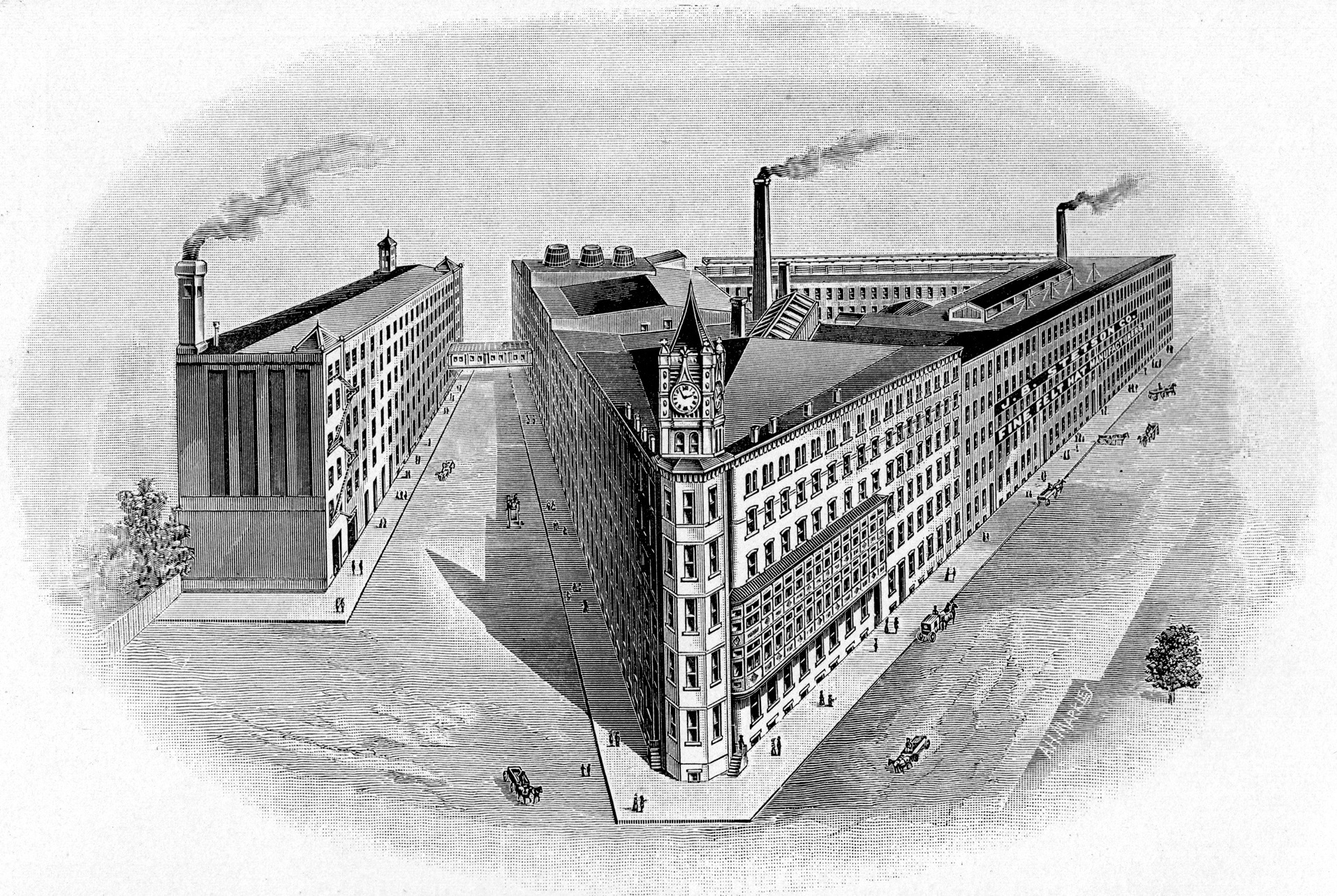
The John B. Stetson Co. Factory in Philadelphia

Under Stetson's direction, The John B. Stetson Company became one of the largest hat firms in the world. The plant in Philadelphia covered over five acres and contained over 24 acres of floor space. Stetson hats won numerous awards, but as his company grew, he "faced the challenge of developing a reliable labor force." Reportedly, "people working in the hat trade at that time tended to drift from employer to employer" and "absenteeism was rampant." Stetson, "guided by Baptist religious principles, believed that by providing for his employees he would lend stability to their lives and attract higher caliber ones." Unlike most other employers, Stetson decided to offer benefits to entice workers to stay. Stetson also made sure his employees had a clean, safe place to work, including building a hospital, a park and houses for his 5,000 employees. Stetson's unusual moves helped him build a factory in Philadelphia that grew to 25 buildings on 9 acres (36,000 m^{2}). By 1915, nine years after Stetson's death, 5,400 employees produced 3.3 million hats.

== Philanthropy and legacy ==
While Stetson profited from his business, he also wanted to give back to his community. Near the end of his life, Stetson donated almost all of his money to charitable organizations. He built grammar and high schools and helped build colleges, including Temple and Stetson Universities. He also helped establish the YMCA in Philadelphia. Stetson donated generously to the DeLand Academy in DeLand, Florida, which was renamed John B. Stetson University in 1889. In 1900, Stetson University founded the first law school in Florida: Stetson University College of Law.

In 1878, Stetson co-founded the Sunday Breakfast Rescue Mission, a homeless shelter and soup kitchen. Sunday Breakfast Rescue Mission has expanded to provide more services, changed their name to Philly House, and is still active in support of the homeless population of Philadelphia.

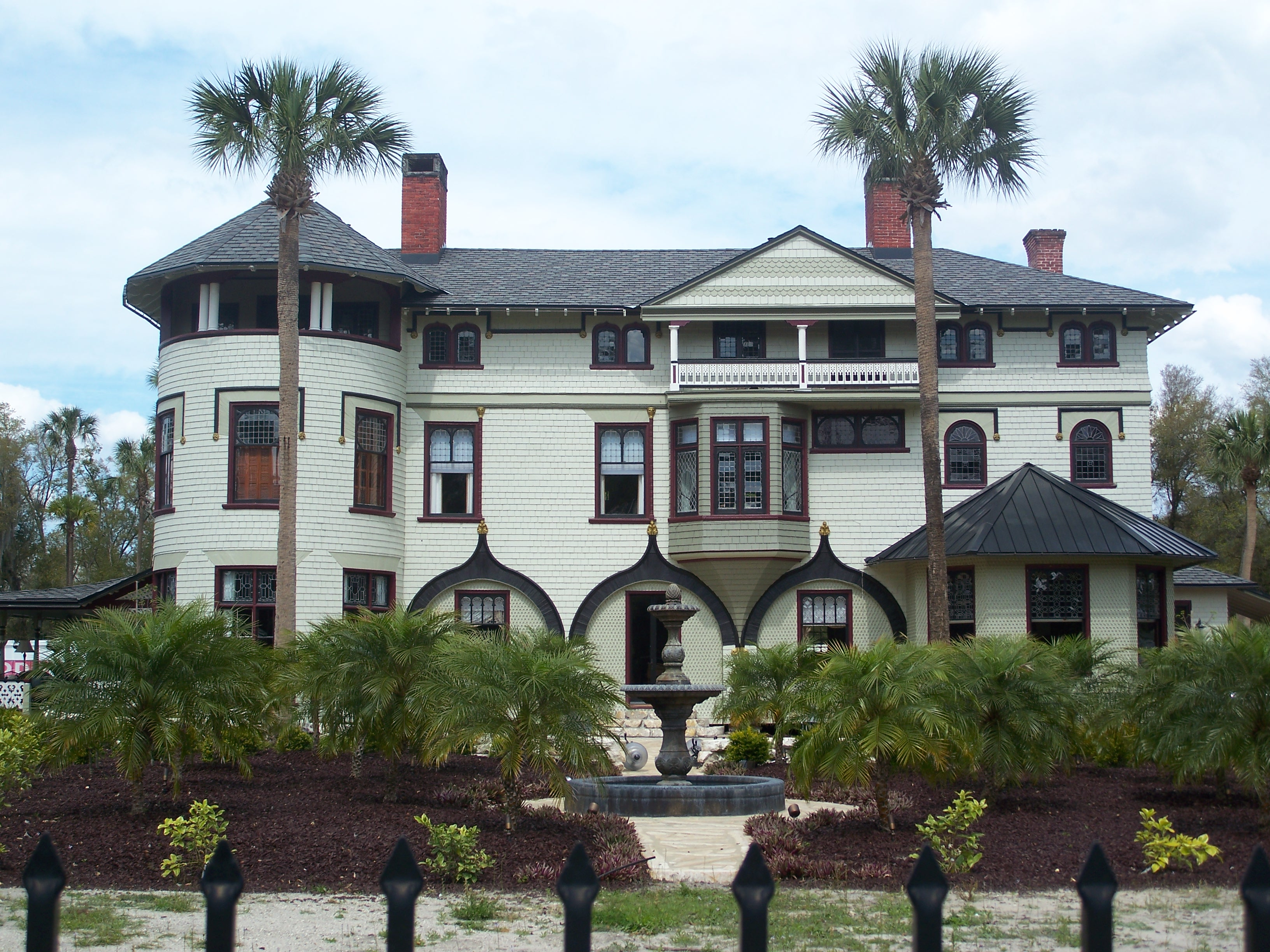
The John B. Stetson House in DeLand, Florida

Stetson owned an 8,000 ft^{2} (740 m^{2}) mansion in DeLand, Florida, known as the John B. Stetson House. It is a mixture of Gothic, Tudor, and Moorish styles, and is open to the public for tours. Stetson died in his mansion on February 18, 1906. He was originally interred at Laurel Hill Cemetery in Philadelphia and re-interred in West Laurel Hill Cemetery, Bala Cynwyd, Pennsylvania.

The John B. Stetson Middle School in Philadelphia was built in 1915 and named in his honor.
