= Stetson =

American hat brand

- Stetson logo

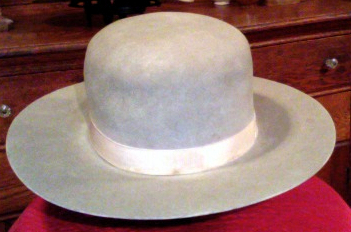
- Boss of the Plains hat
- Type: Private
- Industry: Retail
- Founded: 1865; 161 years ago
- Founder: John B. Stetson
- Website: stetson.com

Stetson is an American brand of hat manufactured by the John B. Stetson Company.

John B. Stetson gained inspiration for his most famous hats when he headed west from his native New Jersey for health reasons. On his return east in 1865, he founded the John B. Stetson Company in Philadelphia. He created a hat that has become symbolic of the pioneering American West, the "Boss of the Plains". This Western hat would become the cornerstone of Stetson's hat business and is still in production today.

Stetson eventually became the world's largest hat maker, producing more than 3,300,000 hats a year in a factory spread over 9 acres (36,000 m^{2}) in Philadelphia. In addition to its Western and fashion hats, Stetson also produces trucker hats, fragrance, apparel, footwear, eyewear, belts, bourbon, and other products evoking the historic American West.

Stetson University and Stetson University College of Law in Florida were named after John B. Stetson in 1899 for his contributions to the school. The university's athletic teams are known as the Hatters, and the official mascot is known as "John B."

== Prospector's hat ==
John B. Stetson was born in 1830 in Orange, New Jersey, where his father, Stephen Stetson, was a hatter. He worked in his father's shop until he went West for his health. Stetson created a rugged hat for himself made from thick beaver felt while panning for gold in Colorado. According to legend, Stetson invented the hat while on a hunting trip while showing his companions how he could make cloth out of fur without tanning. Fur felt hats are lighter, they maintain their shape, and withstand weather and renovation better.

Stetson made an unusually large hat from felt he made from hides collected on the trip and wore the hat for the remainder of the expedition. Although he initially wore it as a joke, Stetson soon grew fond of the hat for its ability to protect him from the elements. It had a wide brim, a high crown to keep an insulating pocket of air on the head, and was used to carry water.

As their travels continued, a cowboy is said to have seen J. B. Stetson and his unusual hat, rode up, tried the hat on for himself, and paid Stetson for it with a five dollar gold piece, riding off with the first western Stetson hat on his head.

== Boss of the Plains ==
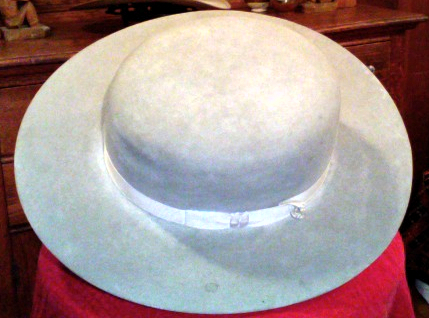
Boss of the Plains hat

Stetson's western adventures came to an end in 1865. Stetson, then 35 years old and in better health, returned east and established his own hat firm in Philadelphia, Pennsylvania, which produced high-quality hats for outdoor use. After producing some initial designs based on popular styles of the day, Stetson decided to create a hat based on his experiences in the American West, which he called the "Boss of the Plains". The high-crowned, wide-brimmed, soft-felt western hats that followed are intimately associated with the American cowboy image.

The original "Boss", manufactured by Stetson in 1865, was flat-brimmed, had a straight-sided crown with rounded corners. These lightweight, waterproof hats were natural in color, with four-inch crowns and brims. A plain hatband was fitted to adjust head size. The sweatband bore John B. Stetson's name.

== Mass production ==
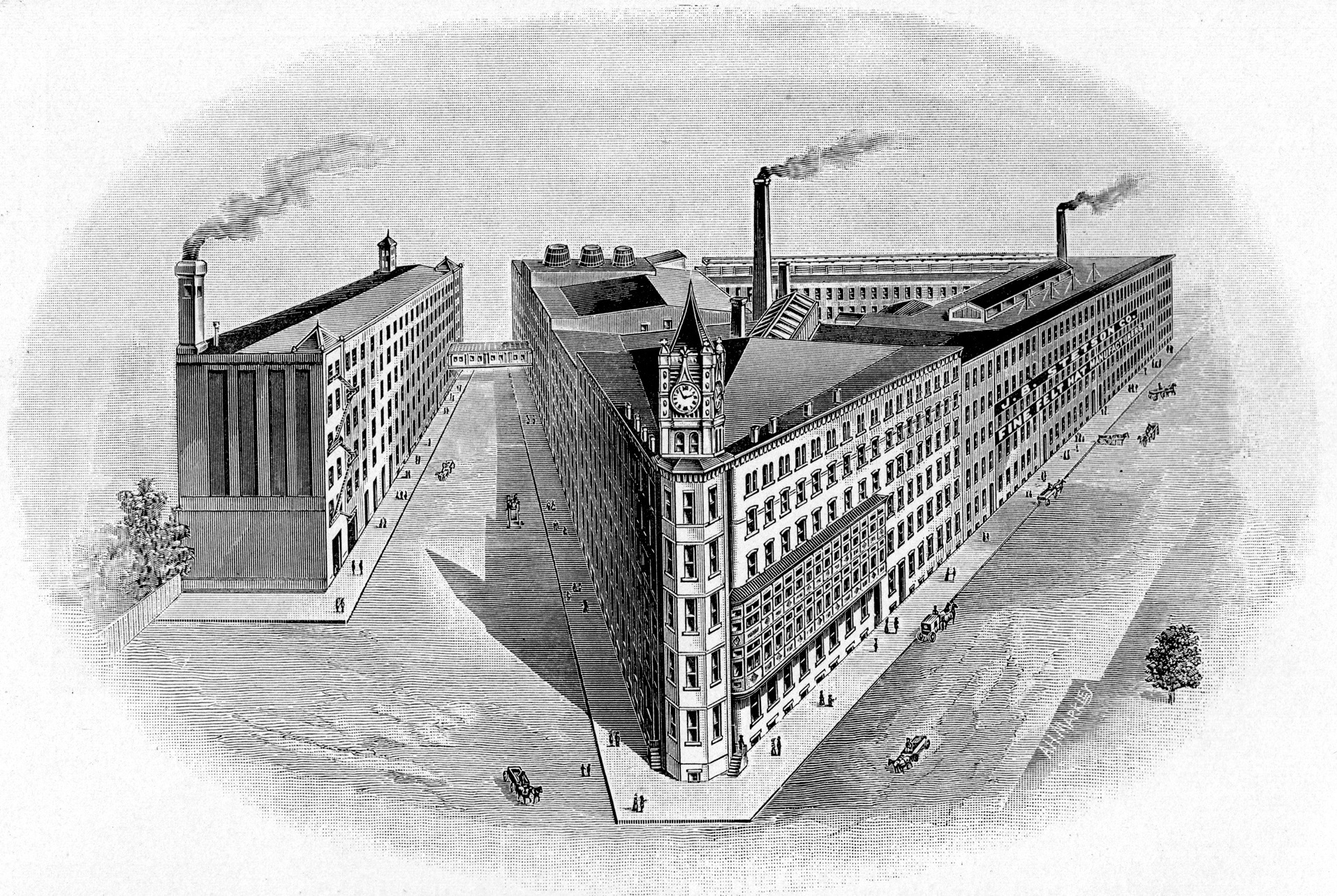
Stetson's nine-acre factory in Philadelphia (1894)

Stetson sent a sample hat to merchants throughout the Southwest with a letter asking for a minimum order of a dozen "Boss of the Plains" hats. The hat was an immediate success: in less than a year, Stetson set up a new factory in the outskirts of Philadelphia to handle his growing business. According to Bender, within a decade the name Stetson had become synonymous with the word "hat" almost everywhere in the West. By 1886, Stetson's hat company was the largest globally and had mechanized the hat-making industry ("producing close to 2 million hats a year by 1906"). The Stetson Hat Co. ceased production in 1968 and licensed another hat company. However, these hats still bear the Stetson name, with the hats produced in St. Joseph, Missouri. Later the license was transferred to another hat company in Texas.

"Today's cowboy hat has remained basically unchanged in construction and design since the first one was created in 1865 by J.B. Stetson."

Stetson also produced "dress" hats, distinguished from "western" hats by narrower brims and shorter crowns. However, his "Boss of the Plains" style hat and its many variants fueled the company's growth and fame.

== Singing cowboys and ten-gallon hats ==
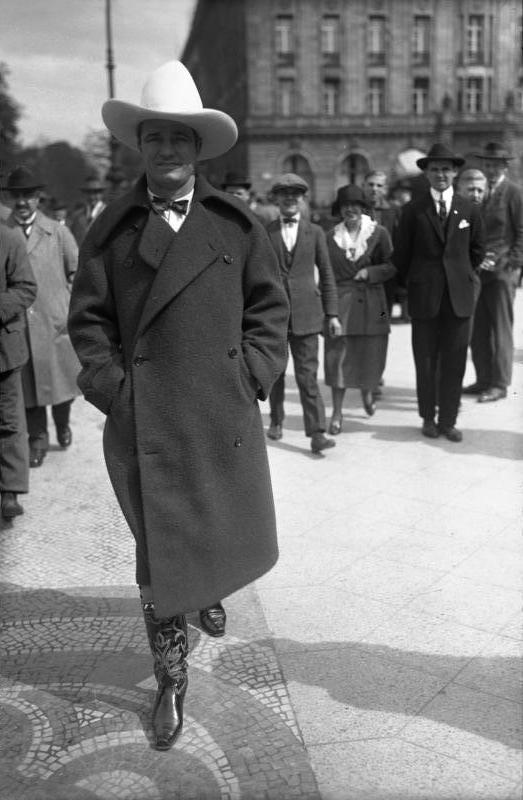
Tom Mix, an early 20th-century movie star, wearing a ten-gallon hat

In the 19th century and the first half of the 20th century, a hat was an indispensable item in every man's wardrobe. Stetson focused on expensive, high-quality hats that represented a real investment for the working cowboy and a statement of success for the city dweller.

Early on, Stetson hats became associated with legends of the West, including "Buffalo Bill", Calamity Jane, Will Rogers, and Annie Oakley. George Custer allegedly rode into the Battle of Little Big Horn wearing a Stetson. Later on, Western movie cowboys were quick to adopt the Stetson; many were drawn to the largest, most flamboyant styles available.

Texans were known for their preference for the "Ten Gallon" model. According to Win Blevins' Dictionary of the American West (p. 388), the term "ten-gallon" has nothing to do with the hat's liquid capacity but derives from the Spanish word galón (braid), ten indicating the number of braids used as a hatband. However, an early Stetson advertising image, a painting of a cowboy dipping his hat into a stream to provide water for his horse, symbolized the cowboy hat as an essential part of a stockman's gear and was later featured inside every western style hat.

== Changing fashions ==
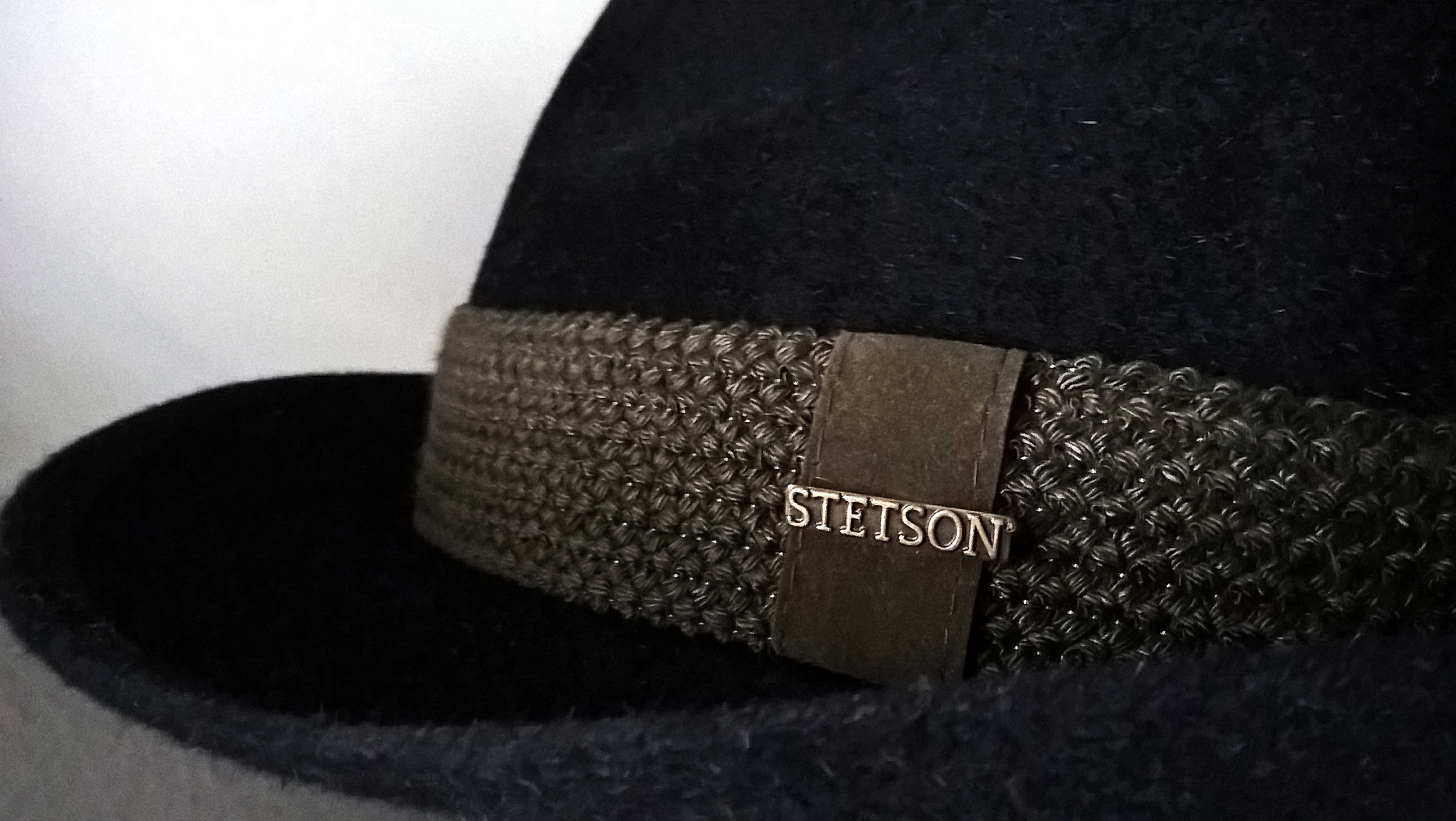
Stetson Royal

Stetson also produced women's hats, operating a millinery department from the 1930s to 1950s. Hat sales suffered during the Depression years, but Stetsons remained ubiquitous until Americans' embrace of headwear faded after WWII. Stetson had operations in Australia, Brazil, Colombia, Finland, Guatemala, Ireland, Japan, Mexico, New Zealand, Norway, South Africa, and West Germany at its peak.

In 1946, Stetson expanded operations to Danbury, Connecticut, known as "Hat City," purchasing the former Mallory Hat Co. facility. The company also acquired the Frank H. Lee Hat Co. in 1960. Hat production was consolidated in Danbury the following year, while finishing work remained in Philadelphia. By 1965, Stetson closed its Danbury plant.

Stetson changed its business strategy in the early 1970s, closing its Philadelphia factory in 1971 and continuing in the hat business through licensing arrangements with several manufacturers.

Popular demand for western-style hats spiked during the 1980s after the success of Indiana Jones and Urban Cowboy movies. Both western and dress hats continue to be popular men's accessories.

Salva Kiir, now-incumbent President of South Sudan, received a black Stetson hat as a gift from U.S. President George W. Bush in 2006. Since then, he continues to wear it as a key part of his public image, owning several other identical hats and rarely being seen without one.

=== Diversification ===
In the 1980s, Stetson began to diversify, releasing the first Stetson cologne in 1981 and Lady Stetson in 1986. Luggage, handbags, umbrellas, and scarves also carried the Stetson mark. Currently, the brand carries western hats, fashion hats, fragrances, eyewear, apparel, footwear, belts, accessories, and bourbon. Stetson is available in the United States, Canada, Mexico, Europe, and Asia.

== Military and police uniforms ==
=== United States ===
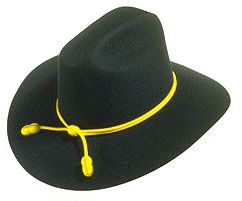
The Cavalry Stetson hat with non-commissioned officer (yellow) cord

The hat was first sold in Central City, Colorado, in 1865 in a style called the "Boss of the Plains." In some versions of the famous American folk ballad "Stagger Lee," Billy Lyons is killed by Stack A Lee over a Stetson hat. Troopers of modern-day U.S. Army cavalry regiments will often wear a Cavalry Stetson on ceremonial occasions in place of the ACU patrol cap or beret.

The Homicide and Robbery Bureau of the Dallas Police used the Stetson hat as a badge of office.

In addition, on April Fools' Day, 2011, the U.S. Army released a humorous statement that the official black beret of the Army would be replaced by Stetsons. The statement was supplemented by pictures of soldiers with Stetsons photoshopped over their berets, including an Army dog toting a Stetson.

The Legion of Frontiersmen created in 1905 in England also wore the Stetson, as well as the South African Constabulary, organized by Robert Baden-Powell in 1901.

=== Canadian military ===
In the Second Boer War, the flat-brimmed Stetson became the standard issue of the 2nd Canadian Contingent, becoming recognized throughout the British Empire as a symbol of Canada. Twelve hundred Canadian troops were part of the South African Constabulary under the leadership of Robert Baden-Powell, and it was after seeing these troops in action at the Relief of Mafeking that Baden-Powel ordered 10,000 of these hats for the British Troops under his command.

=== Canadian police ===
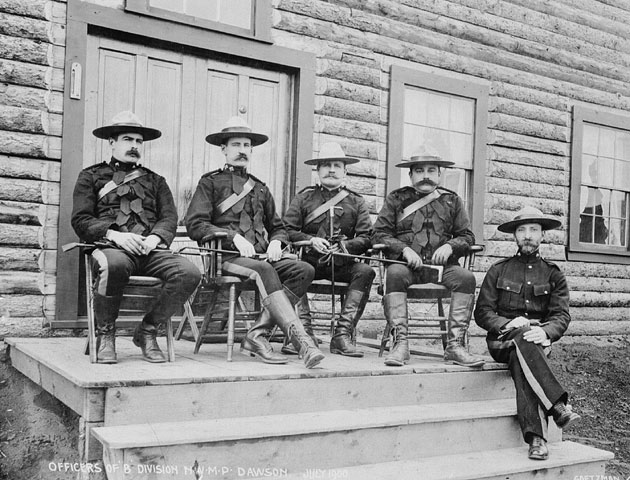
North-West Mounted Police officers, Yukon, 1900, wearing the famous scarlet uniform that includes a flat-brimmed Stetson hat with a Montana Crease.

The Royal Canadian Mounted Police (RCMP) Red Serge dress uniform includes a Stetson with a flat brim. The Stetson was first used unofficially by the North-West Mounted Police, in place of the traditional white pith helmet, not practical for the Canadian West. The color for the RCMP Stetson is sometimes referred to as "Belgian Belly"; it is a reddish buff, pastel-like color of the underfur of the Belgian hare. It is also a very little-used "second name" for the Stetson. Although called a Stetson, the hat type is similar to a campaign hat.

The Ontario Provincial Police also wore the Stetson (grey woven fabric) as part of their uniform from 1909 to 1930s and again from 1997 to 2009.

The Calgary Police Service may wear a black Stetson as an optional part of their uniform, reflecting the city's western roots and cowboy heritage. Although worn by some officers year-round, the hat is especially prominent during the Calgary Stampede.

== See also ==
- Akubra
- Tyrolean hat
- List of hat styles
- List of headgear
