= Resistol =

Hat manufacturer

Coordinates: 32°54′28.2″N 96°39′14.6″W

Resistol Hats is a Garland, Texas, United States–based manufacturer of hats. The company is best known as a maker of cowboy hats. The company has long been an important part of Garland's manufacturing base. The company is reportedly well diversified and makes a wide array of hat types, including safari and baseball styles.

"If you are among those behatted hordes and live in Texas, chances are yours is a Resistol," wrote Peter Applebome in Texas Monthly. "Based in Garland, Resistol sells about a million cowboy hats a year, ranging in price from $15 for a straw workingman's special to $3000 for a beaver-and-ermine number. The cowboy hat may be the single most resonant throwback to the glory days of the open range, the one thing that most says "Texas" to the rest of the world."

Among the celebrities who have worn a Resistol are actors John Wayne and Henry Fonda; country singer George Strait; United States presidents Lyndon B. Johnson and Ronald Reagan; and legendary Dallas Cowboys' coach Tom Landry, who wore the company's trademark dress hats. Also, the Texas Department of Public Safety troopers wear Resistol hats as part of their uniform. These are made in a custom color called Textan.

== History ==
The company was founded by E.R. Byer and Harry Rolnick, who established Byer-Rolnick in Dallas, Texas, in 1927. At the time, the company produced men's felt hats. The company used the name "Resistol Hats" to indicate that the hats could "resist all" weather conditions. Some accounts contend the name was given because the headbands in the company's hats were more resistant to scalp oil. Eventually, the growing firm needed to expand. In 1938, it moved to a larger facility in Garland, Texas, where Resistol hats continue to be manufactured today. For decades, residents surrounding the hat factory could set their clocks to its whistle.

During the President Johnson administration, gifts of Western-style hats were a diplomatic gesture. In 1967 or 1968, clothing company Koret of California (then named Koracorp Industries) bought the Byer-Rolnick Hat Corporation. Koracorp was later bought by Levi Strauss & Co. in 1979. Riding on the cowboy craze of the late 1970s, "Resistol put its factories on 24-hour shifts, and its business doubled in three years. But booms do have a tendency to go bust, and by 1982, the cowboy hat had become last year's Nehru jacket," according to Applebome. In 1985, Levi sold the Resistol brand to businessman Irving Joel. Since 2009, Pro Equine Group has owned Resistol.
