= Searchmont, Ontario =

Coordinates: 46°47′N 84°03′W

The town of Searchmont received its name in honor of T. C. Search, the treasurer of the consolidated Lake Superior Company. Searchmont was once a bustling community built around the forestry industry. The local sawmill was the livelihood of most of the residents. When the mill closed in the early 1990s, much of the population moved away.

The Searchmont Community Centre was renovated in 2002 with the aid of a SuperBuild grant provided by the Ontario government. Part of the Centre has been named after Walter Senko, a recently deceased school teacher in the area.

A designated place in Statistics Canada census data, Searchmont had a population of 300 in the Canada 2006 Census.

Searchmont Fire Hall and Community Centre 2003

Fire Response and Emergency First Response services are provided by the Searchmont Community Volunteer Fire Department. The original Searchmont Fire Brigade was formed in 1976 with a grant of $15,000 from the Isolated Communities Assistance Fund along with $8,000 raised by the community. The brigade was able to purchase a pumper truck, 2 portable fire pumps, protection clothing and breathing apparatus at that time. The current SCVFD hosts an annual Fireman's Ball each spring as a local fundraiser and to provide an opportunity for the community to recognize the individual volunteer efforts provided.

== Searchmont Resort ==
Searchmont Resort is a ski resort located in Searchmont, and mainly caters to residents of Sault Ste. Marie, Ontario, and Algoma, which is 45 minutes away. The area has a 703 vertical foot drop, featuring 26 runs and six lifts (one quad, three triple, and two belt lifts).

== Demographics ==
In the 2021 Census of Population conducted by Statistics Canada, Searchmont had a population of 445 living in 214 of its 430 total private dwellings, a change of 13.5% from its 2016 population of 392. With a land area of 374.74 km^{2} (144.69 sq mi), it had a population density of 1.2/km^{2} (3.1/sq mi) in 2021.
