= Theodore C. Search =

American businessman

Theodore Corsson Search (1841–1920) was a businessman who was the president of the National Association of Manufacturers, founder of Philadelphia University, and managing director of the Stetson Company.

== See also ==
- Searchmont, Ontario
- Searchmont Motor Company
