= John B. Stetson Company =

Defunct maker of the Stetson cowboy hats

Coordinates: 39.9778°N 75.1417°W

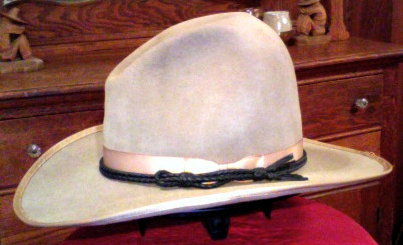
1920s Stetson side view

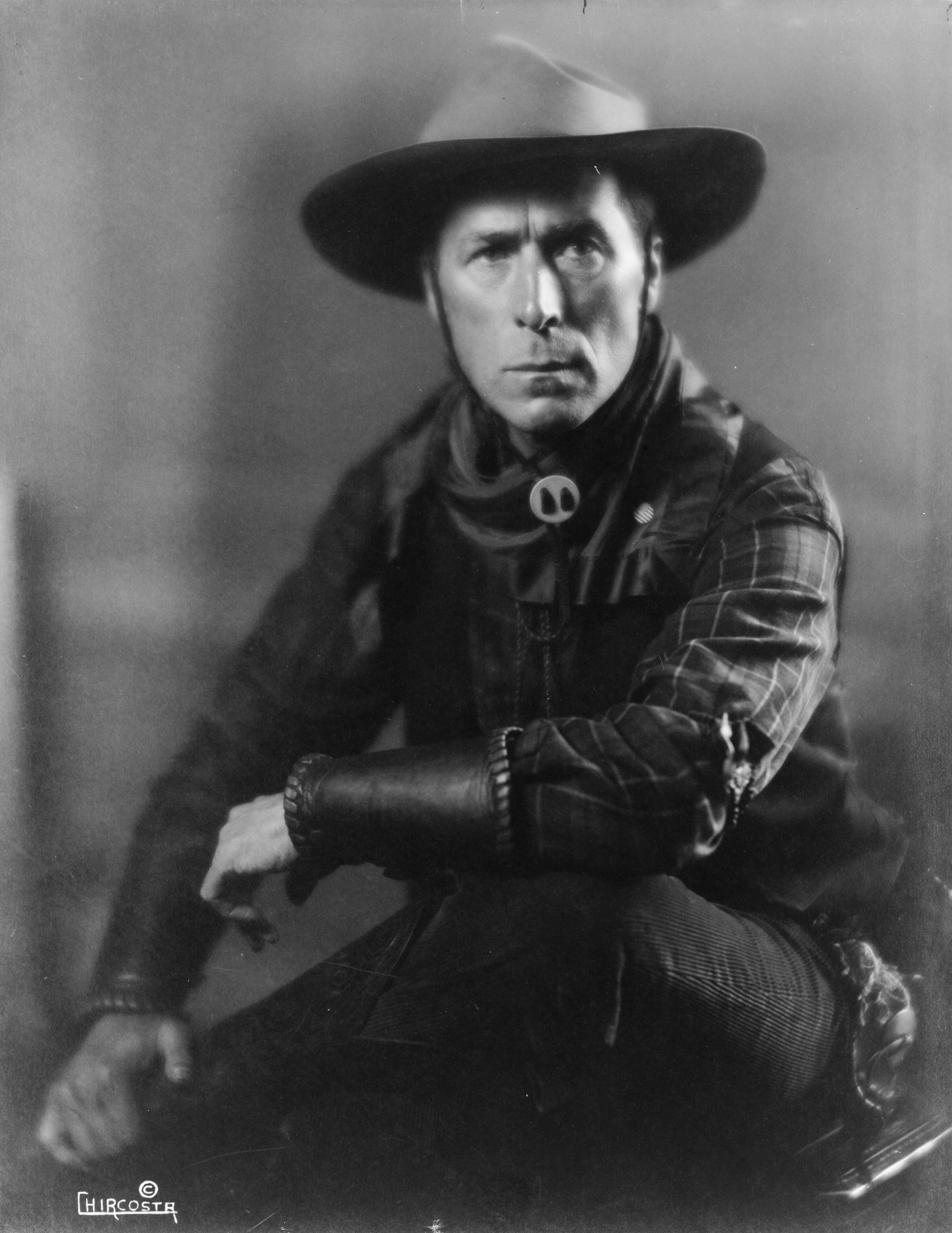
William S. Hart

The John B. Stetson Company, founded by John B. Stetson in 1865, was the maker of the Stetson cowboy hats, but ceased manufacturing in 1970. Stetson hats are now being manufactured in Garland, Texas, by Hatco, Inc., who also produce Resistol and Charlie 1 Horse hats.

Stetson resumed manufacturing in the 1980s, but the company went bankrupt in 1986. The factory equipment and the license to manufacture Stetson hats was purchased by Hat Brands, a company owned by Irving Joel.

== History ==
The John B. Stetson Company was established in Philadelphia, Pennsylvania, in 1865 when John B. Stetson decided to mass-produce a hat like one he had fashioned for himself out of necessity during a lengthy Western expedition. Stetson's Boss of the Plains, with its high crown and wide flat brim, became the prototype for all other cowboy hat designs. A factory in St. Joseph, Missouri, produced Stetson hats until parent company, Hatco Inc., closed it in 2004. The second factory in Galveston, Texas, continues to turn out the "Boss of the Plains," along with over 100 variations for men and women.

=== The early years ===
The Philadelphia factory, incorporated in 1891, produced dress hats for both women and men. Employing over 5,000 workers in various departments, the company turned out more hats than any other during the early 20th century.

The Stetson Company was considered especially innovative for its time. The production of high-quality hat boxes became associated with the Stetson name. These hat boxes depicted Christmas imagery or famous Philadelphia institutions. The company also spread its reputation using marketing techniques and the recording of industrial films promoting its process and product. Hats and copies of the film Birth of a Hat, produced by the Company itself and showing the hat-making process, were distributed to merchants and popular conventions where feedback was recorded and used to make future product.

The first significant change in the Company occurred after John B. Stetson's death in February 1906. His position as president of the company was filled by J. Howell Cummings.

=== The later years ===
Stetson sales declined dramatically in the 1950s and 1960s. Between 1947 and 1968, revenues sharply dropped from around 29 million dollars to about 8 million dollars. Members of John B. Stetson's family eventually decided to sell company stock. Ira Guilden, who controlled Ramco Enterprises Inc., came into conflict with the Stetson family, although by 1968 he would have majority interest in the Stetson Company.

In the early 1970s, the factory in Philadelphia shut down. Even though the clock tower, gymnasium, auditorium, and fitting room were saved from destruction, they burned down in 1980.

== Paternalism ==
John B. Stetson quickly gained a reputation as an employer driven by religious morals. He ran the Stetson Company in a paternalistic fashion designed to provide benefits for workers, increase profits, and discourage unionization. The Stetson Company provided many benefits for the time such as prizes, Christmas bonuses, shared stock, pensions, and membership to a building association as well as access to Stetson facilities. These facilities serviced several aspects of an employee's life. In the early 1900s, Stetson added a company library, dentist, hospital, auditorium, and athletic fields for recreational use. The John B. Stetson Building Association assisted over 1,000 employees to purchase homes, and over 2,000 children of employees attended Sunday School or Kindergarten on company grounds.

One of the most anticipated events at the Company surrounded the Christmas holiday. Employees gathered at the factory auditorium for an annual celebration that featured speeches from the Company President or Santa Claus, and a distribution of awards, bonuses, and gifts. These gifts and awards varied according to one's position at the company. Women received candy and gloves, married men received a Christmas turkey, and unmarried men were given hats.

== Employees ==
Many Stetson employees were immigrant hat-makers with reputations of moving around where work was plentiful. The Stetson Company, to encourage yearlong work and a high retention rate, offered immigrants a portion of annual earnings as a Christmas bonus, increasing each successive year. Some of these immigrant workers were able to learn English and become U.S. citizens, partly due to the "Americanization" classes the Company offered.

Highly specialized positions in the factory utilized the apprentice system. Those recruited to an apprenticeship signed contracts valid until they had reached eighteen years old or completed three years of work. While under contract, they agreed to abstain from gambling or marriage. Pay was two dollars per week with an additional dollar for every week worked after the contract was fulfilled. Many apprentices became full-time employees and had the potential to become a foreman due to their loyalty to the Stetson brand.

=== Unions ===
John B. Stetson's tradition of providing annual bonuses, Christmas gifts, and facilities for employees were an active attempt to dissuade unions. However, there was a sizable number of union workers at the Philadelphia factory during the early 1900s. They were ordered to leave the factory by their union and work at shops instead. Some of these workers demanded to stay on until Christmas when they received their bonuses and this was generally allowed. However, the attraction of an end of year bonus was so great that many returned to the factory as non-union workers.
