= Cowboy hat =

Large hat associated with cowboys

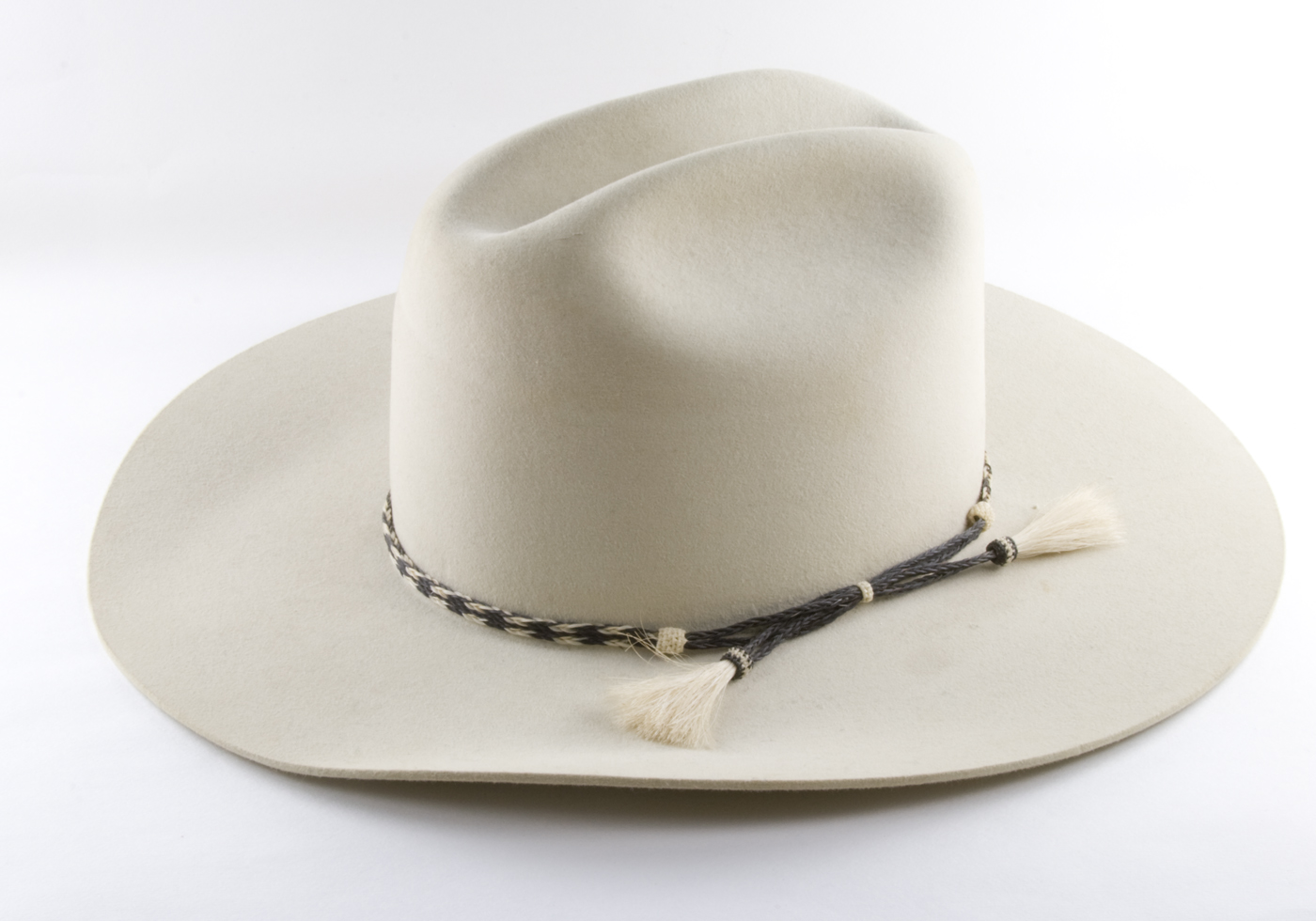
A felt cowboy hat

The cowboy hat is a high-crowned, wide-brimmed hat best known as the defining piece of attire for the North American cowboy. Today it is worn by many people, and is particularly associated with ranch workers in the United States, Canada, Mexico, Central America and Brazil, station workers in Australia and New Zealand, with many country, regional Mexican and sertanejo music performers, and with participants in the North American rodeo circuit. It is recognized around the world as part of traditional Old West apparel.

The cowboy hat as known today has many antecedents to its design, including Mexican hats such as the sombrero, the various designs of wide-brimmed hats worn by farmers and stockmen in the eastern United States, as well as the designs used by the United States Cavalry.

The first western model was the open-crowned "Boss of the Plains", and after that came the front-creased Carlsbad, destined to become the most prominent cowboy style. The high-crowned, wide-brimmed, soft-felt western hats that followed are intimately associated with the cowboy image.

== History ==
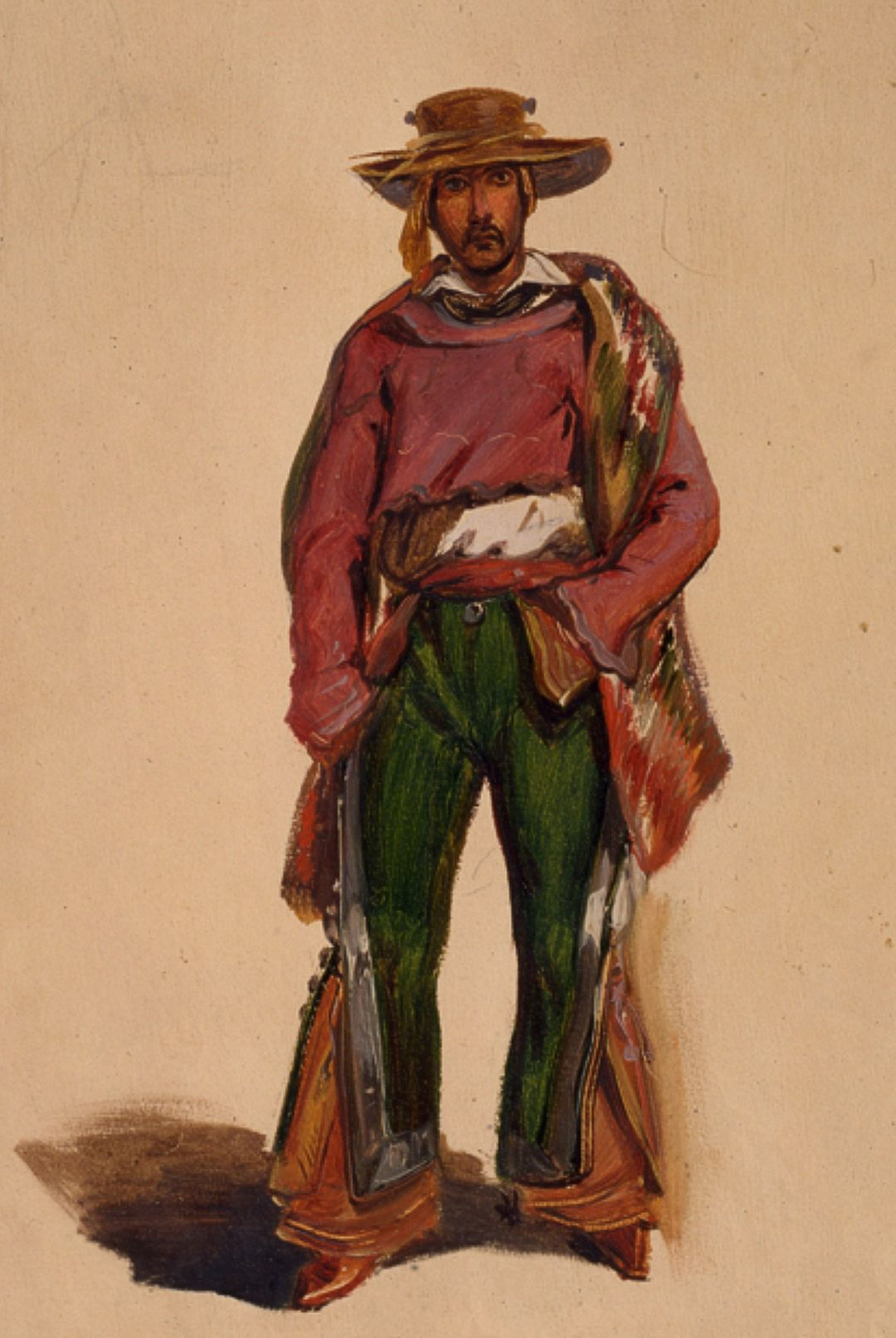
Typical Mexican sombrero of the 1830s to 1850s.

Cowboy hats, like the sombreros of Mexico, were designed in response to the demands of the physical environment. High crowns provide insulation from the heat, and wide brims provide shade. Hot and sunny climates inspire such tall-crowned, wide-brimmed designs, and hats with one or both of these features have evolved again and again in history and across cultures. For example, the Greek petasos of two millennia ago, and the traditional conical hat widespread in different regions of Asia – and worn into modern times – incorporate such heat-mitigating features. (Note: Attributed to multiple sources.) Inclusion in headgear for riders on horseback can be seen at least as far back as the Mongolian horsemen of the 13th century. (Note: Attributed to multiple sources.)

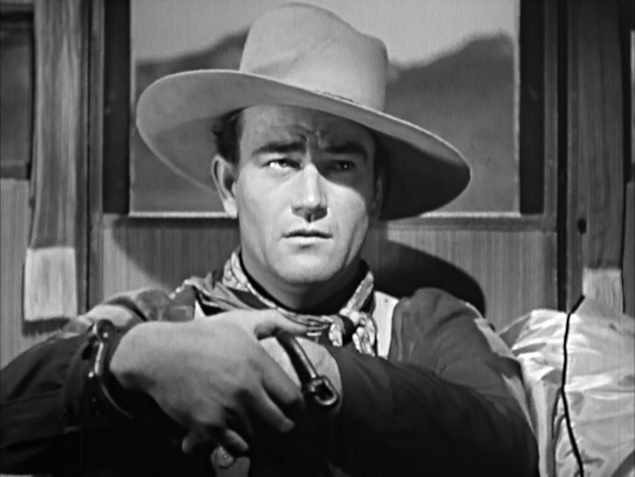
John Wayne in a cowboy hat in Stagecoach (1939)

It is not clear when the cowboy hat received its name. European-Americans in the Western United States originally had no standard headwear. People moving West wore many styles of hat, including top hats, bowlers, Civil War headgear such as cavalry and slouch hats, and sailor hats.

Various styles of American cowboy hats evolved from Mexican hats like the sombrero charro, torro hats and sombreros calentanos. While modern Mexican cowboys adopted the American style cowboy hats and modified it to have smaller brims and higher crowns. According to historian of Americana Lucius Beebe, the bowler was the most widely-worn hat in the American West, prompting him to assert, in contradiction to popular belief, that the bowler, not the cowboy hat, was "the hat that won the West". The working cowboy wore wide-brimmed and high-crowned hats. The hats were most likely adopted from Civil-War-era slouch hats that were commonly worn by Confederate soldiers who lacked the official uniform and kepi hat of the Union army; they may have also been influenced by the Mexican vaqueros before the invention of the modern design. John Batterson Stetson is credited for originating the modern-day American cowboy hat.

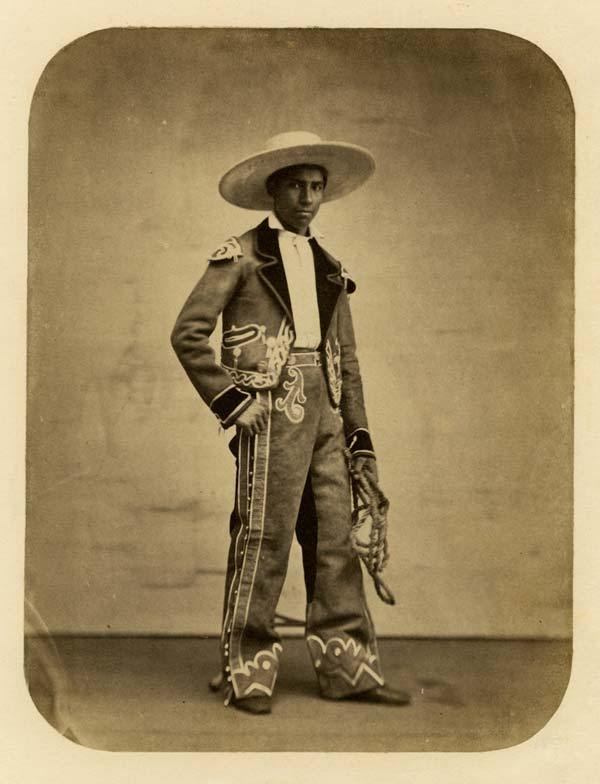
Typical Mexican charro hat of the 1850s and 1860s which may have influenced John B. Stetson

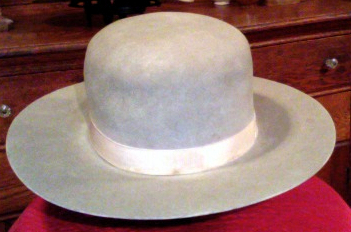
A Boss of the Plains hat

The original "Boss of the Plains", manufactured by Stetson in 1865, was flat-brimmed, had a straight sided crown, with rounded corners. These light-weight, waterproof hats were natural in color, with four-inch crowns and brims. A plain hatband was fitted to adjust head size. The sweatband bore Stetson's name. There was only one style of hat, but they were made in different qualities ranging from one-grade material at five dollars apiece to pure beaver felt hats for thirty dollars each. J. B. Stetson was the first to market the "Boss of the Plains" to cowboys, and it has remained the universal image of the American West. The charisma of the West was carried back East when adventurers returned in the expensive "Boss of the Plains"-style hat.

The cowboy hat has been adopted as a regional identifier among Māori tribes (iwi) living in Gisborne District of New Zealand's North Island collectively called "Ngā Kaupoi" ('the cowboys') for their native adoption of horses; one of its resident politicians, Rawiri Waititi, is well known for his hat-donning appearance. Hawaii's paniolo wear papale woven from pandanus leaves taken directly from the design of the Mexican sombrero.

== Design ==
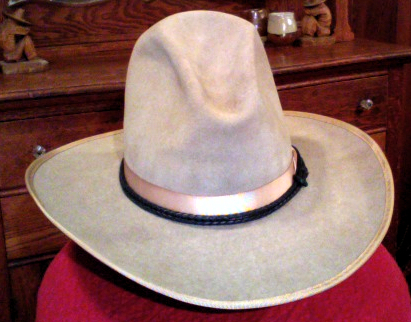
Stetson hat manufactured in the 1920s

Modern cowboy hats are made of fur-based felt, straw or, less often, leather. They are sold with a tall, rounded crown and a wide flat brim. They have a simple sweat band on the inside to stabilize the fit of the head, and usually a small decorative hat band on the outside of the crown. Hats are customized by creasing the crown and rolling the brim. Hats are also sold pre-creased and pre-rolled. Often a more decorative hat band is added. In some places, "stampede strings" or "wind strings" are also attached. Hats can be manufactured in virtually any color, but are most often seen in shades of beige, brown and black. Beginning in the 1940s, pastel colors were introduced, seen often on hats worn by movie cowboys and rodeo riders. "Today's cowboy hat has remained basically unchanged in construction and design since the first one was created in 1865 by J. B. Stetson."

== Modern designs ==
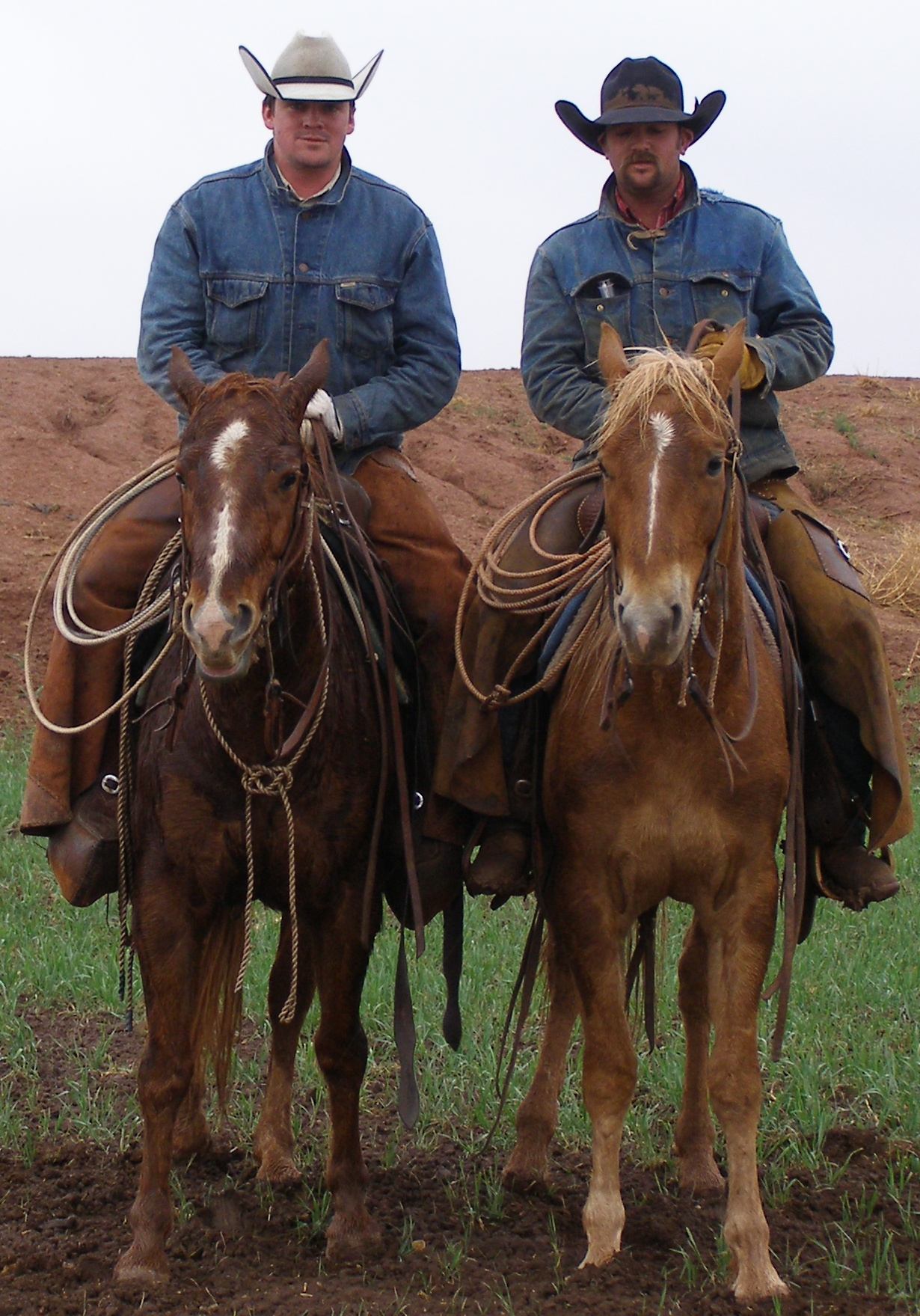
Modern working cowboys wearing cowboy hats. While providing less protection from the sun, their turned-up brims prevent them from being as easily knocked off during lasso use.

The modern cowboy hat has remained basically unchanged in construction and underlying design since the Stetson creation. The cowboy hat quickly identified its wearer as someone associated with the West. "Within a decade the name 'John B. Stetson' became synonymous with the word 'hat' in every corner and culture west of the Mississippi River." The shape of the hat's crown and brim were often modified by the wearer for fashion and to protect against weather by being softened in hot steam, shaped, and allowed to dry and cool. Because of the ease of personalization, it was often possible to tell where a cowboy hat was from, right down to which ranch, simply by looking at the crease in the crown. Common modern hat creases include the classic Cattleman crease, Cool Hand Luke, Minick, Brick, and the Gus.

Later as the mystique of the Wild West was popularized by entertainers such as Buffalo Bill and western films starring actors such as Tom Mix, the Cowboy hat came to symbolize the American West. John Wayne christened them "the hat that won the West". The Boss of the Plains design influenced various wide-brimmed hats worn by farmers and ranchers all over the United States. Later designs were customized for law enforcement, military and motion pictures.

The first American law-enforcement agency to adopt Stetson's western hat as part of their uniform was the Texas Rangers. The Texas Legislature designated the cowboy hat as the official "State Hat of Texas" in 2015.

== Variations ==
=== Ten-gallon hat ===
Some unusually large cowboy hats are referred to as "ten-gallon" hats. The term came into use about 1925. There are multiple theories for how the concept arose.

One theory is that the term "ten-gallon" is a corruption of the Spanish modifier tan galán, which loosely translates as "really handsome" or "so fine". For example, "un sombrero tan galán" translates as "such a fine hat".

Another theory is that the term "ten-gallon" is a corruption of the Spanish term galón, which means "galloon", a type of narrow braided trim around the crown, possibly a style adapted by Spanish cowboys. When Texas cowboys misunderstood the word galón for "gallon", the popular, though incorrect, legend may have been born. According to Reynolds and Rand, "The term ten-gallon did not originally refer to the holding capacity of the hat, but to the width of a Mexican sombrero hatband, and is more closely related to this unit of measurement by the Spanish than to the water-holding capacity of a Stetson."

Early print advertising by Stetson showed a cowboy giving his horse a drink of water from a hat. The Stetson company notes that a "ten-gallon" (38 liters) hat holds only 3/4 US gallon (2.8 L).

=== Calgary White Hat ===
The Calgary White Hat is a white felt cowboy hat which is the symbol of both the Calgary Stampede annual rodeo and the city of Calgary. Created by Morris Shumiatcher, owner of Smithbilt Hat Company, it was worn for the first time at the 1946 Stampede. In the early 1950s, Mayor of Calgary Donald Hugh Mackay began presenting the white hat to visiting dignitaries, a tradition that the office of the mayor continues to this day. Thousands of tourists and groups also participate in "white hatting ceremonies" conducted by Tourism Calgary and by volunteer greeters at the Calgary International Airport. In 1983, the Calgary White Hat was incorporated into the design of the flag of Calgary.

== See also ==
- Akubra
- Calgary White Hat
- Campaign hat
- Chupalla
- Cowboy boot
- Equestrian helmet
- Fedora
- Fulani hat
- Hardee hat
- List of hat styles
- John B. Stetson Company
- Resistol
- Slouch hat
- Sun hat
- Western wear
