= Laurie Winn Carlson =

American children's storybook author

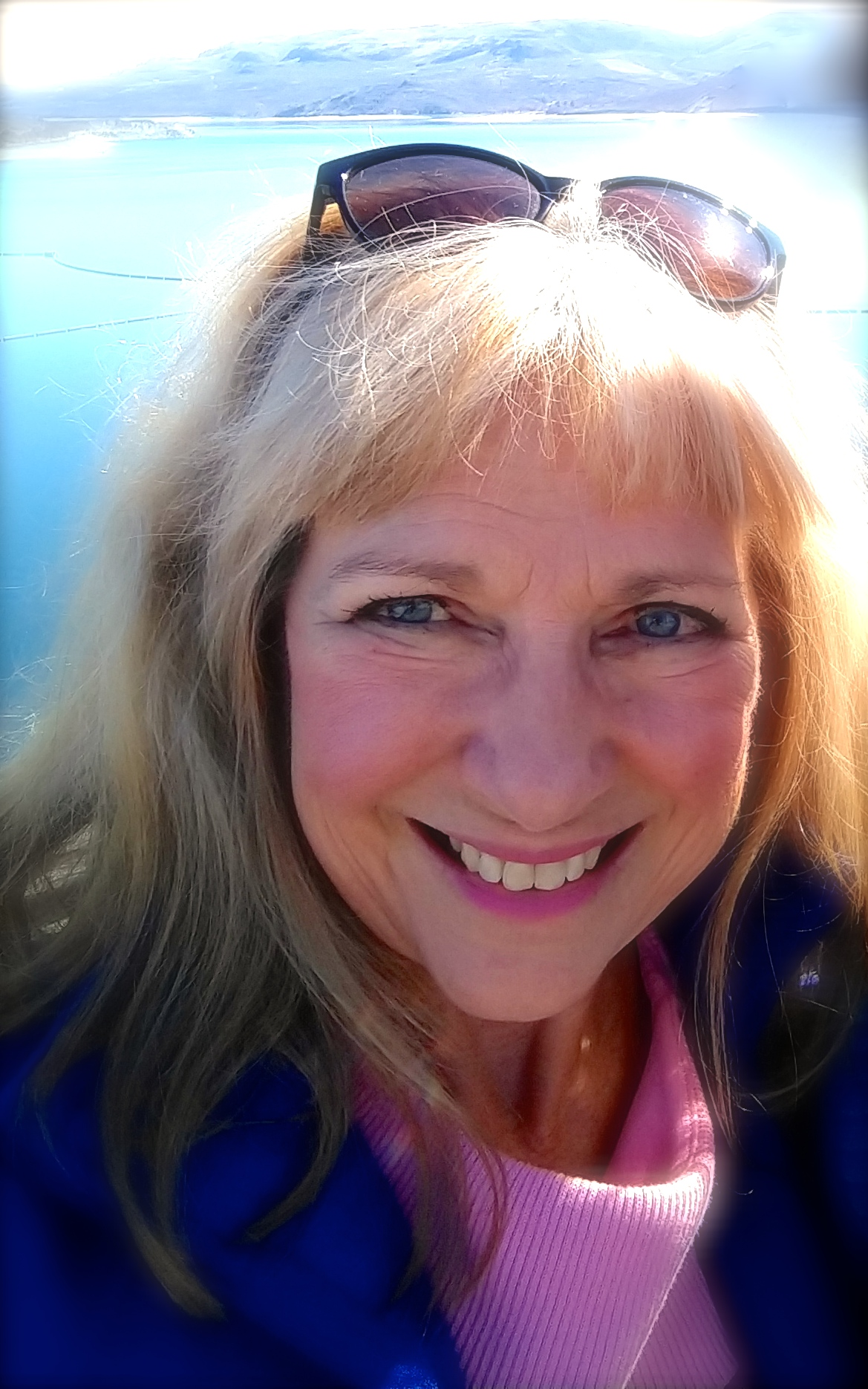
- Self-portrait photograph
- Born: January 27, 1952 (age 74); Sonora, California
- Writing career
- Genre: Children's literature

Laurie Winn Carlson (born January 27, 1952) is an American children's storybook author. She currently lives in Hayden, Idaho. Carlson believes that medically-explained symptoms from girls involved in the Salem witch trials were later blamed on witches, as the doctor failed to find a medically reasonable cause.

== Books ==
- Carlson, Laurie M.; Carlson, Laurie Winn (2000). A Fever in Salem: A New Interpretation of the New England Witch Trials. ISBN 978-1-5666-3253-9.
- Carlson, Laurie M. (2000). Boss of the Plains: The Hat that Won the West. ISBN 978-0-7894-2657-4.
- Carlson, Laurie M.; Carlson, Laurie Winn (2002). Cattle: An Informal Social History. ISBN 978-1-5666-3455-7.
