= Chupalla =

Traditional Chilean horseman's straw hat

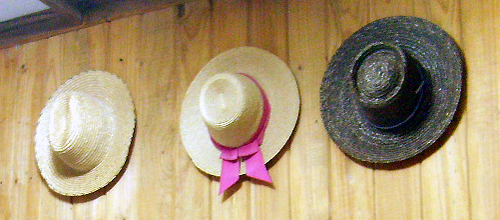
Chupallas (Chile)

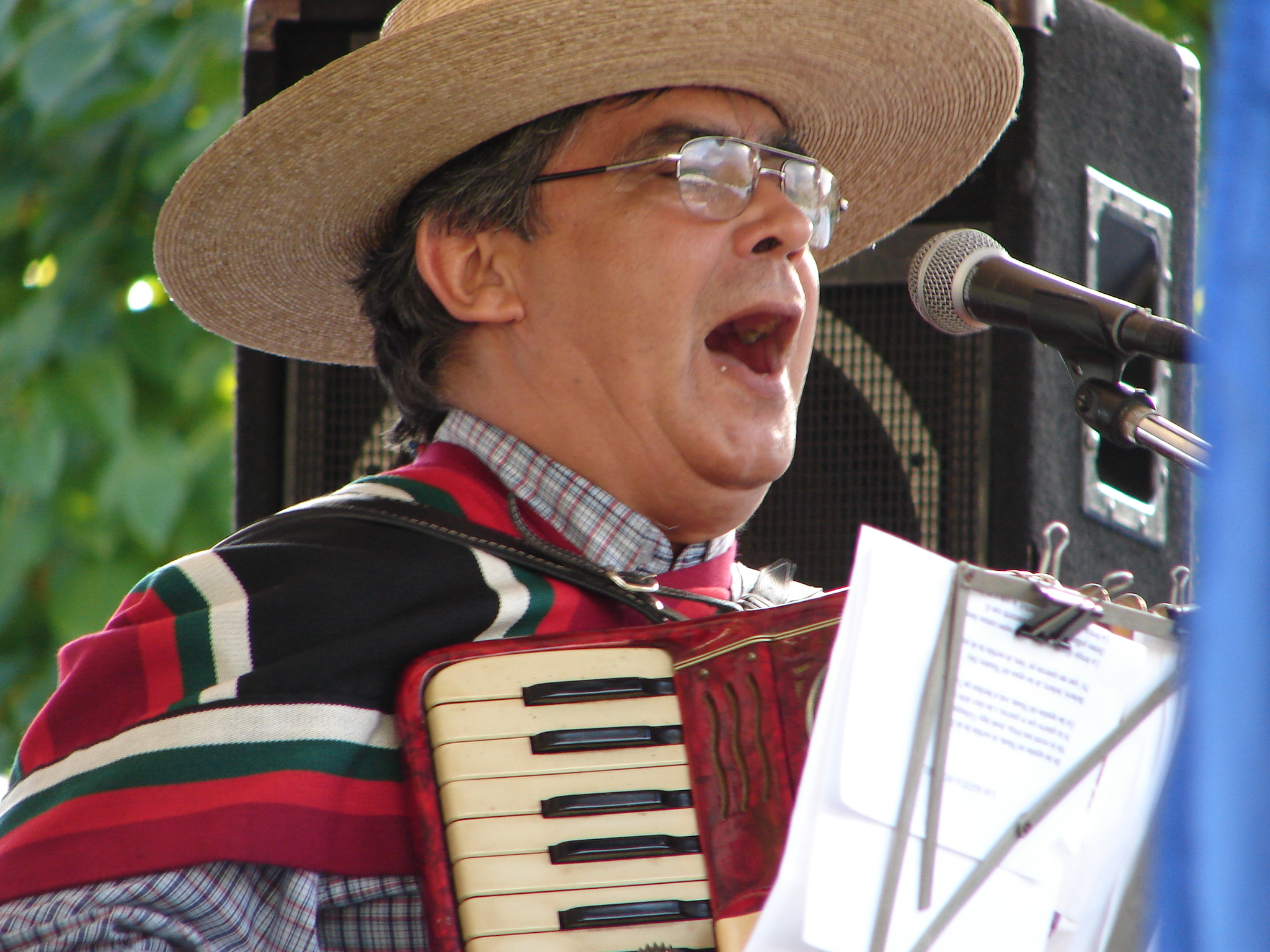
Huaso wearing a chupalla while singing in the Fiestas Patrias celebrations

The chupalla (Spanish pronunciation: [tʃuˈpaʎa]) is a traditional Chilean horseman's hat made of straw. Many people in rural areas of Central Chile use it as well. In addition, it is often used when dancing the cueca (a Chilean folk dance) and during Chilean rodeos.

The name chupalla comes from achupalla, a local name given to a bromelia plant that was used to make these hats. Today, chupallas are made of various types of straw, including rice and wheat.

The phrase "por la chupalla" may be heard frequently in Chile, especially from the elderly. It is an interjection which is equivalent to the phrase "for Pete's sake!".

The chupalla has a flat top and a perfectly circular rim.

== See also ==
- List of hat styles
