= Cavalry Stetson =

Traditional cavalry headgear in the United States Army

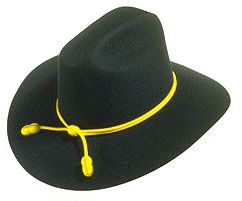
The Cavalry Stetson hat with non-commissioned officer (yellow) cord

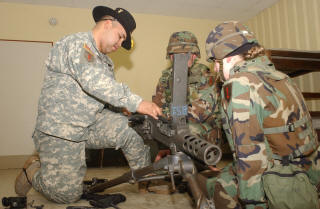
A spur holder with the 4th Cavalry Regiment instructs candidates on the assembly of an M2 machine gun after their first try during the "2006 Spur Ride"

The Cavalry Stetson is a cavalry traditional headgear within the United States Army, typical worn by cavalrymen in the late 1860s, named after its creator John B. Stetson.

In the modern U.S. Army, the Stetson was revived as an unofficial headgear for the sake of esprit de corps in the cavalry. Because they are not authorized by AR 670–1 (the regulation for wear and appearance of the uniform), wear and use of the Stetson and associated spurs is regulated by a unit commander. What follows is one example of a cavalry squadron's policy on the wear of Stetsons:

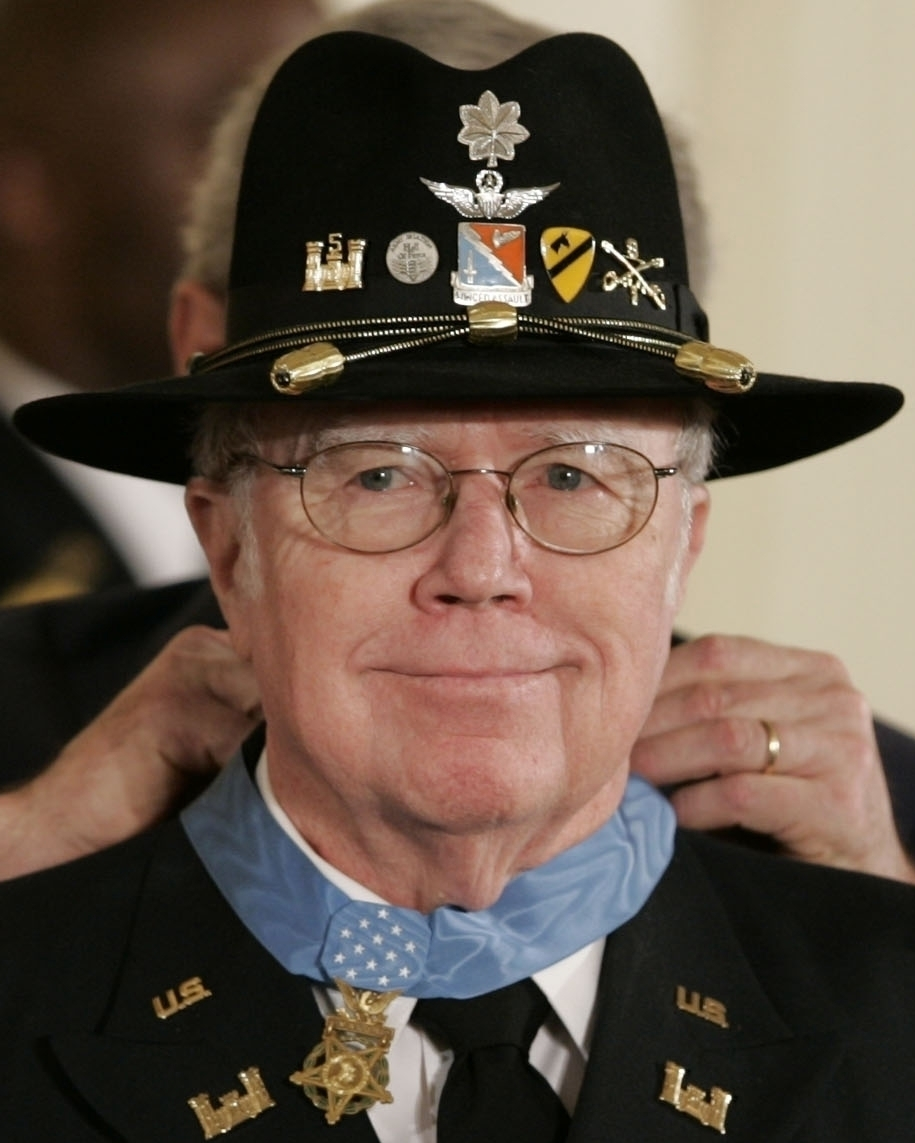
LTC Bruce P. Crandall (Ret.) wearing Stetson with gold and black cord during his Medal of Honor ceremony at the White House, 2008

Stetson: The Stetson will be black in color. Rank and regimental or ordinary cavalry brass will adorn the Stetson. The braid will be worn around the base of the Stetson. Troopers will wear the appropriate braid color. Braid ends or acorns will be to the front of the Stetson and no more than an acorn length over the brim. Crossed sabers will be placed on the front of the Stetson. Organizational sabers are authorized if assigned or affiliated to the regiment. Rank will be worn 1/8" from the bottom of the sabers, centered.

a. General Officers: Solid Gold
b. Field Grade and Company Grade Officers: Gold and Black
c. Warrant Officer:

1: CW4, CW5 - Solid Silver
2: WO1, CW2, CW3 - Silver and Black

d. Non-Commissioned Officer: Yellow

1: The nape strap will be threaded through the appropriate eyelets in the brim of the Stetson so that strap goes around the back and the buckle is fastened and centered on the wearers head.
2: The sides of the crown shall not be pushed in or otherwise modified. The brim will be flat with a slight droop at the front.
3: The Stetson will be worn on the head with the brim parallel to the ground.

4: Occasions for wearing the Stetson: Squadron dining-ins/outs, formal events in dress blues, gatherings of spur holders, professional gatherings such as AAAA and any other event or function as designated by Saber 6.

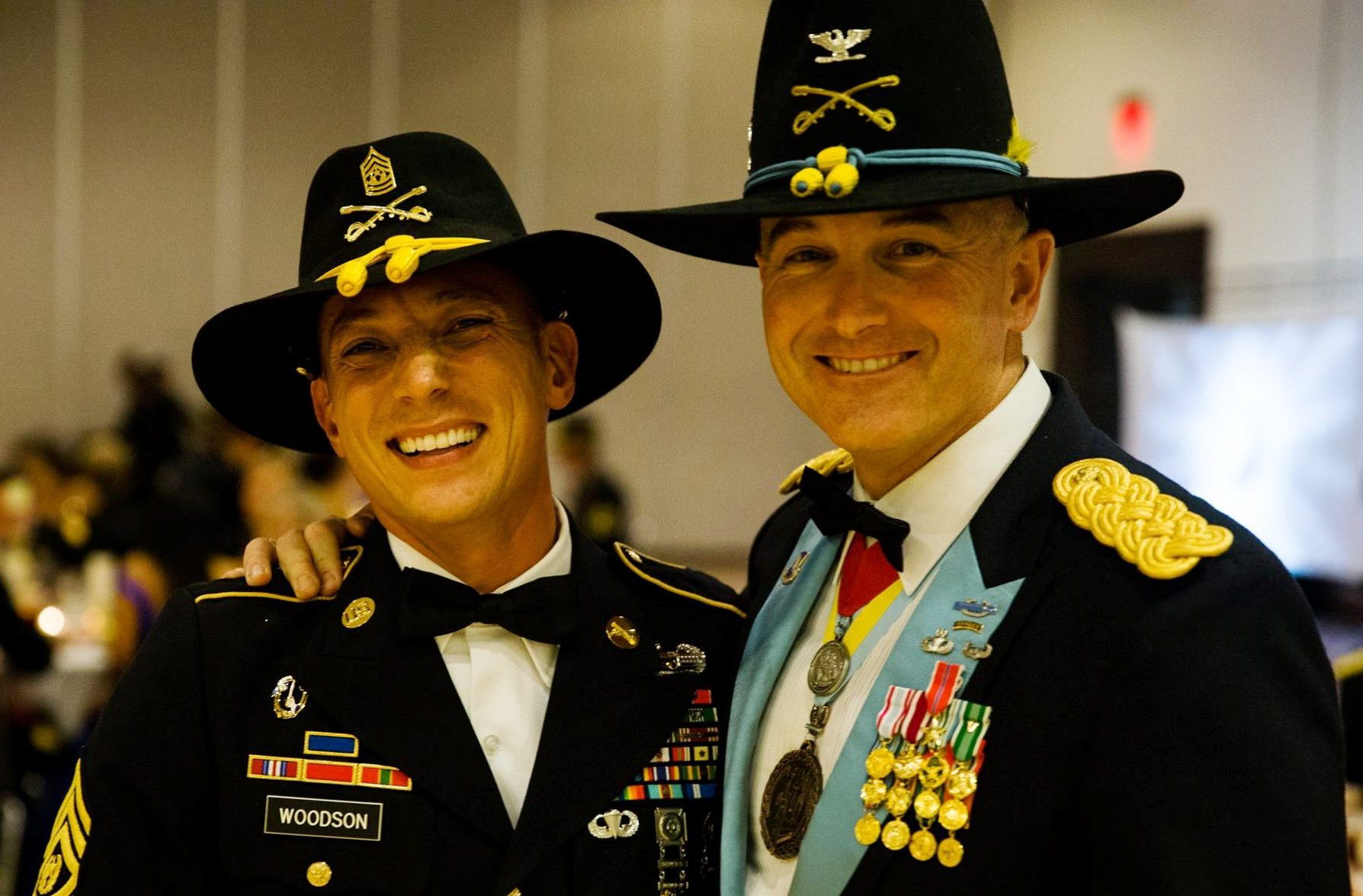
A U.S. Army NCO and officer wearing Cavalry Stetsons at a Dining in ceremony, both affixing cavalry branch and rank insignias on their Stetsons with the NCO wearing a yellow cord and the officer a light blue (infantry) cord with yellow tips

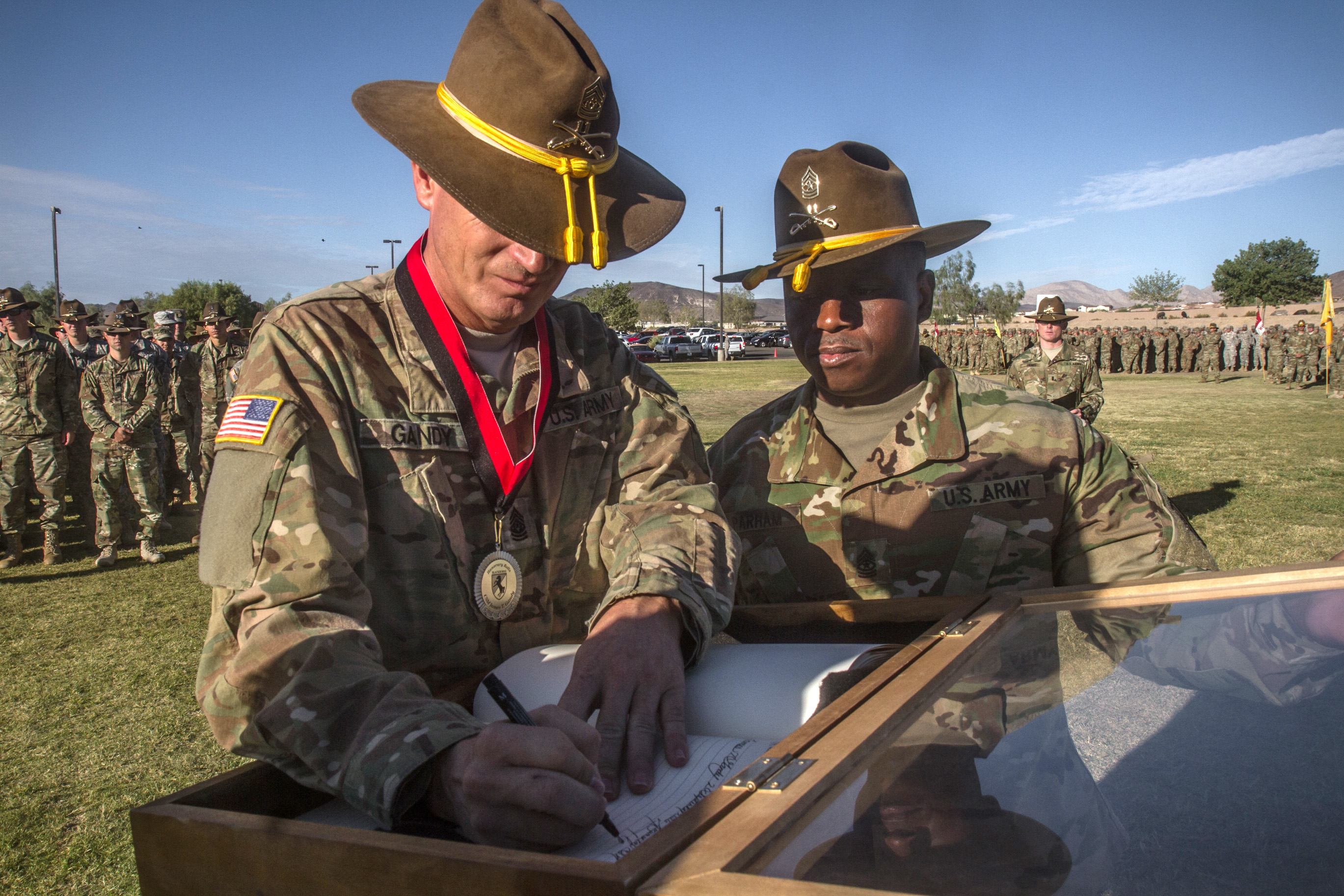
CSM James Gandy and SGM Reginald Parham wear their brown campaign covers at the 11th Armored Cavalry Regiment's Change of Responsibility ceremony (2016)

The 11th Armored Cavalry Regiment is an exception to this, in that they wear the brown Boss of the Plains campaign cover, but styled like a Stetson hat. This tradition is to honor their original uniforms from 1901 when the unit was formed.

Colored cords worn on the Stetson have evolved and expanded since their introduction in 1851. Below is a list of known cord colors and what they signified from 1851 through 1943:

Branch	Primary Color	Secondary Color	Established
Adjutant General	Dark Blue	Scarlet	1936
Air Corps	Ultramarine	Golden Orange	1920
Armored	Green	White	1942
Cavalry	Yellow		1855
Chaplains	Black		
Chemical Warfare	Cobalt Blue	Golden Yellow	1918
Coast Artillery	Scarlet		1902
Detached Enlisted Men	Green		
Field Artillery	Scarlet		1851
Finance	Silver Gray	Golden Yellow	1921
Infantry	Light Blue		1851
Inspector General	Dark Blue	Light Blue	1936
Judge Advocate General	Dark Blue	White	1936
Medical Department	Maroon	White	1916
Military Intelligence	Golden Yellow	Purple	1936
Military Police	Yellow	Green	1922
National Guard Bureau	Dark Blue		1921
Ordnance	Crimson	Yellow	1921
Permanent Professor (USMA)	Scarlet	Silver Gray	1936
Quartermaster	Buff		1902
Signal	Orange	White	1902
Specialists' Reserve	Brown	Golden Yellow	1936
Tank Destroyer	Golden Orange	Black	1943
Transportation	Brick Red	Golden Yellow	1942
Warrant Officers	Brown		1936
Women's Army Corps	Old Gold	Moss Green	1942

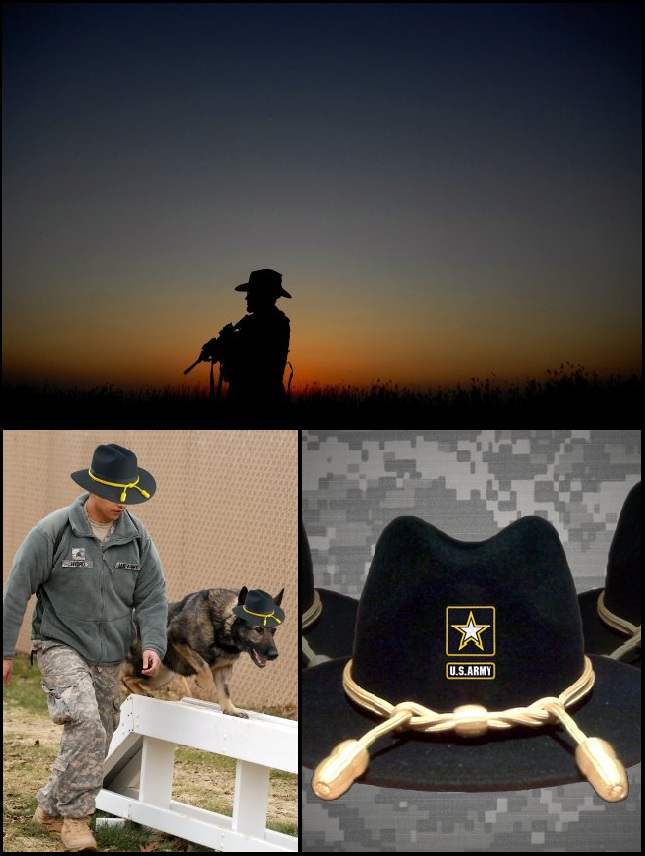
Three of the five photographs accompanying the announcement on army.mil

On April Fools' Day, 2011, the U.S. Army released a humorous statement that the official black beret of the Army would be replaced by stetsons. Below is an excerpt from the full announcement:

WASHINGTON, APRIL 1, 2011 -- In a fingertip-to-the-brim nod to its American frontier history, the Army is changing hats again - returning to the tumultuous days of the horse Cavalry in the wild west and adopting a dark blue Stetson as the official headgear for the current force of 1.1 million Soldiers. "We figure the Stetson will be popular with the troops," said Sgt. Maj. Bob S. Stone, Army Uniform Board headgear task force president. "It's been a while since we have changed the headgear, so it's time. Plus a Stetson is functional and down right American." But reminiscent of the controversial switch from the garrison cap to the black beret, the Army faces opposition from one community deeply opposed to losing its special identity with the Stetson - the Armor branch. "Why in the heck are they doing to us what they did to the snake-eaters'" asked one officer familiar with the board's deliberations. "If you ain't Cav, you ain't ought to be wearing a Cav hat. That just ain't right." [...] The Army's official adoption date of the Stetson will be April Fool's Day, 2012.

The statement was supplemented by pictures of soldiers with Cavalry Hats photoshopped over their berets, including a military working dog toting a stetson.

== See also ==
- List of hat styles
- Cavalry
- Combat Cavalry Badge
- Fiddler's Green
- Order of the Spur
- Stetson
- Headgear of the United States Army
