= List of headgear of the United States Army =

From 1776 to present day

The United States Army in its many forms: the Continental Army, Union Army, American Volunteers, and the regular army have worn many hats, helmets and caps for both combat and ceremonial use since its founding until today.

== Continental Army ==
- 1776-1781: The Black Tricorne - While some units wore other styles of caps, the Continental Army itself wore black tricorne hats with a black or silver ribbon and a black cockade. The hats were made of felt or leather.
- 1778-1781: The Officer Bicorne - Beginning in 1778, when French units began supplying the Continental Army with uniforms and equipment, many officers unofficially began wearing the French bicorne hat or "chapeau de bras."
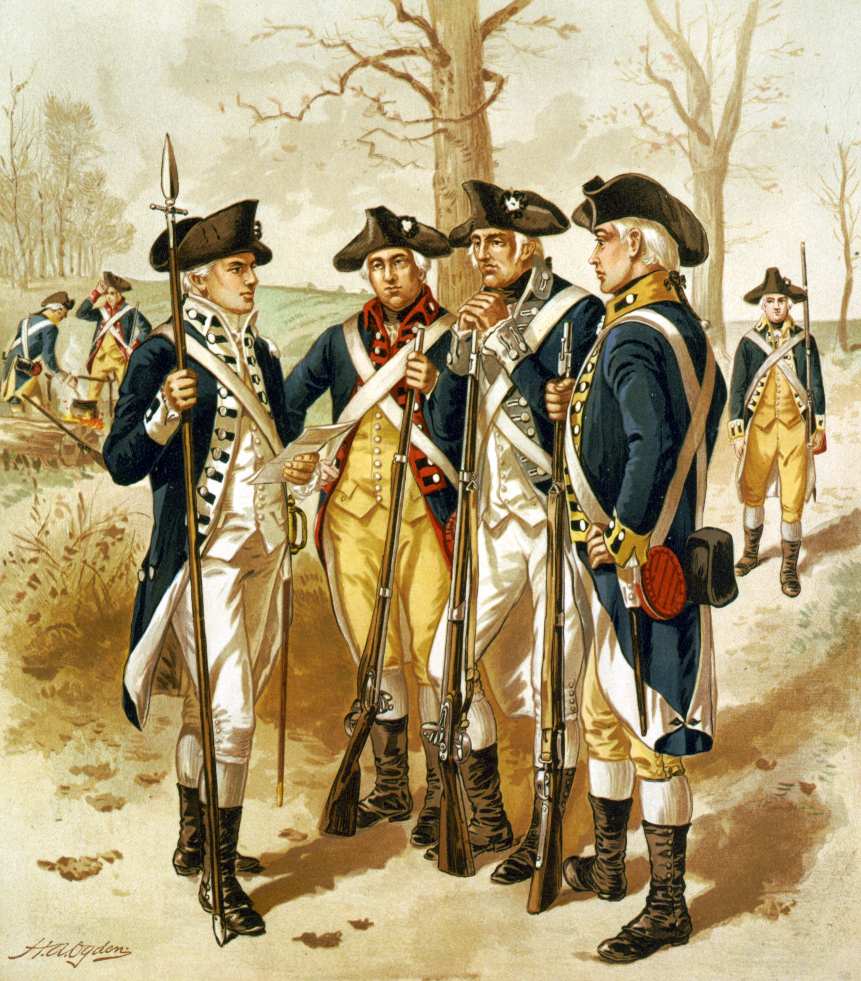
The Black Tricorne

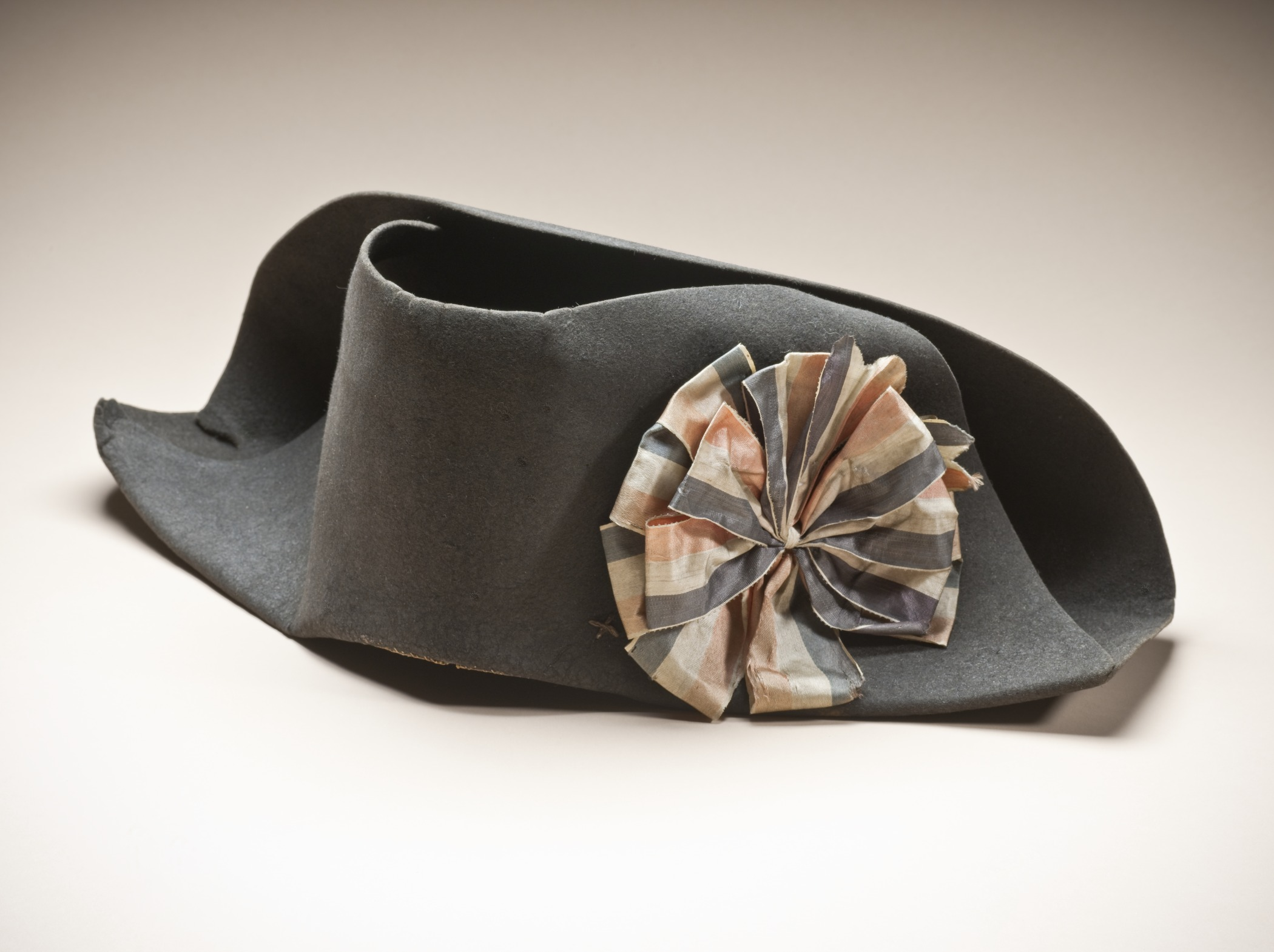
Officers Bicorne

== Legion of the United States ==
- 1790 Officer's Folding Bicorne (Chapeau de Bras) - These were folded flat bicorne hats usually of felt or beaver, it was usually reserved for high-ranking officers.
- 1794 Round Hat - top hat with a bear skin crest, usually worn with a round ribbon.
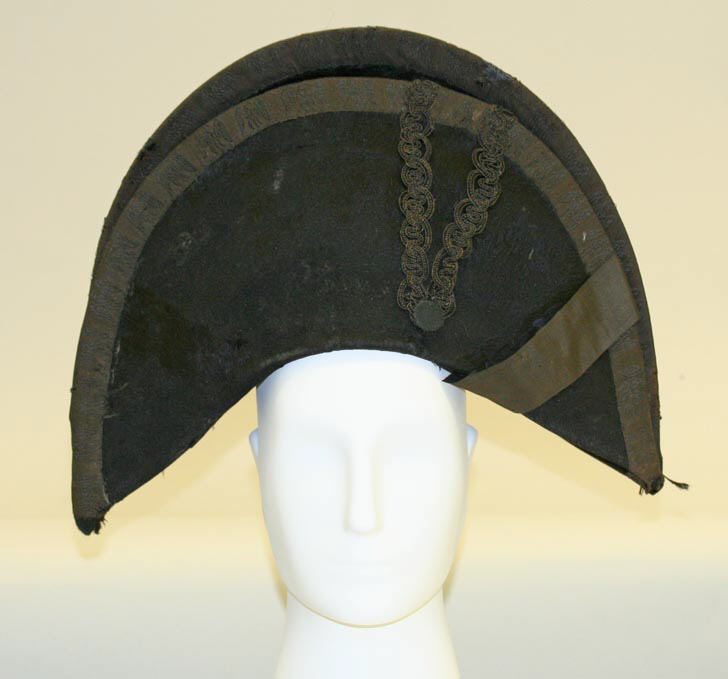
Bicorne Hat (Chapeau de Bras)

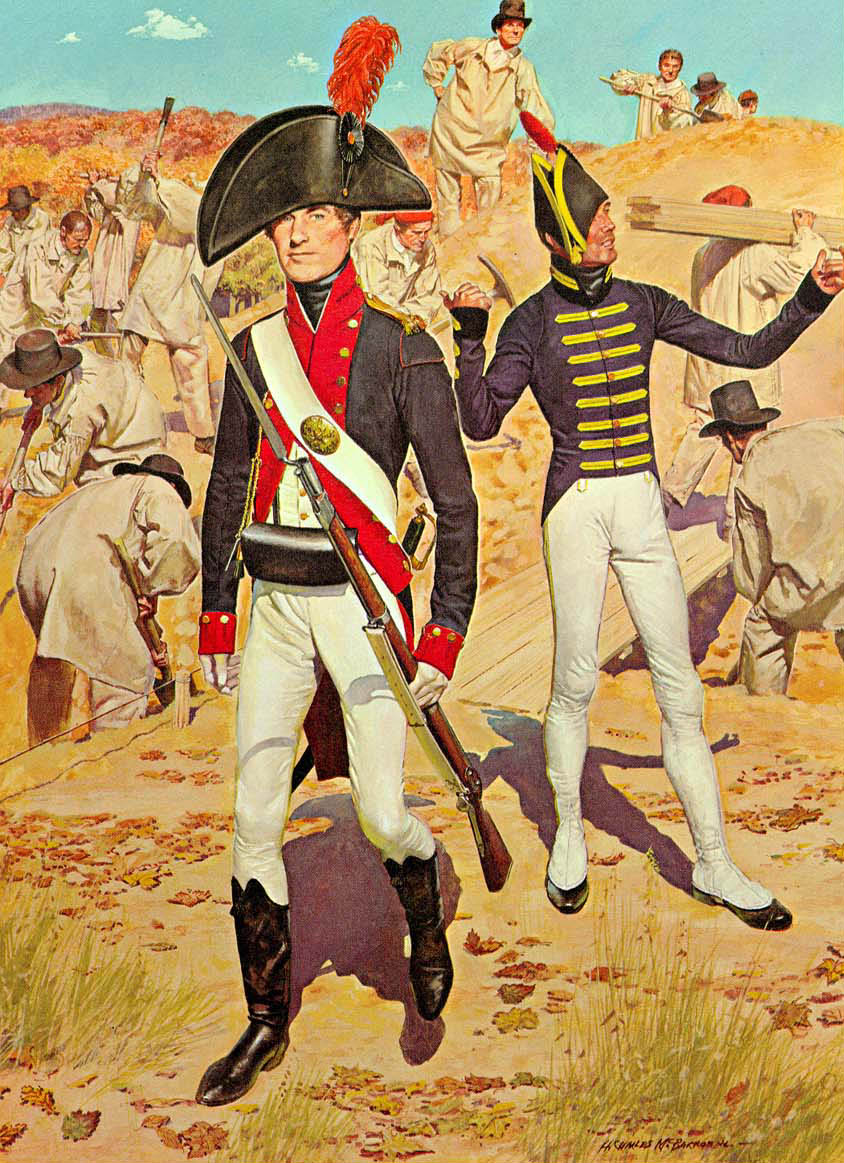

== Antebellum Era Army of the United States ==
- 1810 Pattern Shako - The 1810 Pattern Shako was a black felt round shako with a white plume on the front and a tasseled white cord hanging from the upper right hand side to the lower left hand side over the cap plate which was of silver metal.
- 1813 Pattern "Tombstone" Shako - The 1813 Pattern Shako was a leather round shako, similar to the 1810 pattern, but with a distinctive tall front panel that gave the nickname "tombstone."
- 1814 Light Dragoon Helmet - A black-lacquered leather helmet with a high, frequently metal or stiff leather comb and a front visor were used by the 1st and 2nd Regiment of Light Dragoons in the regular army as well as militia units like the Light Dragoons, 5th Cavalry District, Baltimore City.
- 1821 Bell Crown Shako "Tar Bucket" - The 1821 Pattern Bell Crown Shako was also made of leather with a center pom and tassel on the right with a metal chin strap and a silver eagle on the front.
- 1825 Chako "Pinwheel" Cap - The 1825 Chako "Pinwheel" Cap is so called because of its round shape with sections sewn in a pie shape. This blue cap had a brim and was the first to be called a "forage cap."
- M1832 "Stovepipe" Shako - Similar to the 1810 pattern shako, it was made of felt with a leather brim. It had a gold eagle and a brass insignia for branch.
- M1833 Forage Cap - Unique tarred leather, collapsable forage cap.
- Pattern 1839 Forage Cap - A cloth cap, similar to the leather 1833 cap.
- 1851 Pattern "Albert Cap" Shako - The 1851 pattern shako was wool felt and had a lean that was similar to the Civil War era Kepi hat.

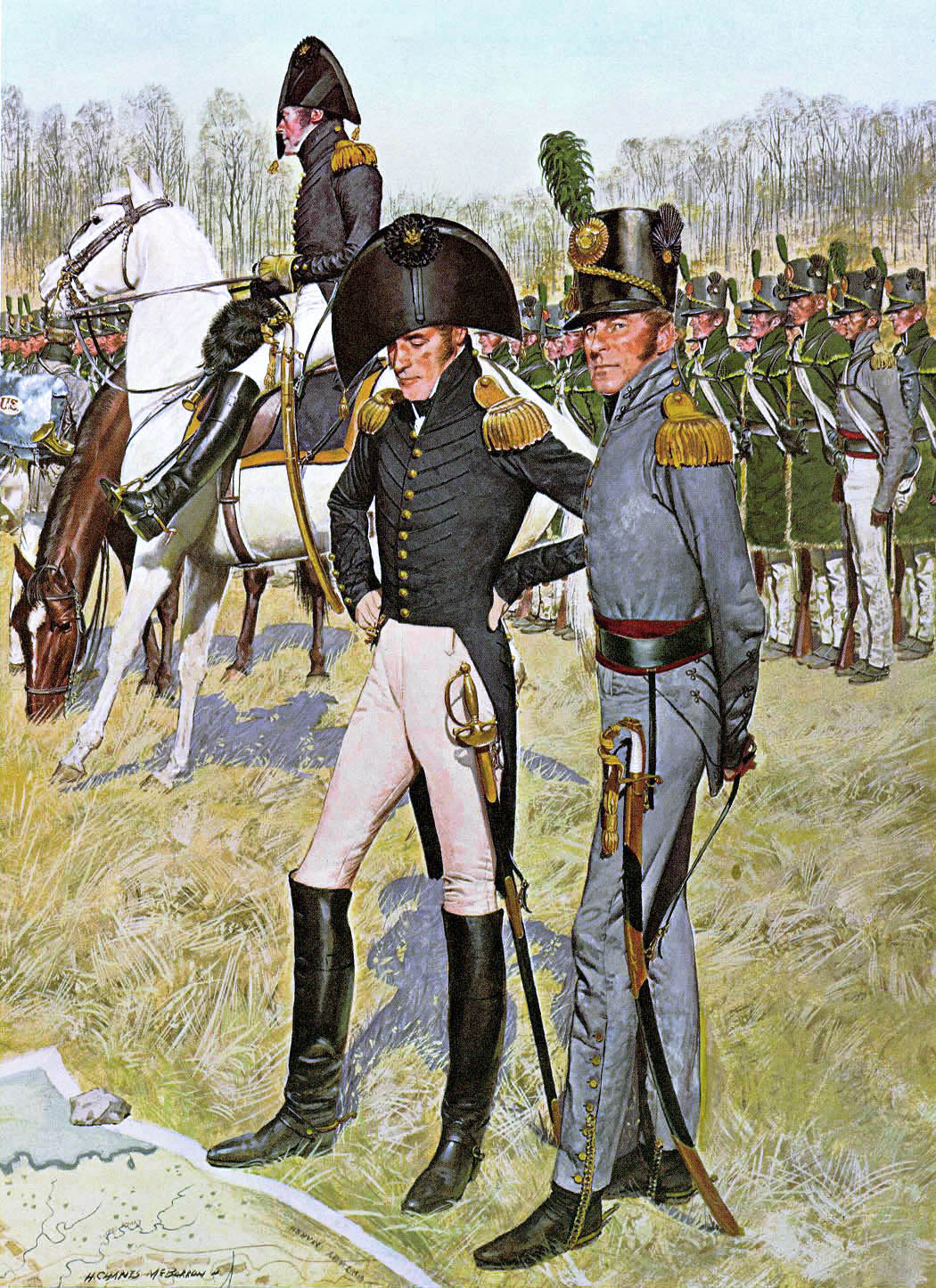
"Tombstone" Shako

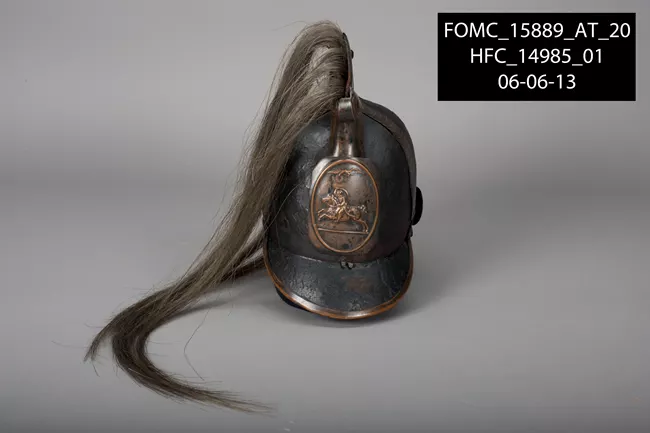
Light Dragoon Helmet

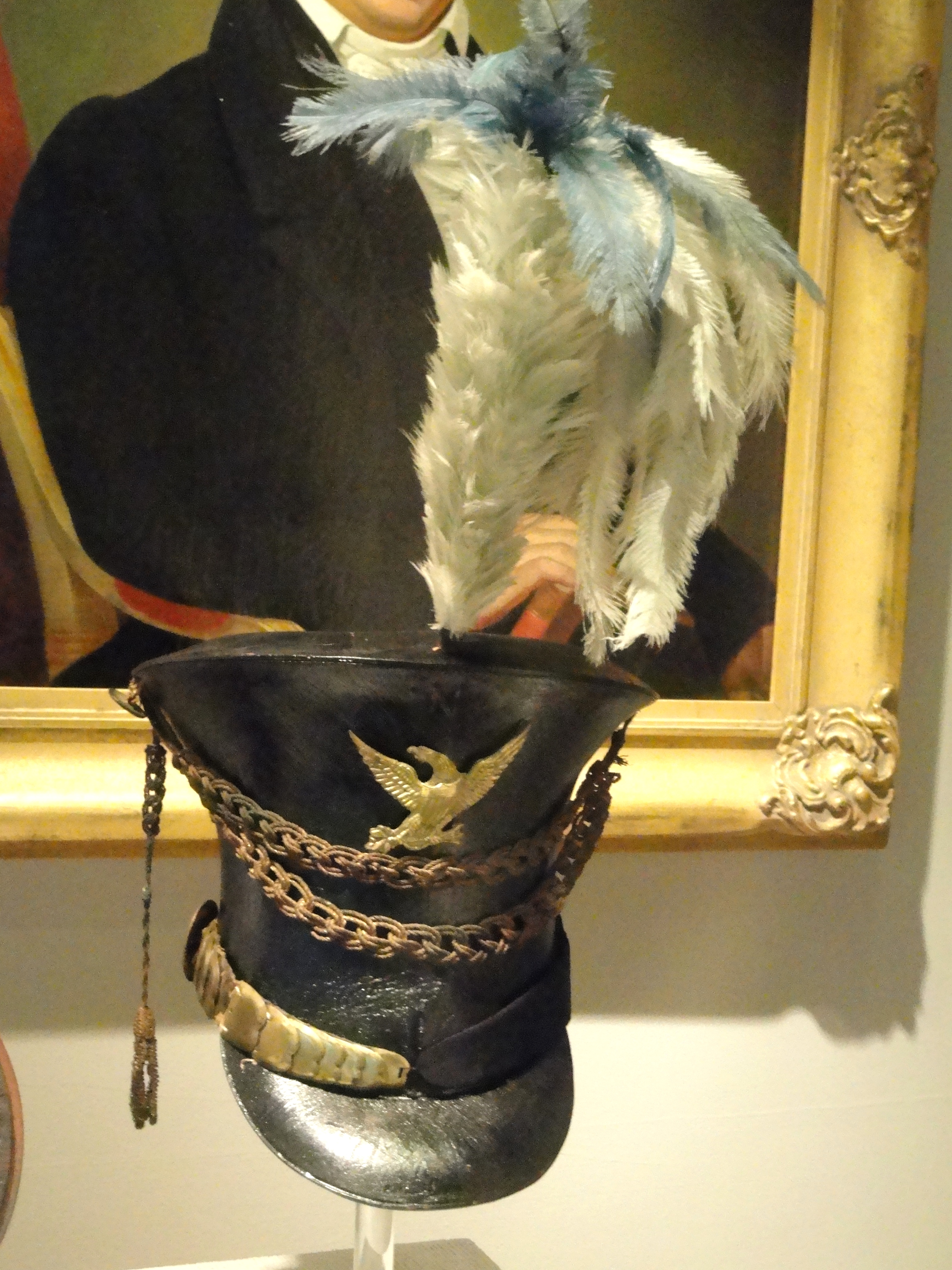
Tar Bucket Shako

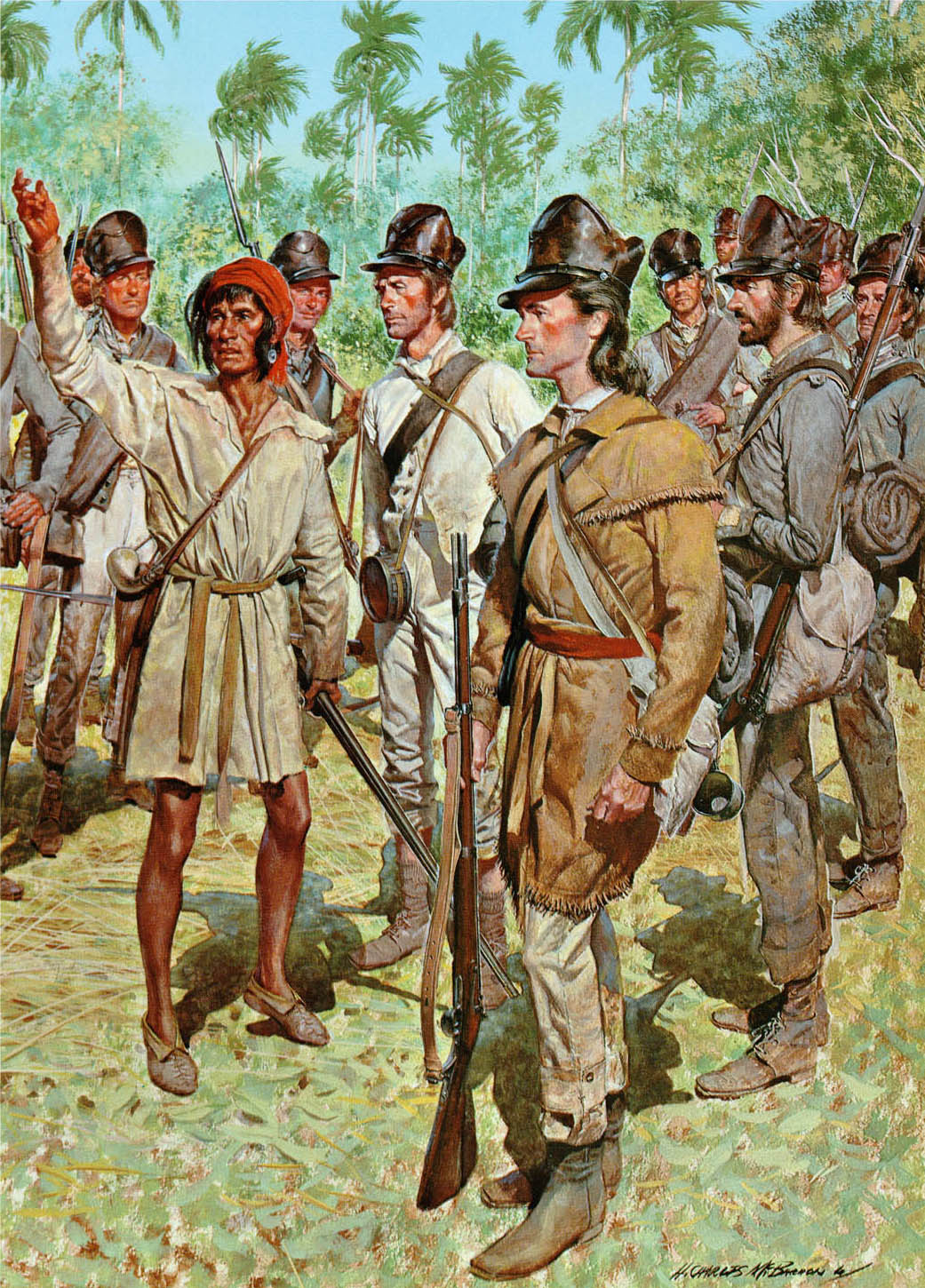
1833 Folding Forage Cap

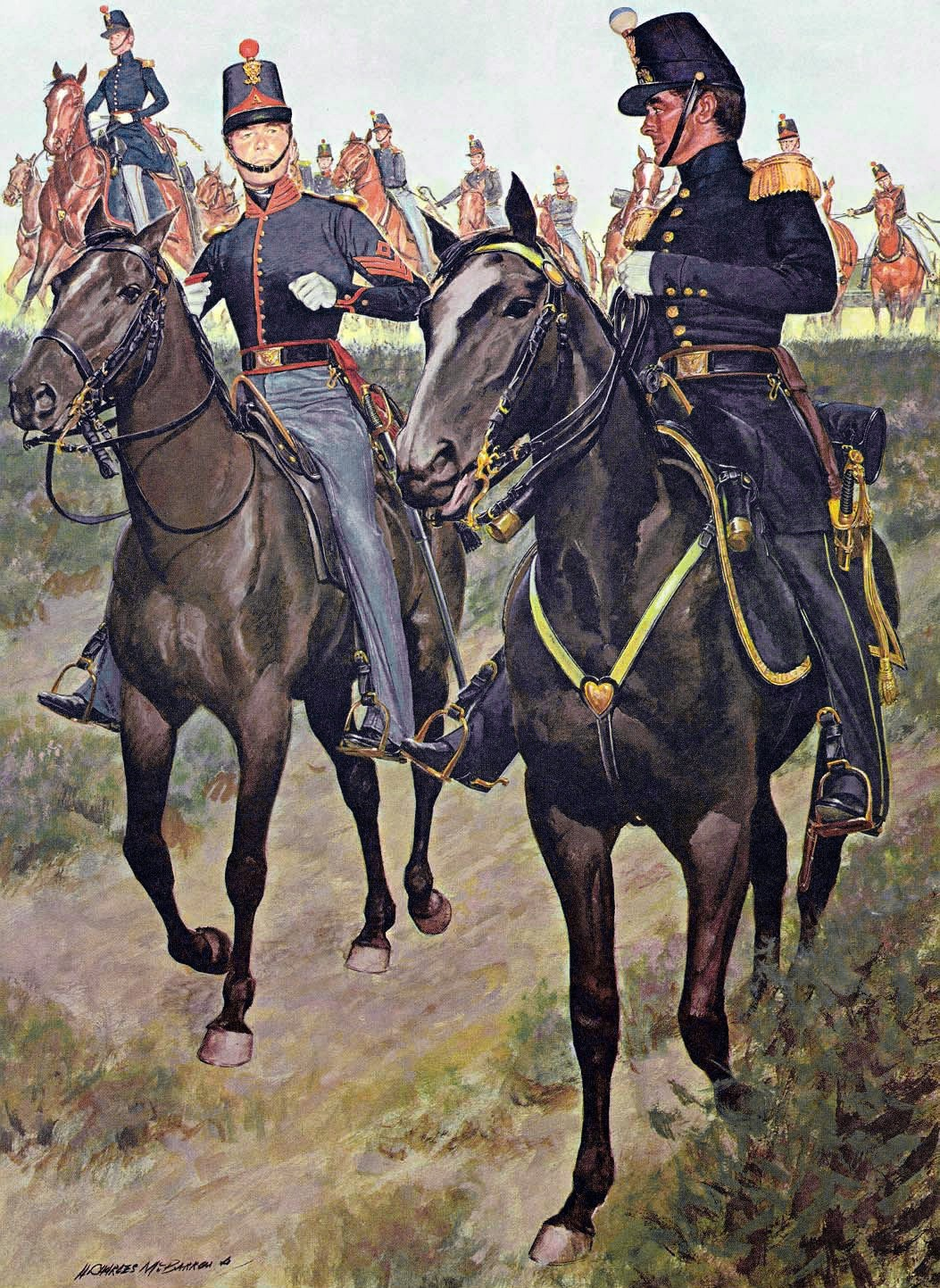
"Albert Cap" Shako

== Union Army ==
- 1858 Hardee Hat - Originally for cavalry, it was a felt hat that was popular in the west before the Civil War. During the war, it went out of favor for being hot and heavy. But the Iron Brigade of the Union Army wore them and were nicknamed the "Black Hats."
- Pattern 1858 Slouch Hat - It was made from Beaver felt with a velvet hatband. Both Union and Confederate troops wore these hats during the war.
- 1858 Forage Cap - The army began issuing the "kepi"-style forage cap in 1858 and the troops called it the "shapeless feedbag." It was worn throughout the Civil War by both Union and Confederate troops. Union troops generally wore their branch device and regiment number on brass pins as well as Corps device later in the war. The caps were worn after the war, usually by officers.
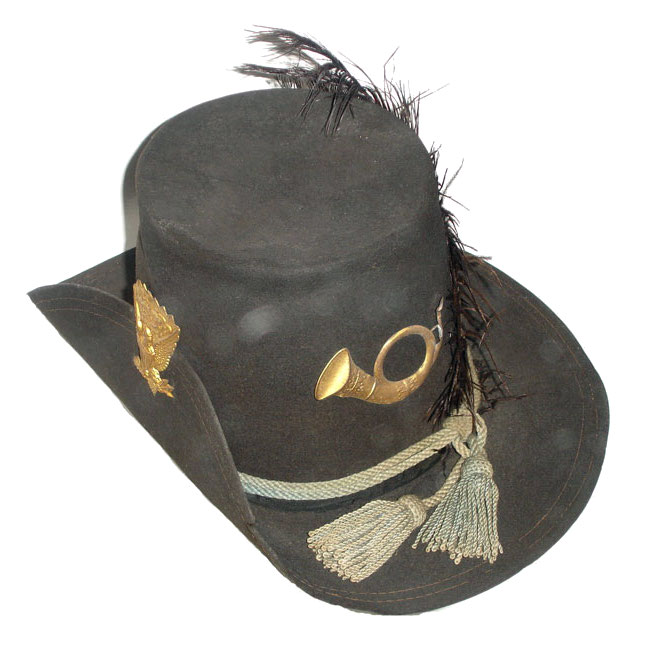
  Hardee Hat
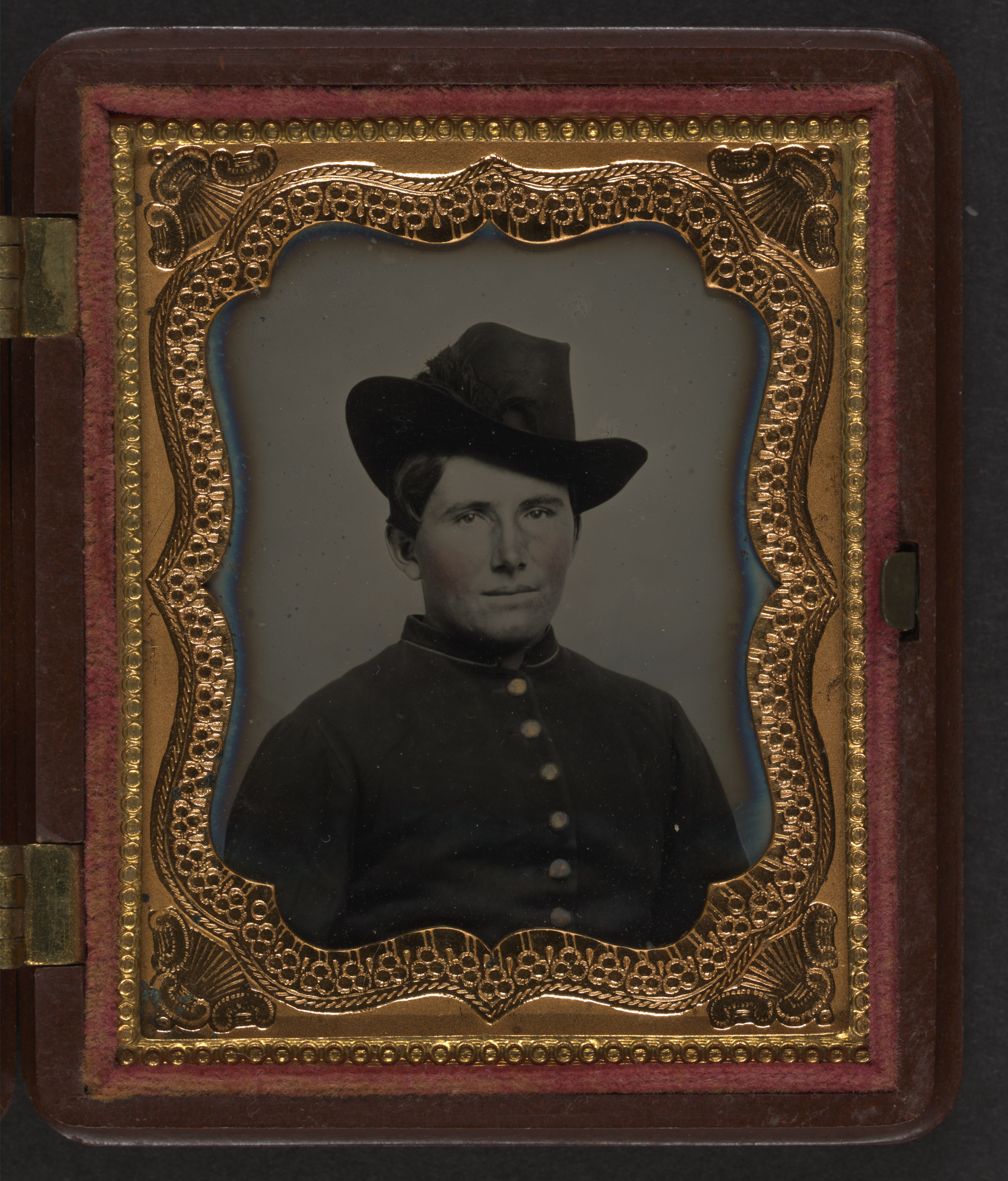
  Slouch Hat
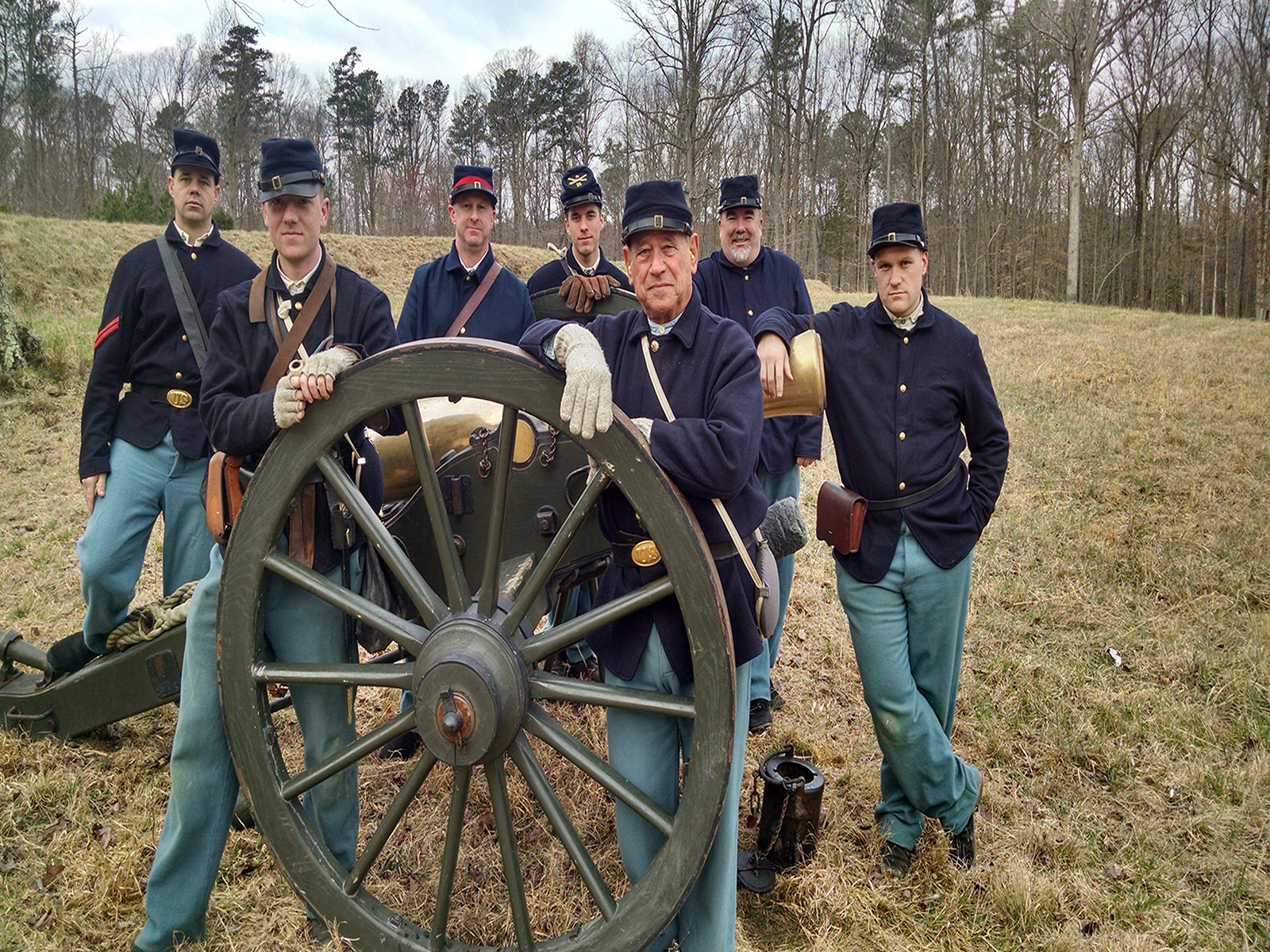
  Kepi style Forage Cap

== Plains Wars / Spanish-American War Era Army of the United States ==
- 1864 Pattern Shako - A slightly taller and more elaborate dress version of the Union Army Kepi hat.
- 1865 Cavalry Stetson - The Cavalry Stetson began being worn by troops in the western states after the Civil War. It was a variation of the Stetson cowboy hat that also created the Campaign Hat. It is currently worn by several US Army Cavalry units.
- 1872 Campaign Cover - Originally the Stetson "Boss of the Plains" hat which changed from black to khaki (or drab) and by the 1890s had a "Montana Peak" style was semi-official and by 1911 was an official army hat. Drill Instructors in the Army as well as several other branches wear the Campaign Cover.
- M1872 Shako - Similar to the 1864 pattern Shako, but less elaborate was worn until 1882.
- Pattern 1872 Forage Cap - a shorter version of the classic Civil War kepi style cap.
- Pattern 1876 Campaign Hat - a black felt campaign hat, similar to civilian hats of the era, had a narrow brim with a stitched edge, a fore and aft crease, and a Bracher patented metal vent centered on each side.
- 1881 Dress Helmet - Based on the British Household Cavalry helmet it was reminiscent of the German Pickelhaube (pointed helm) of the same period.
- Pattern 1883 Campaign Hat - a khaki colored version of the 1876 hat.
- 1895 Visored Cap - This hat was a shorter and stiffer version of the 1858 forage cap and at the same time a forerunner of the service cap with its stiff rounded leather brim.
- 1889 Campaign Hat - simpler, smaller version of the 1883 hat worn during the Spanish-American War.
- Pattern 1895 Forage Cap - similar to navy caps of the era and a "squashed" version of a Dan Daly cap.
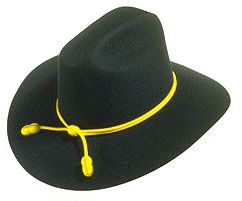
Cavalry Stetson

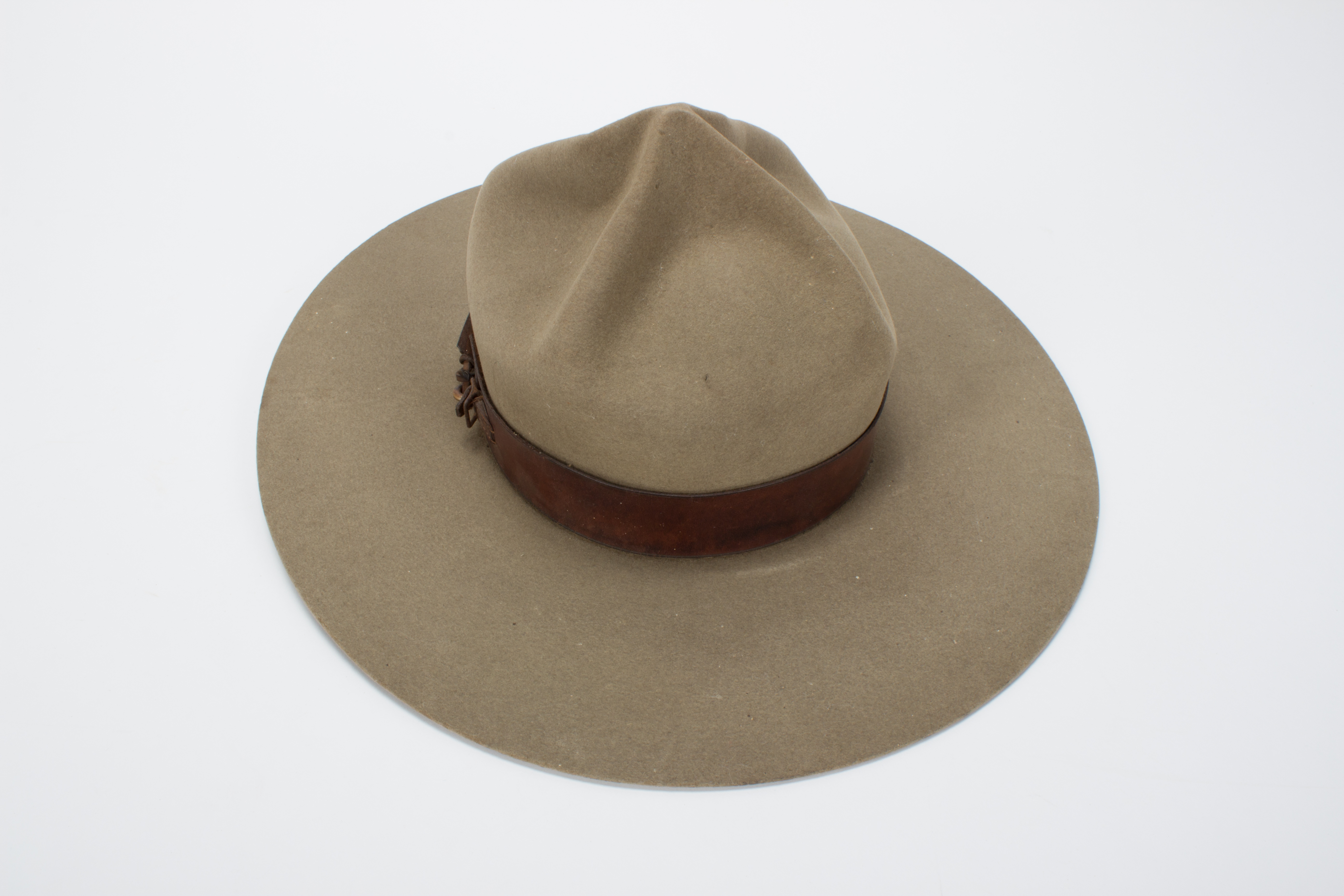
Campaign Cover

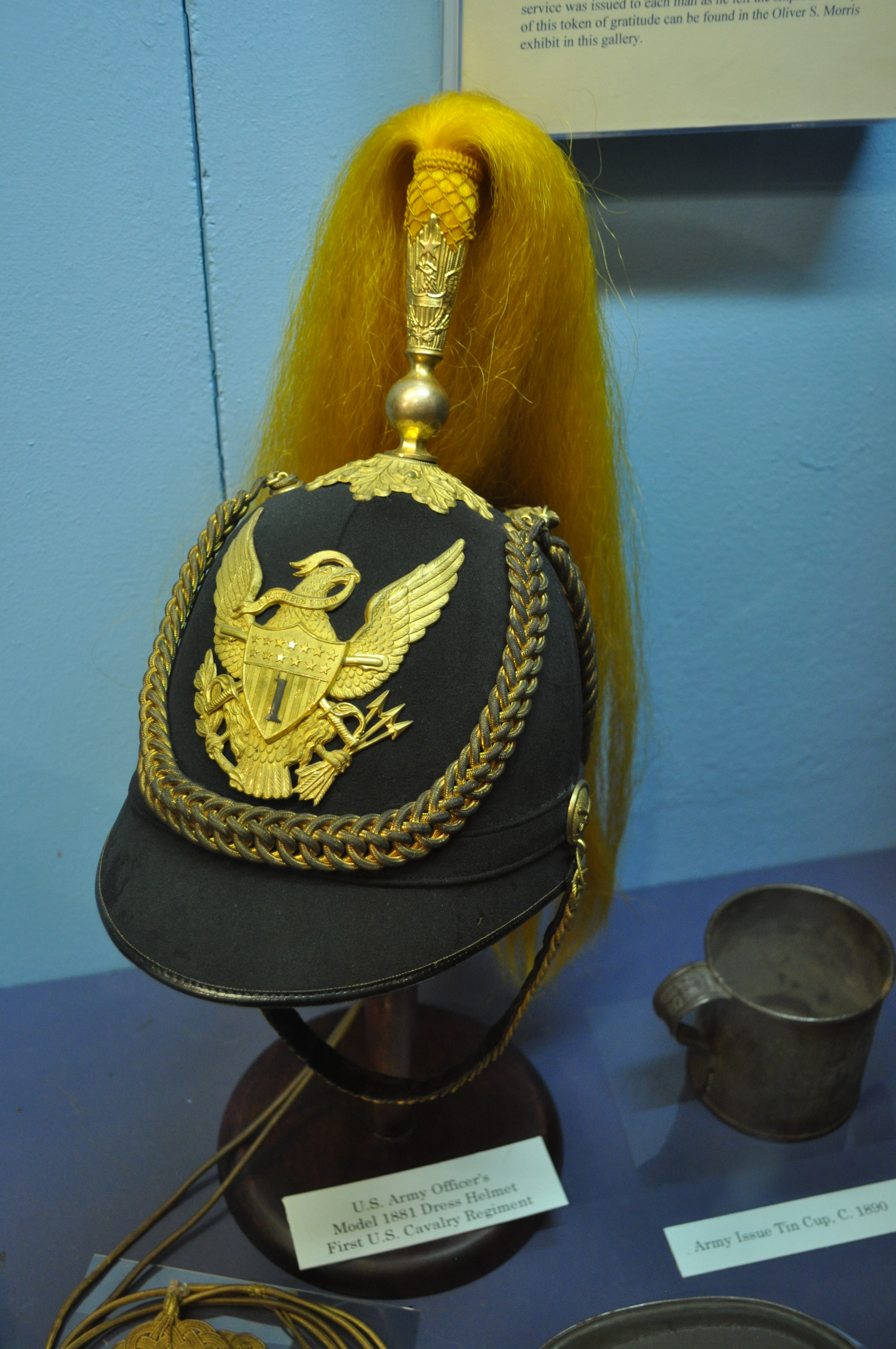
1881 Dress Helmet

== World War I Era United States Army ==
- 1902 Service Cap - Beginning with the early 20th Century, the US Army has worn some version of the Service or Combination Cap with nearly every dress uniform through the present day. Generally the color would match the service dress coat, but not always - as for a time the Army wore the Green Service Cap with Khakis and military police wore white caps with their green uniforms. In 1912 the army would update the design slightly.
- 1916 Overseas Cap - The Garrison Cap has had many names, starting with overseas cap in 1916 as it was issued to soldiers going "over there" to fight in France. The shape, cut and style has changed several times and after the Army Green uniform was no longer in use, so too the Garrison cap, but with the return of the Pinks and Greens - a new version of the cap was again authorized.
- M1917 Brodie Helmet - This Kettle style helmet was originally designed by the British Army and a large number were purchased by the US Army before making their own in the US.
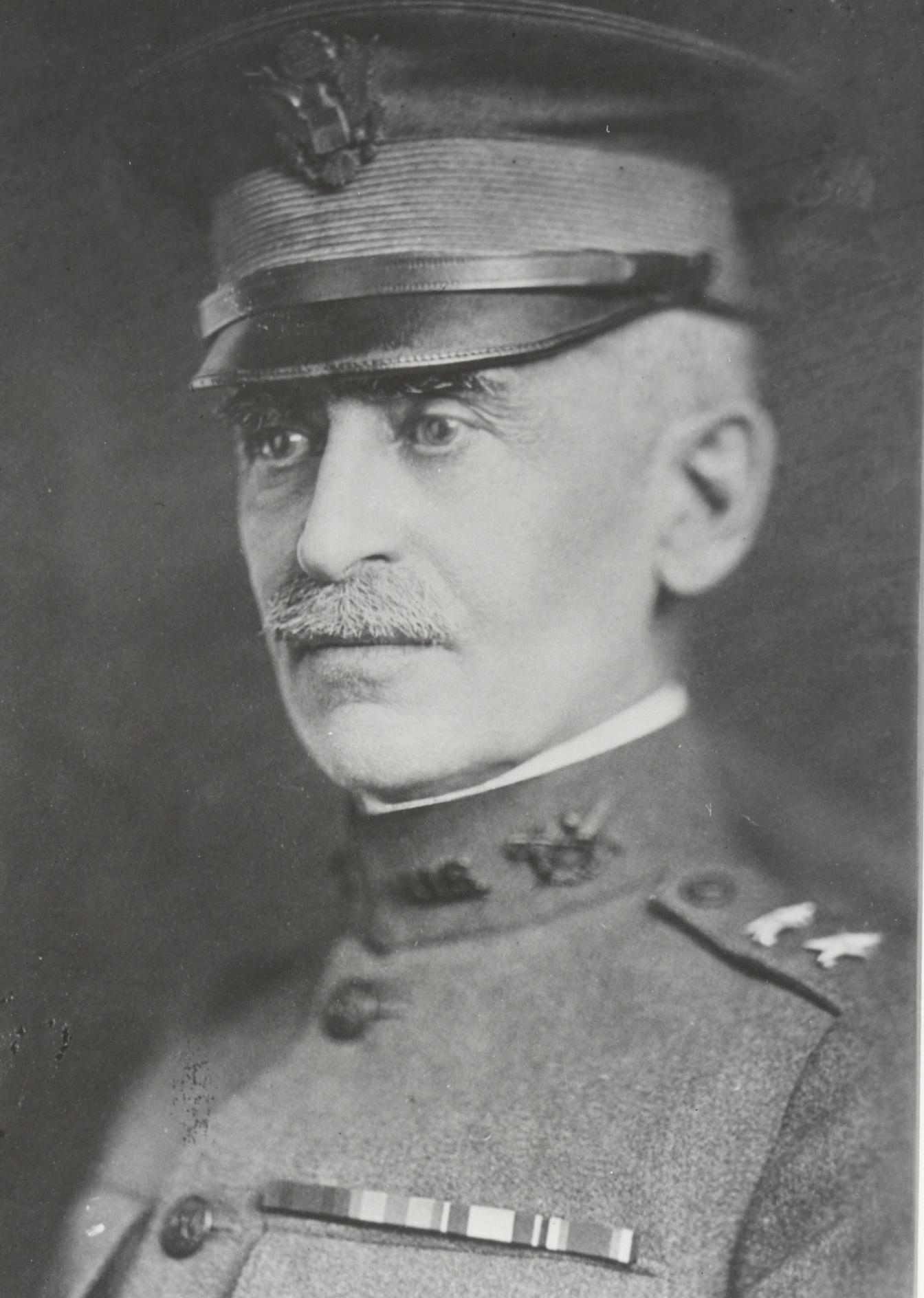
  Service Cap
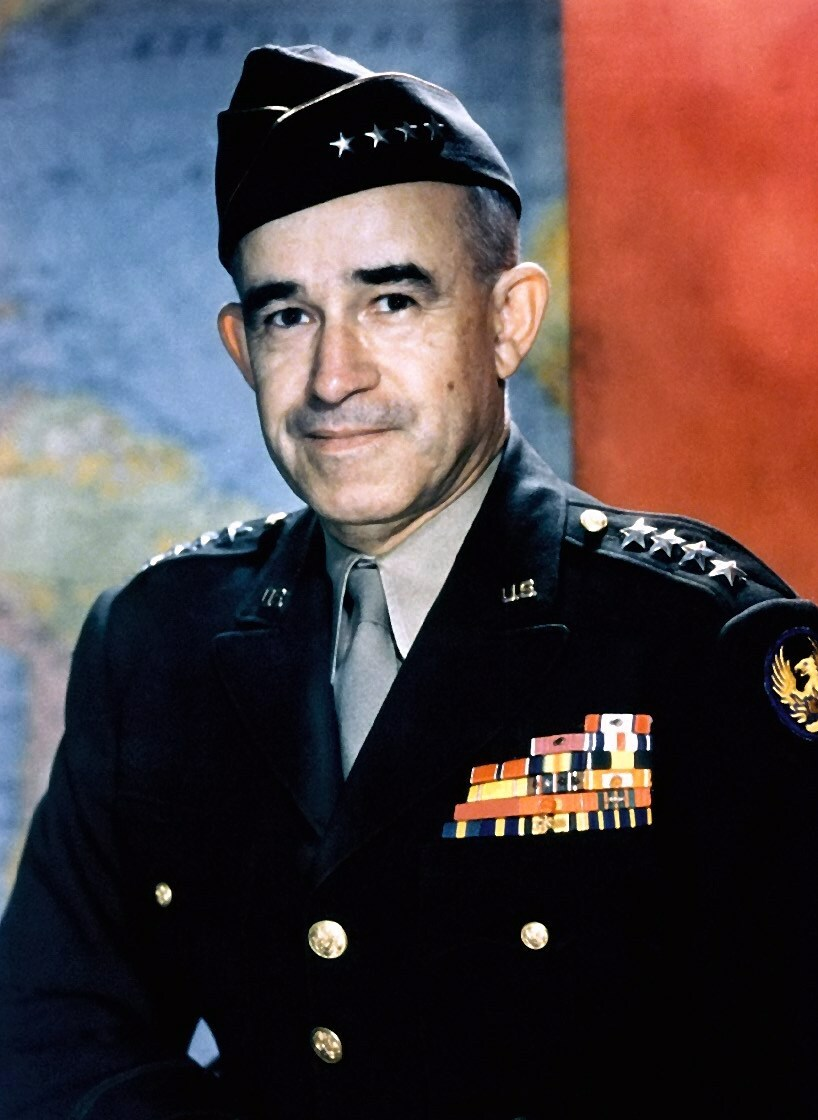
  Overseas Cap
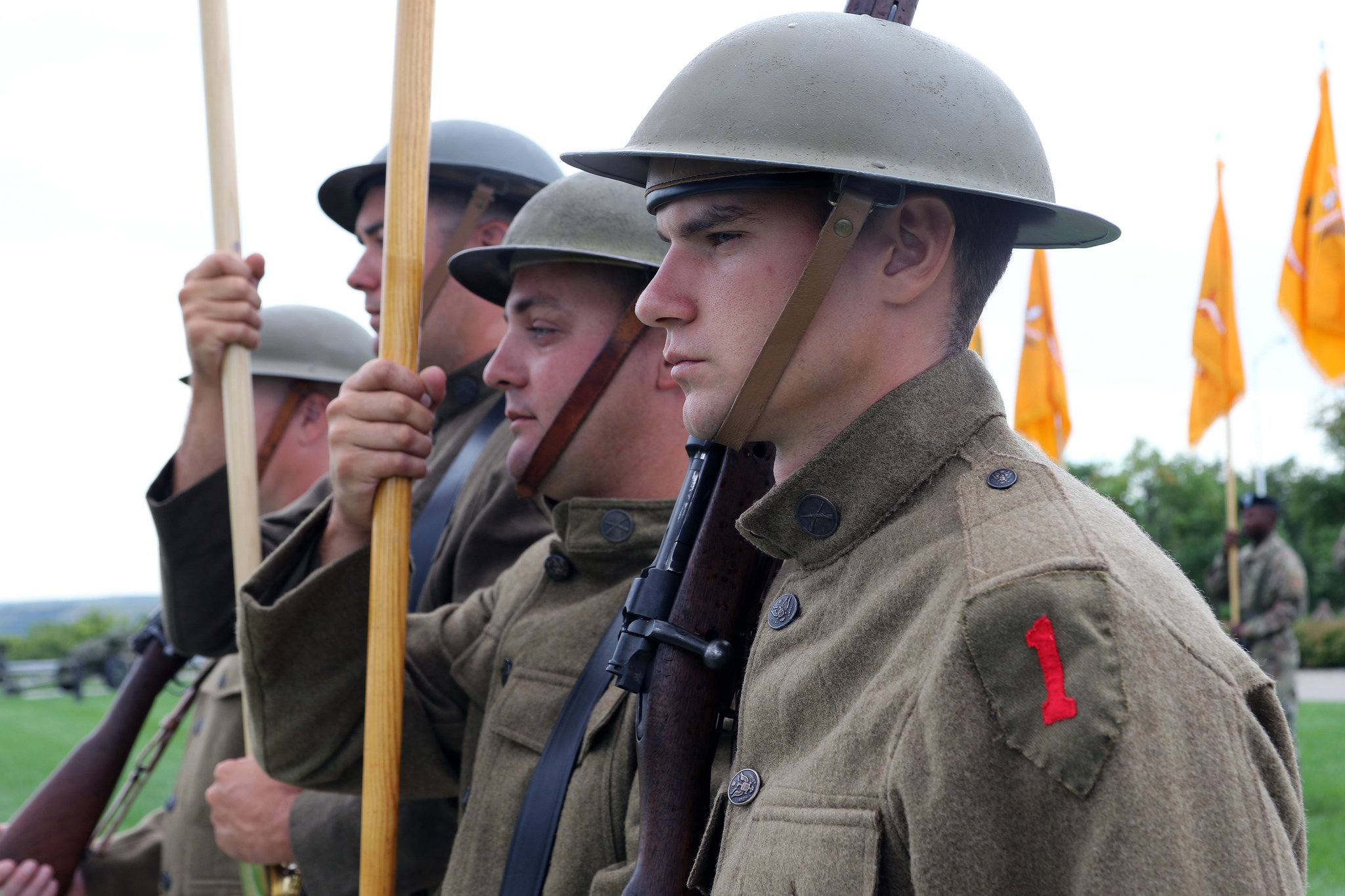
  Brodie Helmet

== World War II Era United States Army ==
- 1930 Sun Helmet - The 1930 Sun Helmet is also known as the American Fiber Helmet. It was first entered into US service in 1938 and used by both the army and the Marine Corps.
- 1940 M1 Helmet - The M1 Helmet was the main combat headgear for the US Army as well as other branches from World War II through to nearly the end of the Cold War. The helmet was made of a steel outer piece and a plastic and leather inner liner. It was customizable and could be covered with a fabric cover in different camouflage colors or netting.
- M1941 Jeep Cap - The Jeep cap was a knit cap used during cold weather in World War II and Korea.
- 1941 HBT Cap - A utility cap, similar to a patrol cap made from Herringbone Twill material.
- 1942 WAC Hobby Hat - The original "bucket cap" female service hat was designed by Oveta Culp Hobby for the Women's Army Corps in 1942. The basic design was modified, but continued for both female officer and enlisted soldiers until today, despite other types of caps (garrison, service) being authorized for female soldiers today.
- M1943 Winter Pile Cap - This cap was designed to be used with a helmet to keep the face and ears warm, but was also used in garrison duty areas by itself.
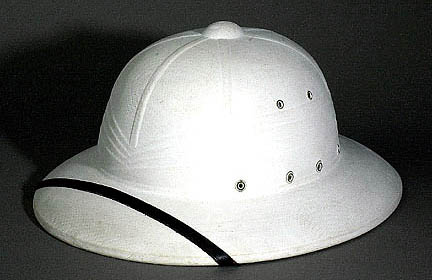
  Sun Helmet
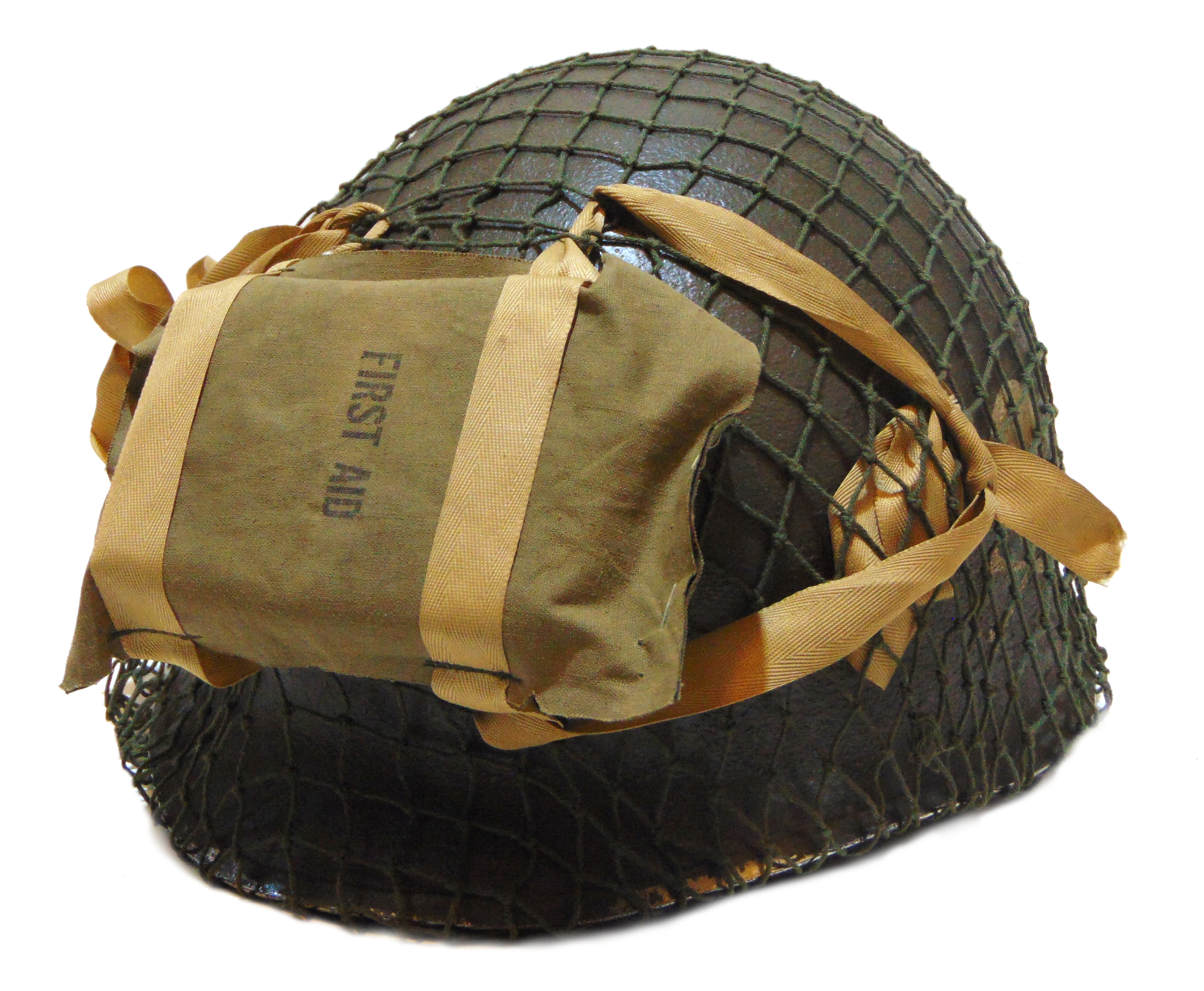
  M1 Helmet
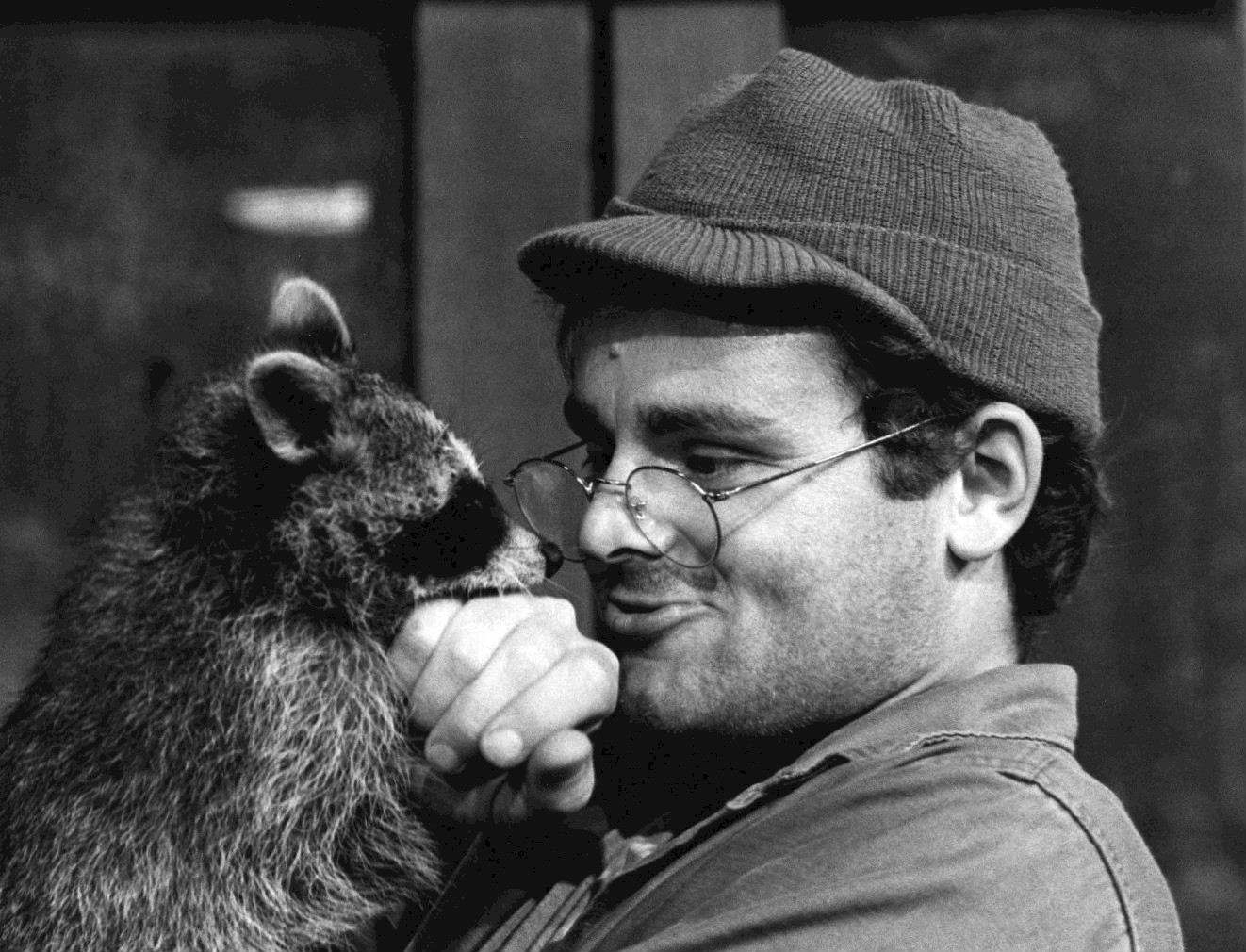
  Jeep Cap
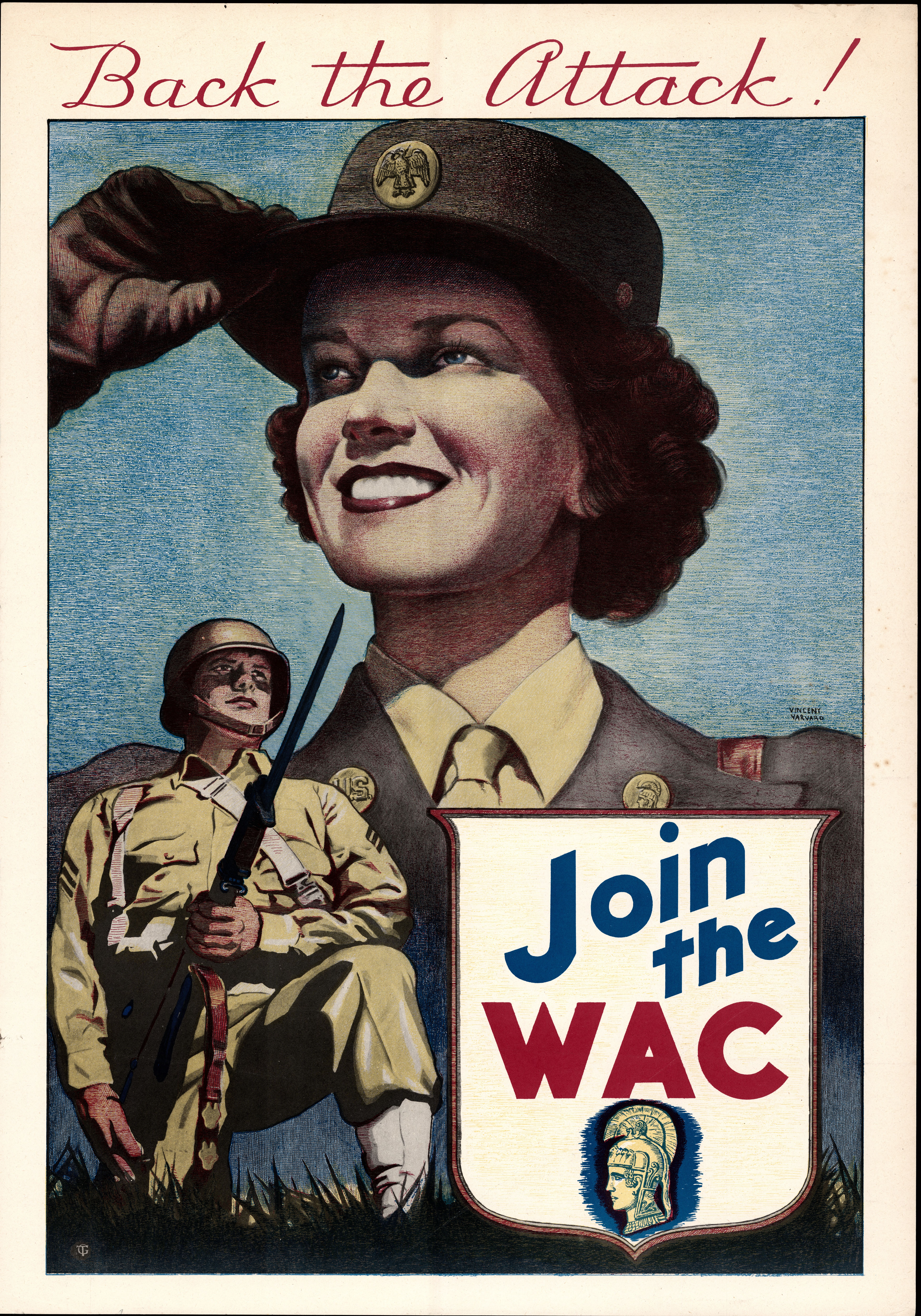
  Hobby Hat
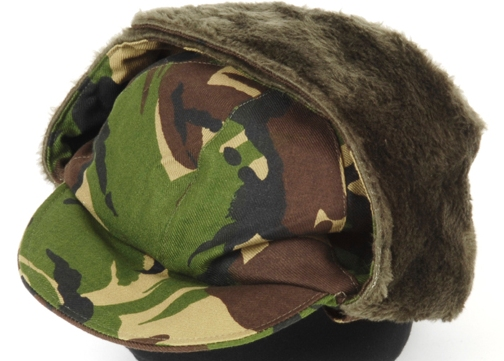
  Winter Pile Cap

== Cold War / Vietnam War Era United States Army ==
- 1951 Army Beret - When the Ranger companies returned from World War II, they took on some of the habits of their European allies and in 1951 began wearing black berets. In the 1960s the Special Forces would begin wearing green berets and in the 1970s commanders were allowed to experiment with different colors. And in 2001, the Army changed its main headgear to the black beret until bringing back the patrol cap in 2011.
- 1951 Patrol Cap - The Patrol cap or "field cap" became the standard headwear for the Army during the Korean War and has come in and out of favor during the BDU uniform era as well as the OCP and ACU eras. It is a round cap with a flat top and a baseball style brim. It has been OD green as well as nearly every kind of camouflage pattern. It is the current duty uniform cap. An ironed, stiffened version appeared for a number of years due to General Matthew Ridgway disliking the "sloppy" appearance of the patrol cap.
- 1962 OG-107 Hot Weather Field Cap - The hot weather field cap was a reaction to the hot conditions in Vietnam and so a baseball style cap was developed and would replace the Patrol Cap until 1985 when it returned with the BDU uniform.
- 1967 Boonie Hat - During the Vietnam war, the army tried a number of hats in an effort to find one that would provide comfort in a hot and humid environment. Versions of the hat have come and gone and it has appeared in nearly every style of camouflage the military has fielded. (a similar HBT cap had been fielded in 1941)
- 1972 Female Beret - A more round version of the beret was created specifically for female troops in 1972 as they became a part of the regular Army and no longer only in the Women's Army Corps.
- 1985 PASGT Helmet - The Personnel Armor System for Ground Troops (PASGT) helmets were a kevlar helmet that began to be used in 1985 and often called a "Fritz" helmet due to its neck covering similar to German helmets of the 1940s.
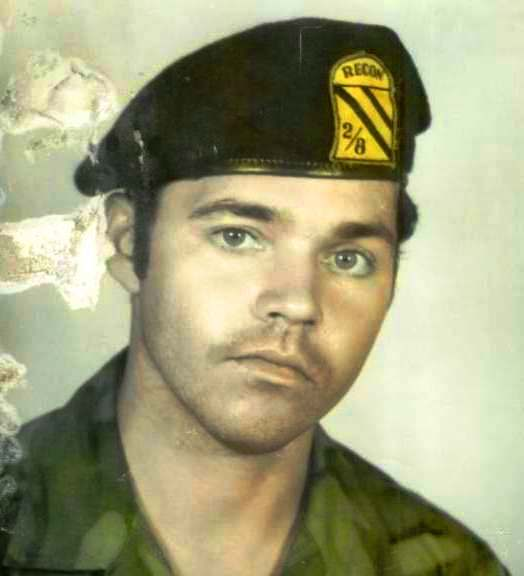
  Army black beret
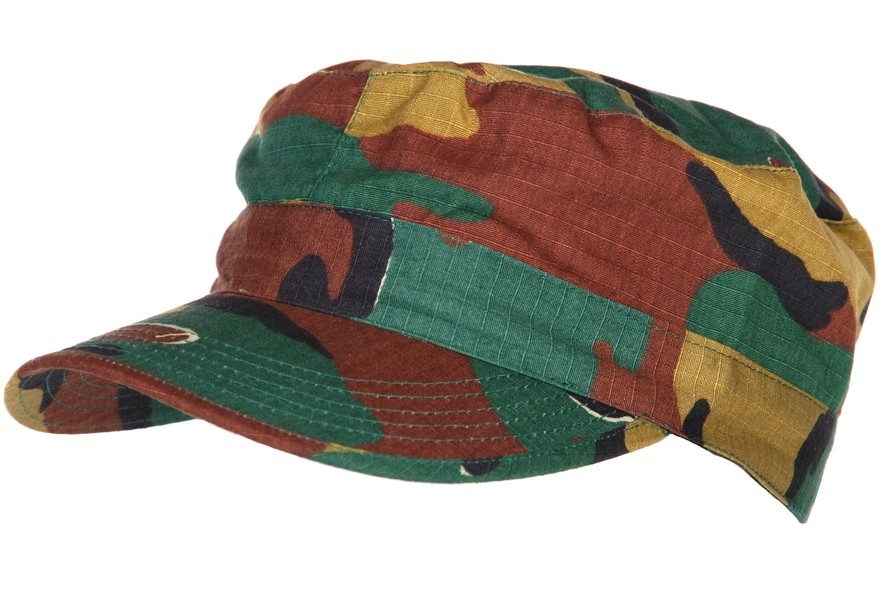
  Patrol Cap
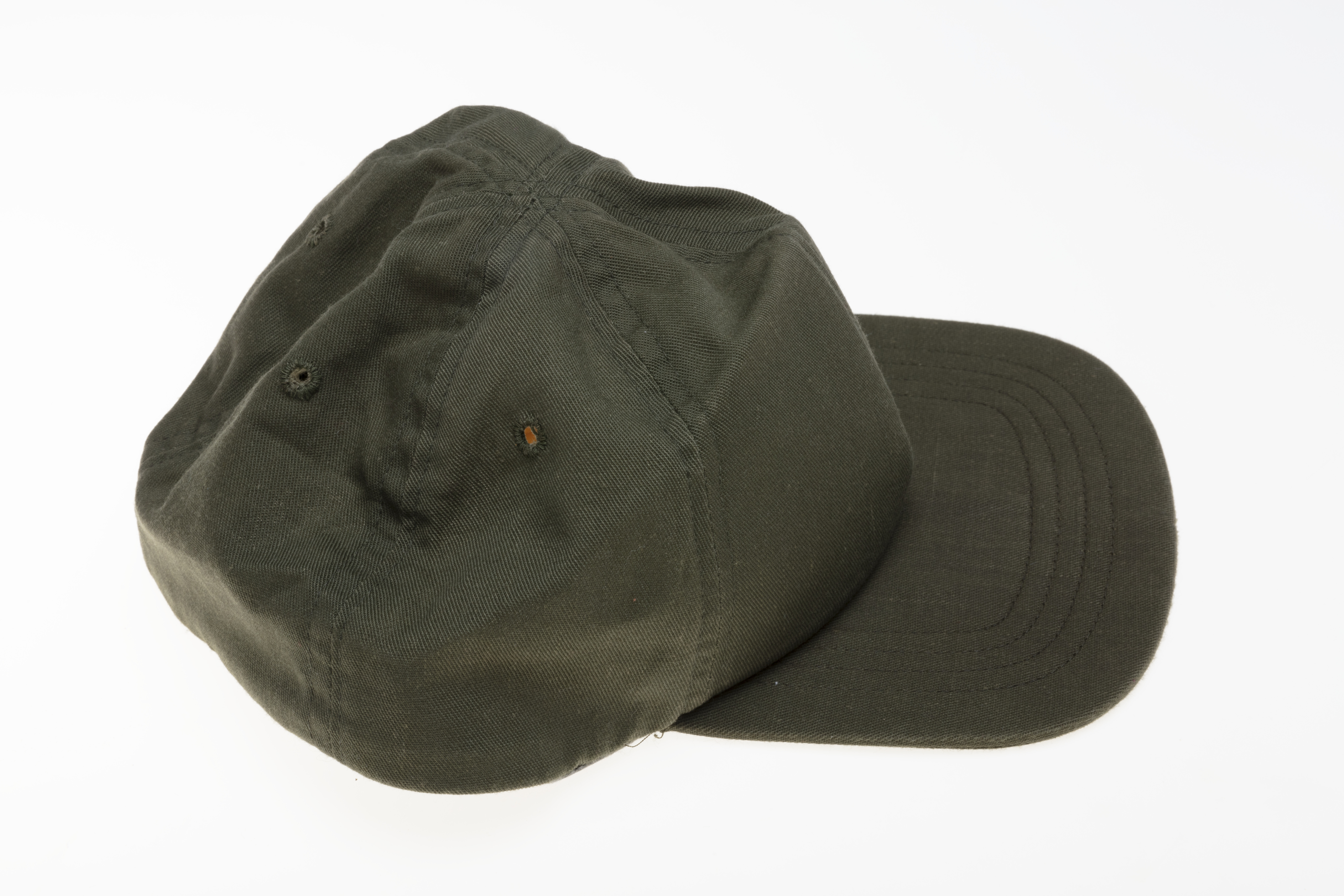
  Hot Weather Cap
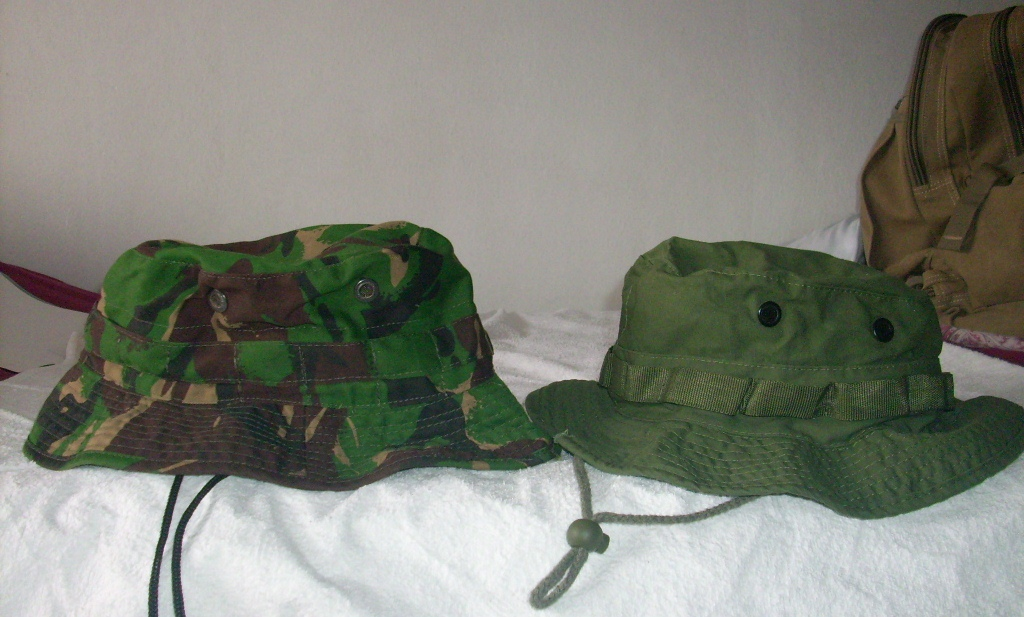
  Boonie Hat
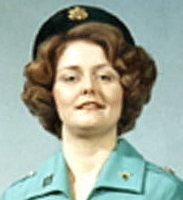
  Female beret
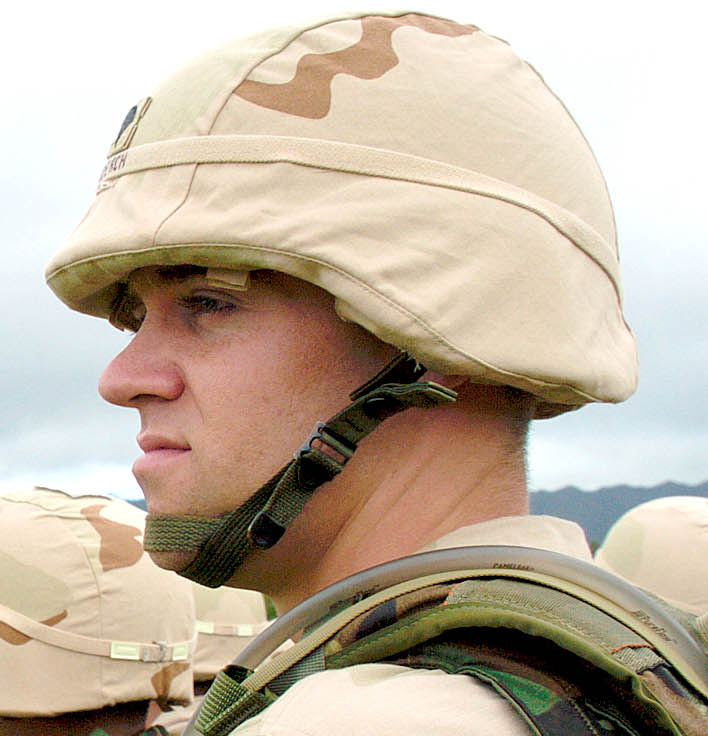
  PASGT Helmet

== Global War on Terror Era United States Army ==
- 2001 MICH Helmet - The Modular Integrated Communications Helmet is a "bump" helmet designed to replace the PASGT helmet. It was designed to be lighter and with more options for attaching equipment such as night vision goggles and headsets.
- 2003 Advanced Combat Helmet - This is the current helmet of the US Army and is an incremental improvement over the MICH helmet.
- 2020 AGSU Service "Crusher" Cap - While the Army has had some sort of round service cap since 1902, the Army Green Service Uniform (AGSU) came out with a "crusher" cap to honor and remind people of the Army Air Corps WWII pilots who wore them without the usual metal circular frame that stiffened the service cap.
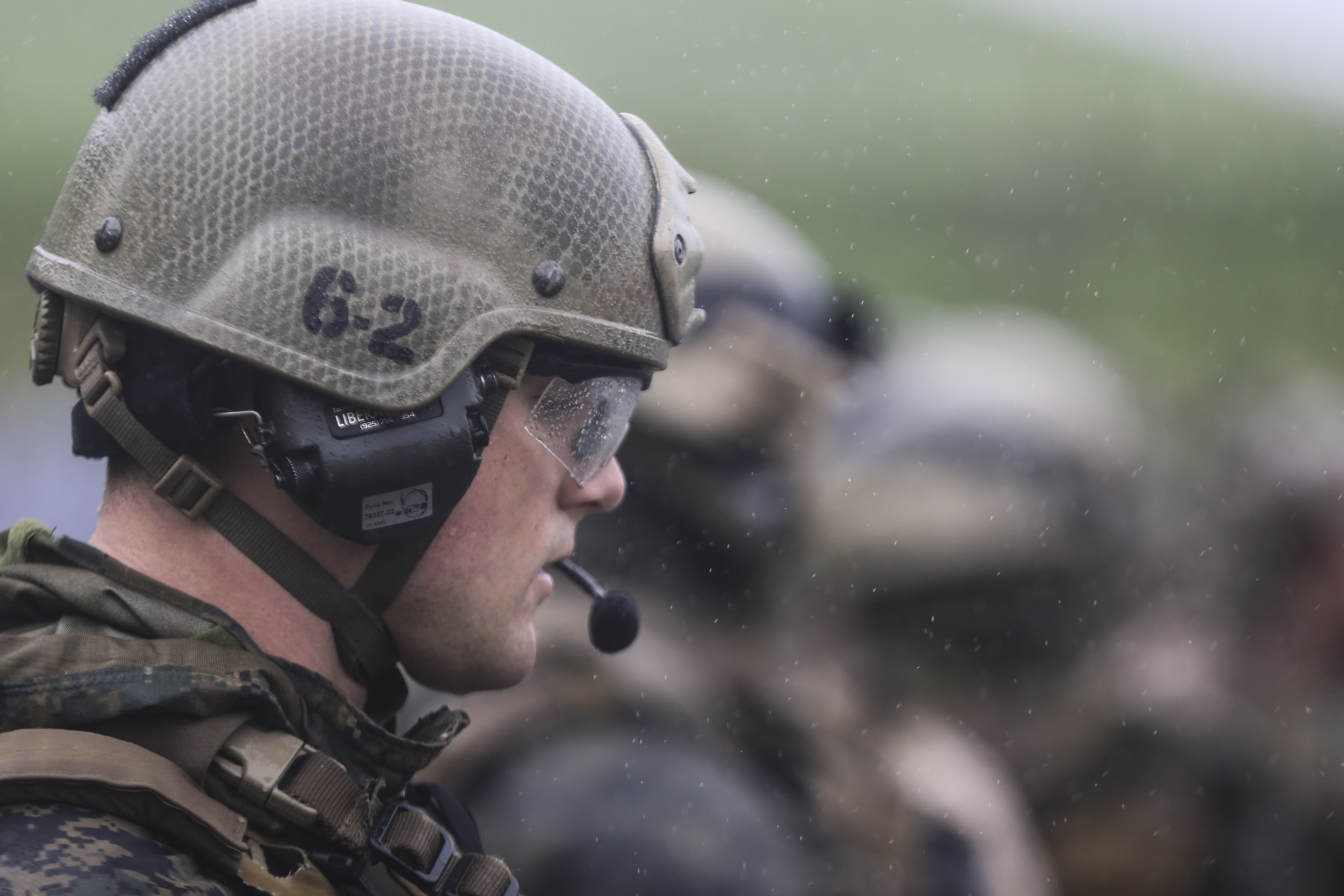
MICH Helmet

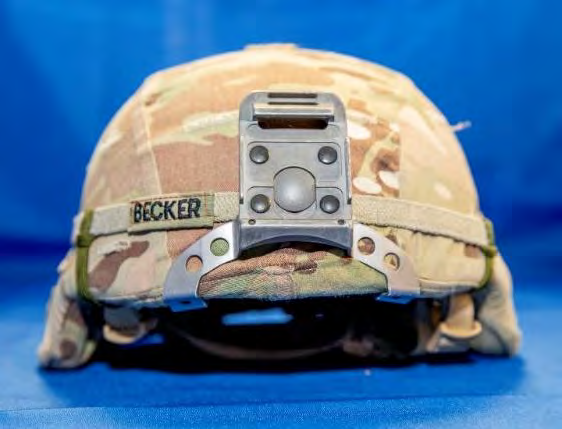
Advanced Combat Helmet

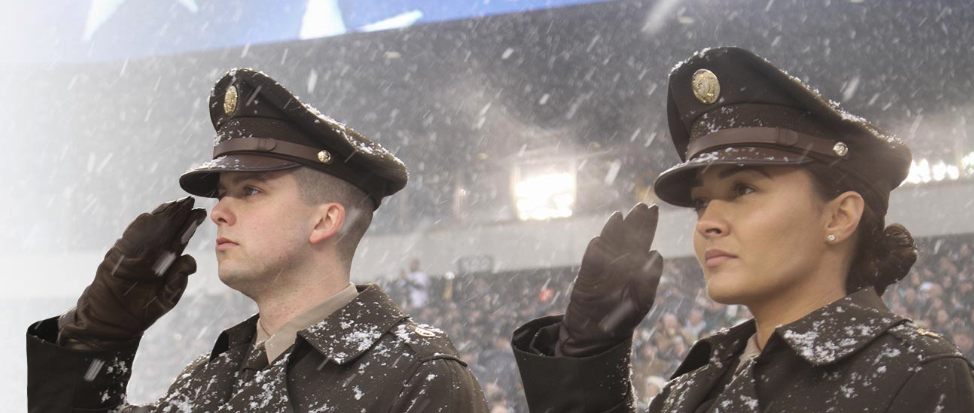
Crusher Cap

== See also ==
- Combat helmet
- Uniforms of the Union army
