= Hardee hat =

Mid-19th century clothing item of the United States Army

- The Model 1858 Army Hat with insignia for Company D, Sixth Infantry Regiment
- Designer: The Quartermaster Department
- Year: 1858
- Material: Felt

The Hardee hat, officially the Model 1858 Army Hat, was the full dress uniform hat worn by the United States Army during the Civil War. Named for Brevet Lieutenant Colonel William J. Hardee, it featured a 6 1/4 inch tall, rigid crown, 3 1/4 inch wide brim, and brass insignia. Nicknamed the “Jeff Davis,” it signaled formality—not function.

== History ==
The hat was first worn by the First and Second United States Cavalry when raised in 1855. The issue of this new headgear to these regiments as a substitute for the shakos and forage caps worn by the remainder of the army was initially a provisional one inspired by then Major William J. Hardee of the 2nd Cavalry (see below).

U.S. Army regulations specified that the hat should be adorned with a brass hat device and a wool hat cord denoting the branch of service of the wearer: sky blue for infantry, scarlet for artillery, and gold for cavalry. The brim was to be pinned up on the right side for cavalrymen and artillerymen, and on the left for infantry soldiers.

During the American Civil War most soldiers found the black felt hat to be too hot and heavy and shunned its use, preferring a forage cap or slouch hat. The unadorned, plain and often field-modified Hardee hat was, however, worn by Union troops, especially in the Western theater. The Hardee hat was most famously worn, and easily identified, as the hat worn by the Union Army's Iron Brigade, and it became their trademark and they were popularly known by the nickname "The Black Hats".

== See also ==
- Headgear of the United States Army
