= Order of the Spur =

- Certificate for induction into the Order of the Spur for combat action in Tal Afar, Iraq.
- Type: Order
- Awarded for: Completion of a spur ride or combat service in a cavalry unit.
- Description: Gold or silver spurs.
- Country: United States
- Presented by: United States Cavalry
- Eligibility: Military, foreign military, and civilian personnel.
- Status: Currently awarded
- First award: Unknown
- Final award: Ongoing

The Order of the Spur is a Cavalry tradition within the United States Army. Soldiers serving with Cavalry units (referred to as "Troopers") are inducted into the Order of the Spur after successfully completing a "Spur Ride" or for having served during combat as a member of or with a Cavalry unit. A trooper who has earned both Silver and Gold spurs is known as a "Master Spur Holder." Traditionally, each Trooper is presented spurs by his sponsor at a ceremonial dining in commonly referred to as the "Spur Dinner". The spurs are to be worn with the military uniform during Squadron or Regimental ceremonies and events or as designated by the Cavalry unit commander. In some units, gold spurs are awarded for combat inductions while silver spurs represent having completed the Spur Ride. Within the tradition, silver spurs and gold spurs hold a similar relationship for the cavalry as the Expert Infantryman Badge and the Combat Infantryman Badge hold in the U.S. Army Infantry, as well as the Expert Field Medical Badge and the Combat Medical Badge hold to U.S. Army Medics. There is no Military Occupational Specialty (MOS) requirement for the Order of the Spur and the order is open to members of foreign militaries serving with U.S. Cavalry units.

== History ==
The tradition of having to "earn your spurs" reaches back to the beginning of the American Cavalry. When green Troopers first arrived at their new cavalry assignments they were assigned a horse with a shaved tail. This led to the nickname "Shave Tail" for newly assigned, spur-less Soldiers. These new Troopers were in need of extensive training in all areas of horsemanship. The horse with a shaved tail was given extra space in which to operate since its rider was marked as a novice. New Troopers were given the “Prince of Wales Spurs” because they may misuse or overuse the actual rowel of real spurs, injuring the horse. Only when they were able to prove their ability to perform with their horse and saber were they awarded spurs.

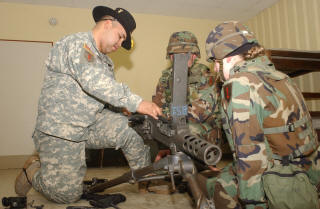
A spur holder with the U.S. 4th Cavalry Regiment instructs candidates on the assembly of an M2 Browning machine gun after their first try during a 2006 spur ride.

== Spur Ride ==
The Spur Ride is the only means of joining the Order of the Spur, aside from a wartime induction. The conduct of a Spur Ride varies but it is generally an event held over multiple days during which a Trooper must pass a series of physical and mental tests relevant to the Cavalry. Tests may evaluate leadership, technical and tactical proficiency, physical fitness, or the ability to operate as part of a team under high levels of stress & fatigue under both day & night conditions, though the specific tests vary by unit. A written test is often also administered, with questions that cover United States Cavalry and unit history. During the Spur Ride, candidates are also often required to recite from memory the traditional cavalry poem, "Fiddler's Green", or other traditions or historical information pertaining to the Cavalry.

The criteria for participation in the Spur Ride are set by each Cavalry unit, usually at the Squadron level. Many units require demonstrated leadership ability through planning and conducting unit-level training events such as gunnery ranges, soldier task training, or other non-commissioned and commissioned officer-level tasks. Some examples of minimum criteria are:

- Score a minimum of 400 on the Army Fitness Test (AFT), with a minimum of 80 points in each event.
- Meet height and weight requirements of AR 600-9.
- Qualify "Expert" with primary weapon (generally a M9 or M16/M4).
- Be recommended by a spur holder to the senior Troop/Squadron spur holder.

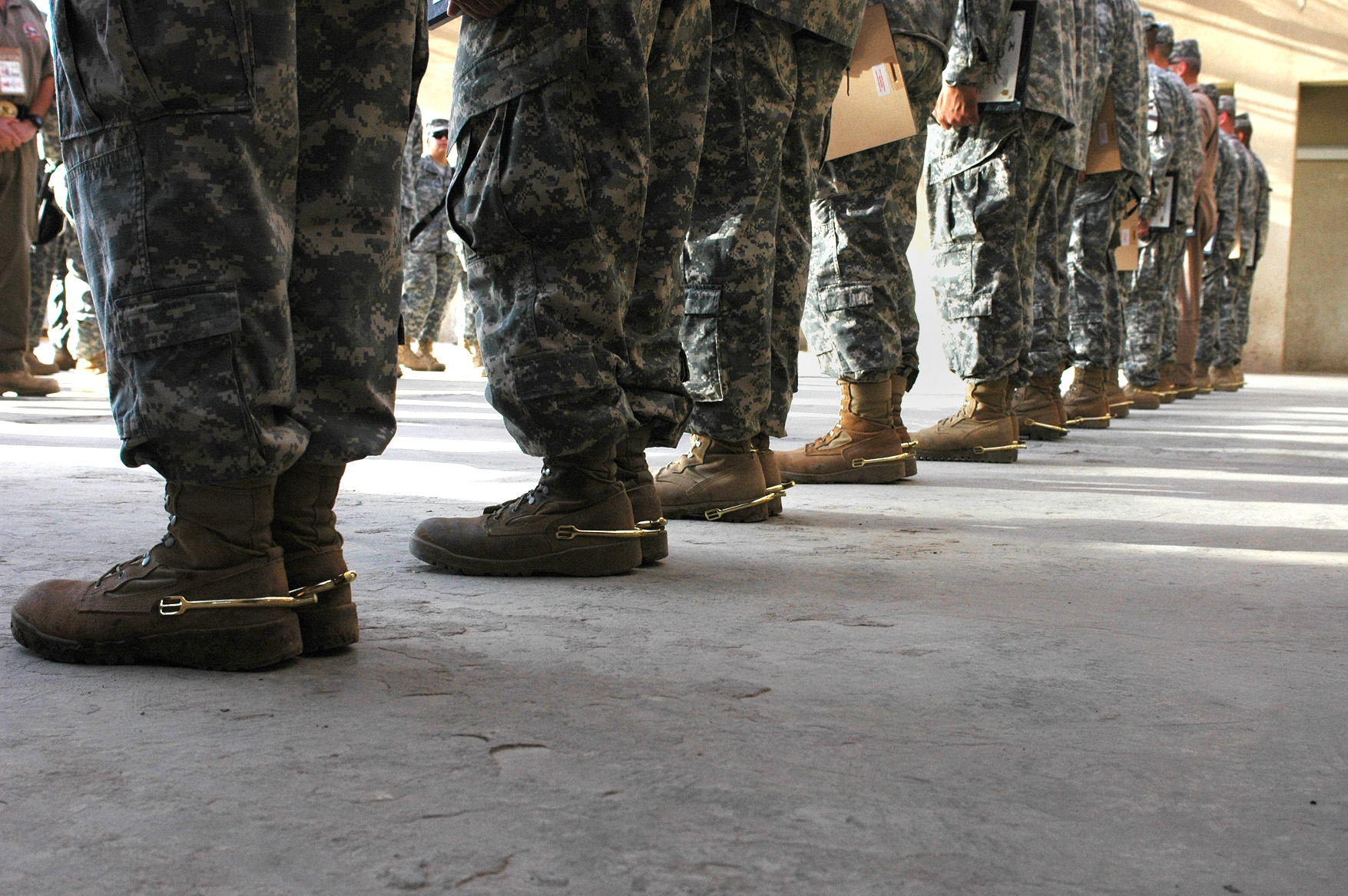
Soldiers from the 1st Air Cavalry Brigade "Warriors," 1st Cavalry Division, stand at attention after receiving their golden spurs during a ceremony held at Camp Taji, Iraq, October 2007

Upon successful completion of the Spur Ride, new spur holders are welcomed with a formal induction ceremony. The ceremony is a dining in, called the Spur Dinner, that often includes other military traditions such as honoring lost comrades, a ceremonial punch (called a grog), and a roll call of the successful candidates. Some units also hold a "hero's breakfast" immediately following the end of the Spur Ride. During the breakfast, the unit commander presents a toast welcoming the successful candidates to the brotherhood prior to the formal induction ceremony.

== Regulations ==
The U.S. Department of the Army classifies the Order of the Spur as an Army tradition, so regulations for induction into the Order of the Spur and the wear of cavalry accoutrements are set by each cavalry unit commander. Lacking any Army-wide regulations, standards differ from unit to unit, but the tradition remains the same. What follows is one example of a Cavalry Squadron's policy on the wear of Stetsons and spurs:

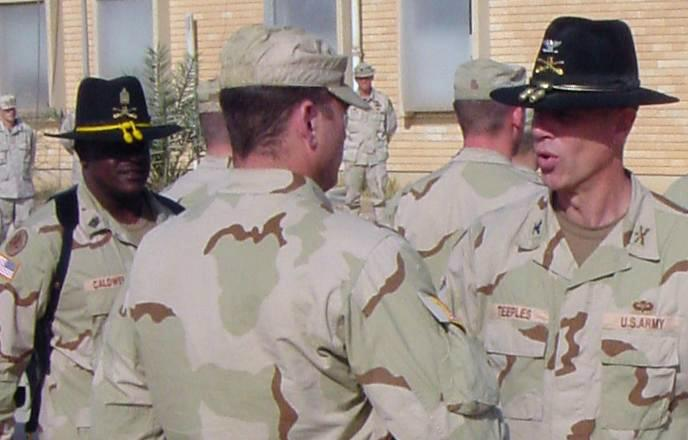
3d Armored Cavalry Regiment's Commander in Iraq wearing the Stetson.

Spurs worn on the U.S. Army's Desert Combat Boots.

Wear of Cavalry Stetson and Spurs

1. Stetson: The Stetson will be black in color. Rank and regimental or ordinary cavalry brass will adorn the Stetson. The braid will be worn around the base of the Stetson. Troopers will wear the appropriate braid color. Braid ends or acorns will be to the front of the Stetson and no more than an acorn length over the brim. Crossed sabers will be placed on the front of the Stetson. Organizational sabers are authorized if assigned or affiliated to the regiment. Rank will be worn 1/8" from the bottom of the sabers, centered.

a. General Officers: Solid Gold
b. Field Grade and Company Grade Officers: Gold and Black
c. Warrant Officer:

(1)CW4,CW5 - Solid Silver
(2)WO1,CW2,CW3 - Silver and Black

d. Non-Commissioned Officer: Yellow

(1) The nape strap will be threaded through the appropriate eyelets in the brim of the Stetson so that strap goes around the back and the buckle is fastened and centered on the wearers head.
(2) The sides of the crown shall not be pushed in or otherwise modified. The brim will be flat with a slight droop at the front.
(3) The Stetson will be worn on the head with the brim parallel to the ground.
(4) Occasions for wearing the stetson: Squadron dining-ins/outs, formal events in dress blues, gatherings of spur holders, professional gatherings such as AAAA and any other event or function as designated by Saber 6.

2. Spurs: Spurs will be worn as a matched pair. The type of spurs allowed are set by each unit but most often they are Prince of Wales style spurs.

a. Low Quarters: The spurs will be affixed to the footgear midway between the upper portion of the sole and the lower part of the heel along the seam of the shoe. The U shaped portion shall enclose the shoe in such a manner as to assure that the rowel of the spurs curves down to the ground. The strap will be fastened over the instep of the footgear in such a manner that the buckle faces to the outside of the foot.
b. Boots: The spurs will be affixed to the footgear so that the U shaped portion follows the seam of the ankle support. The strap will be fastened over the instep of the footgear in such a manner that the buckles face the outside of the boot.
c. Single Soldiers will wear the rowels of their spurs pointing up, while married Soldiers will do so with their rowels pointing down.

3. Occasions for Wear: Spurs and stetsons will be worn at all cavalry functions, otherwise, they will not be worn outside of the cavalry footprint. Stetsons and spurs may be authorized by the local command, but are not authorized for wear at Army functions not specifically dedicated to cavalry. Wear with civilian attire may be restricted by a local commander, but otherwise the spurs and Stetson may be mixed with civilian attire when rank has been removed.

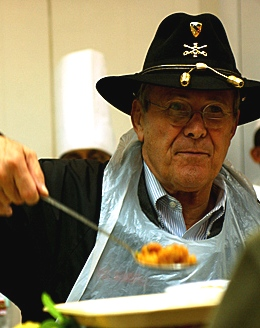
Former Secretary of Defense Donald Rumsfeld serves Christmas Eve chow to Soldiers deployed to Baghdad, Iraq. In place of rank, the secretary had a 1st Cavalry Division DUI pin.

=== Department of the Army Regulations ===
SOP for the Order of the Spur and Stetson for the 3d ACR Cav Division

1st Cav Order of the Spur and Stetson SOP

While the regulations governing the order of the spur are set by each cavalry commander (and so do not appear in the Army Regulation governing wear and appearance of uniforms and insignia), the practice falls under what the Army officially recognizes as a tradition. The following is from Field Manual 7-21.13 (The Soldier's Guide, dated 15 OCT 2003):

TRADITIONS

4-25. Tradition is a customary pattern of thought, action, or behavior held by an identifiable group of people. It is information, beliefs, and customs handed down by word of mouth or by example from one generation to another without written instruction. Our military traditions are really the "Army Way" of doing and thinking. An interesting thing about traditions is that many of our Army traditions started out as something quite different from what they are now.

4-26. Military tradition is an interesting and often amusing subject. It gives a Soldier a feeling of pride to understand just why we do things the way we do. Traditions are expressed in the things we do, the uniform we wear, and the things we say. Many of the words we use in the Army are unique and have been added to our vocabulary from different parts of the world and at different times in history.

4-27. Army traditions are the things that everyone in the Army does, everywhere. Unit traditions are the unique things that you do in your unit that other units may or may not do. Some unit traditions are—

- Ceremonial duties. Soldiers of the Old Guard, the 3d U.S. Infantry, have been Sentinels of the Tomb of the Unknown Soldier since 1948.
- The green berets of the Army's Special Forces.
- The tan berets of the Army Rangers.
- Airborne units' maroon beret.
- Cavalry units' spurs and hats. [Bold added]
- Special designations (authorized unit nicknames) such as Cottonbalers, the 7th Infantry Regiment.
- Distinctive items of clothing worn in your unit such as headgear, belt buckles, and tankers' boots.
- The promotion party.
- Unit mottoes such as "Victory!" or "Send me!"
- "Hooah!" This informal but always understood sound is less a word than an audible affirmation of the warrior ethos. The Soldier that utters that sound understands his task and will not quit until it is completed. That sound means Soldiers are ready and willing to accomplish the mission at hand.

== Relationship with the Cavalry Stetson ==
Like the Order of the Spur, the Cavalry Stetson is an Army Tradition and regulated by a soldier's unit commander. However, unlike the Order of the Spur, the Cavalry Stetson is usually worn by a Trooper immediately upon their assignment to a Cavalry unit. While the Cavalry Stetson holds a similar status to the Order of the Spur, for members of the cavalry the awarding and wearing of the Cavalry Stetson is distinct from the awarding and wearing of spurs. The cord around the Stetson, which in the past was used to assist with securing the Scout's horse to an object while the Soldier dismounted. Knots in the cord by the Acorns represented combat. Every half knot represented a single Combat Campaign. After two knots were given on a single Stetson, the wearer became the ‘SME’ (Subject Matter Expert) on the battlefield.

== See also ==
- Stetson
- Combat Cavalry Badge
