= Mulgan =

Mulgan is a surname. Notable people with the surname include:

- Alan Mulgan (1881–1962), New Zealand writer and broadcaster, father of John
- Edward Mulgan (1857–1920), New Zealand writer and educator, father of Alan
- Geoff Mulgan (born 1961), British academic
- John Mulgan (1911–1945), New Zealand writer and editor, father of Richard
- Richard Mulgan (1940–2024), New Zealand political scientist, son of John
- Tim Mulgan, New Zealand philosopher
