= A Man Alone =

(A) Man Alone may refer to:

- Man Alone, a 1923 film starring Hobart Bosworth
- Man Alone, a 1939 novel by John Mulgan
- A Man Alone (film), a 1955 Western directed by and starring Ray Milland
- A Man Alone (album), 1969 studio album by Frank Sinatra
- "A Man Alone" (Star Trek: Deep Space Nine), the fourth episode of the TV series Star Trek: Deep Space Nine
- Man alone, a literary antihero
