= Dominion of New Zealand =

British dominion in Oceania from 1907 to 1947

Coordinates: 41.2889°S 174.7772°E

- 1907–1947 (Note: Whether New Zealand's status as a British dominion ended in 1947 with the enactment of the Statute of Westminster Adoption Act 1947 is unclear. See the discussion in the "Dominion in disuse" section of this article.)
- Flag Coat of arms (1911–1956)
- Motto: "Onward"
- Anthem: "God Save the King"
- Status: Dominion of the British Empire
- Capital: Wellington
- Common languages: English, Māori
- Demonyms: British, New Zealander
- Government: Unitary parliamentary constitutional monarchy
- Monarch
  - 1907–1910: Edward VII
  - 1910–1936: George V
  - 1936: Edward VIII
  - 1936–1947: George VI
- Governor/Governor-General
  - 1907–1910: The 5th Baron Plunket (first)
  - 1946–1947: Sir Bernard Freyberg (last)
- Prime Minister
  - 1907–1912: Sir Joseph Ward (first)
  - 1940–1947: Peter Fraser (last)
- Legislature: General Assembly (Parliament)
  - Upper house: Legislative Council
  - Lower house: House of Representatives
- History
  - Declared a dominion: 26 September 1907
  - Statute of Westminster adopted: 25 November 1947
- Currency: New Zealand pound (Note: Before 1933 British and Australian coins circulated in New Zealand.)
- ISO 3166 code: NZ
Preceded by
Colony of New Zealand
German Samoa
Succeeded by
New Zealand
Trust Territory of Western Samoa
Cook Islands
Niue

The Dominion of New Zealand was the historical successor to the Colony of New Zealand. It was a constitutional monarchy with a high level of self-government within the British Empire.

New Zealand became a separate British Crown colony in 1841 and received responsible government with the Constitution Act in 1852. New Zealand chose not to take part in the Federation of Australia and became the Dominion of New Zealand on 26 September 1907, Dominion Day, by proclamation of King Edward VII. Dominion status was a public mark of the political independence that had evolved over half a century through responsible government.

Just under one million people lived in New Zealand in 1907 and cities such as Auckland and Wellington were growing rapidly. The Dominion of New Zealand allowed the British Government to shape its foreign policy, and it followed Britain into the First World War. The 1923 and 1926 Imperial Conferences decided that New Zealand should be allowed to negotiate its own political treaties, and the first commercial treaty was ratified in 1928 with Japan. When the Second World War broke out in 1939 the New Zealand Government made its own decision to enter the war.

In the post-war period, the term 'dominion' has fallen into disuse. Sovereignty on external affairs was granted with the Statute of Westminster in 1931 and adopted by the New Zealand Parliament in 1947. The 1907 royal proclamation of dominion status has never been revoked, although legal academics differ as to whether the proclamation can be said to be in force.

== Dominion status ==
=== Debate ===
The alteration in status was stirred by a sentiment on the part of the prime ministers of the self-governing colonies of the British Empire that a new term was necessary to differentiate them from the non-self-governing colonies. At the 1907 Imperial Conference, attended by New Zealand prime minister Joseph Ward, it was argued that self-governing colonies that were not styled 'dominion' (like Canada) or 'commonwealth' (like Australia) should be designated by some such title as 'state of the empire'. After much debate over lexicon, the term 'dominion' was decided upon. Ward then wrote to Lord Elgin, the colonial secretary, requesting that the name 'Colony of New Zealand' be changed to 'Dominion of New Zealand'.

The New Zealand House of Representatives passed a motion requesting that King Edward VII "take such steps as he may consider necessary" to make the change. The adoption of the designation of dominion would "raise the status of New Zealand", said Ward, and "… have no other effect than that of doing the country good". Ward also had regional imperial ambitions. He hoped the new designation would remind the world that New Zealand was not part of Australia. It would dignify New Zealand, a country he thought was "the natural centre for the government of the South Pacific". Dominion status was strongly opposed by Leader of the Opposition William Massey, an ardent British imperialist, who suspected that the change would lead to demands for increases in viceregal and ministerial salaries.

=== Royal proclamation ===
A royal proclamation granting New Zealand the designation of 'dominion' was issued on 9 September 1907. On 26 September the Prime Minister, Sir Joseph Ward, read the proclamation from the steps of Parliament:

Edward R. & I. Whereas We have on the Petition of the Members of the Legislative Council and House of Representatives of Our Colony of New Zealand determined that the title of Dominion of New Zealand shall be substituted for that of the Colony of New Zealand as the designation of the said Colony, We have therefore by and with the advice of Our Privy Council thought fit to issue this Our Royal Proclamation and We do ordain, declare and command that on and after the twenty-sixth day of September, one thousand nine hundred and seven, the said Colony of New Zealand and the territory belonging thereto shall be called and known by the title of the Dominion of New Zealand. And We hereby give Our Commands to all Public Departments accordingly. Given at Our Court at Buckingham Palace, this ninth day of September, in the year of Our Lord one thousand nine hundred and seven, and in the seventh year of Our Reign. God save the King

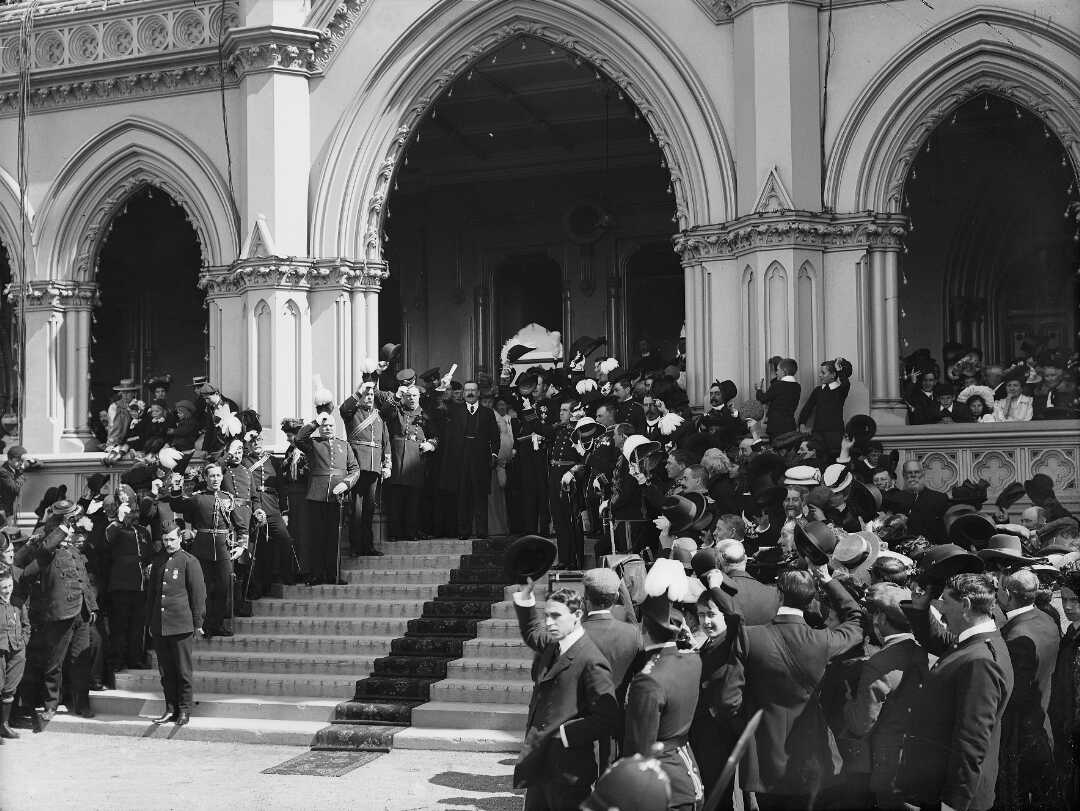
Lord Plunket declaring New Zealand a dominion, Wellington, 26 September 1907

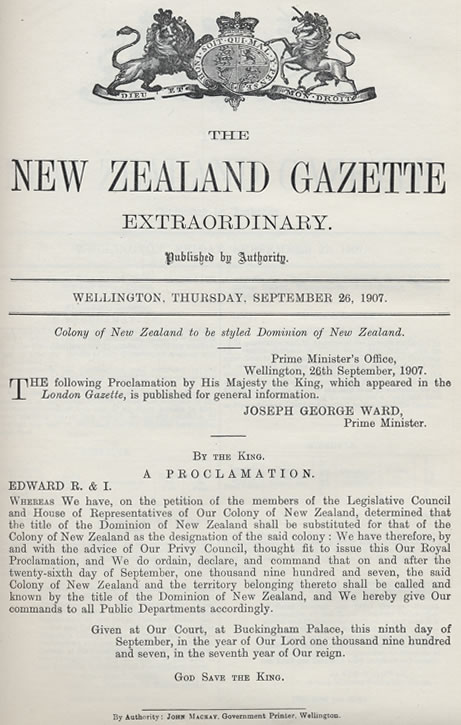
The New Zealand Gazette published the royal proclamation.

=== Effect and reception ===
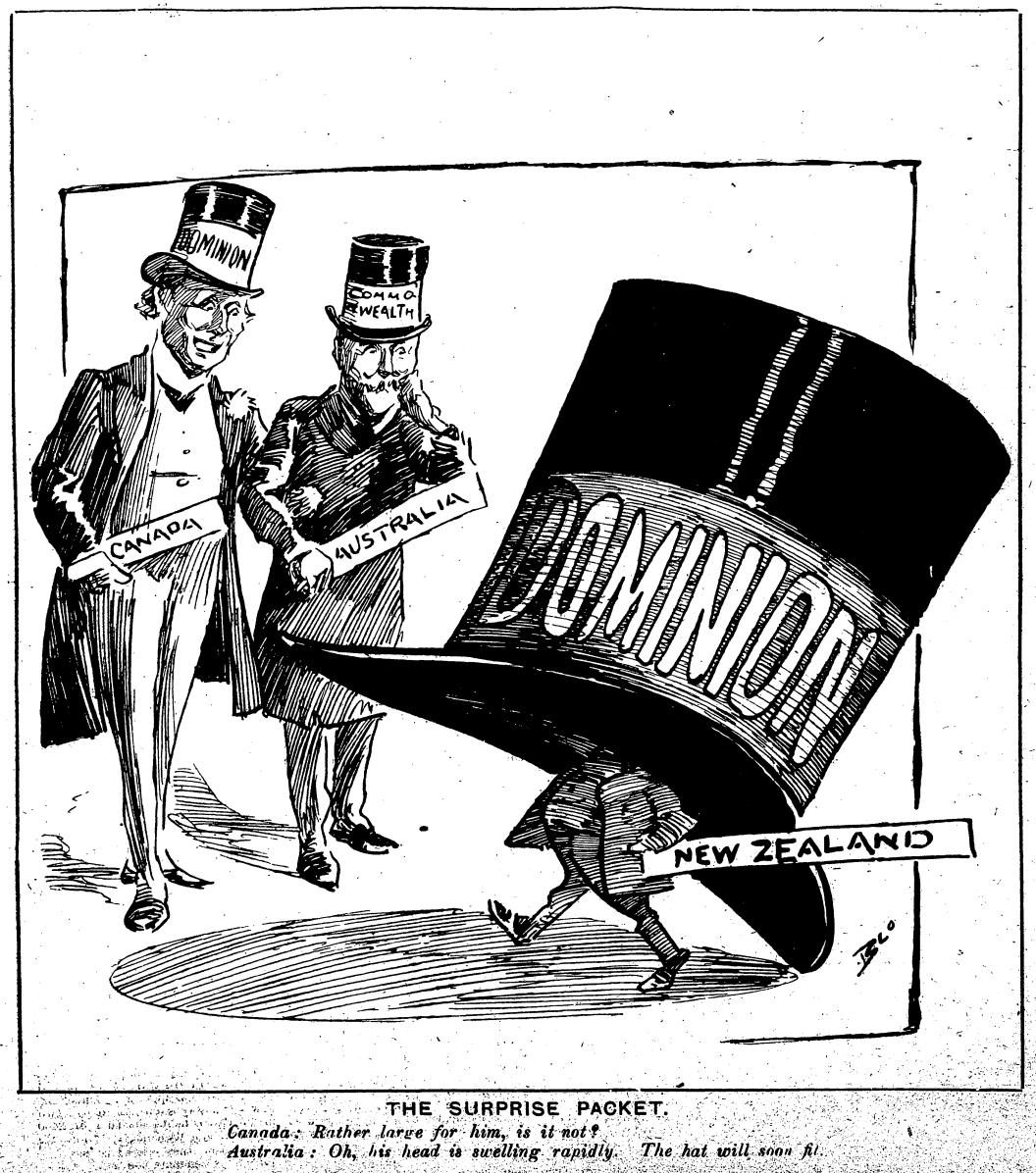
The New Zealand Observer (1907) shows Prime Minister Sir Joseph Ward as a pretentious dwarf beneath a massive 'Dominion' top hat. The caption reads: The Surprise Packet: Canada: "Rather large for him, is it not?" Australia: "Oh his head is swelling rapidly. The hat will soon fit."

With the attaining of dominion status, the colonial treasurer became the minister of finance and the Colonial Secretary's Office was renamed the Department of Internal Affairs. The proclamation of 10 September also designated members of the House of Representatives as "M.P." (Member of Parliament). Previously they were designated "M.H.R." (Member of the House of Representatives).

Letters patent were issued to confirm New Zealand's change in status, declaring that: "there shall be a Governor and Commander-in-Chief in and over Our Dominion of New Zealand". Dominion status allowed New Zealand to obtain a high degree of autonomy, while retaining the British monarch as head of state, represented by a governor appointed in consultation with the New Zealand Government. Control over defence, constitutional amendments, and (partially) foreign affairs remained with the British Government.

Joseph Ward had thought that New Zealanders would be "much gratified" with the new title. Dominion status was in fact received with limited enthusiasm or indifference from the general public, who were unable to discern any practical difference. Dominion status symbolised New Zealand's shift to self-governance, but this change had been practically accomplished with the first responsible government in the 1850s.

Historian Keith Sinclair later remarked:

… the change of title, for which there had been no demand, produced little public interest. It was largely regarded as Ward's personal show … it was merely cosmetic.

According to Dame Silvia Cartwright, 18th Governor-General of New Zealand, in a 2001 speech:

This event passed relatively unheralded. It attracted little comment. This illustrates that what may appear as a constitutional landmark, particularly from this point in time needs to be seen in its context. And so, although new Letters Patent and Royal Instructions were issued in 1907, and the requirement to reserve certain classes of Bill for His Majesty's pleasure was omitted, New Zealand certainly didn't embrace dominion status with the vigour of a young nation intent on independence.

The national flag, depicting the British Union Flag, remained the same. Until 1911 New Zealand used the royal coat of arms of the United Kingdom on all official documents and public buildings, but following its new status a new coat of arms for New Zealand was designed. A royal warrant granting armorial ensigns and supports was issued on 26 August 1911 and published in the New Zealand Gazette on 11 January 1912.

For a further decade, until 1917, the viceroy retained the title 'governor'; letters patent were issued re-designating the viceroy as 'governor-general' (as in other dominions). The new title better reflected New Zealand's prestige within the British Empire. The 1917 letters patent constituted the office, with the officeholder described as 'Governor-General and Commander-in-Chief in and over Our Dominion of New Zealand'.

Despite the new status, there was some apprehension in 1919 when Prime Minister Bill Massey signed the Treaty of Versailles (giving New Zealand membership of the League of Nations). This act was a turning point in New Zealand's diplomatic history, indicating that the dominion had a degree of control over its foreign affairs. Massey himself did not view it as a symbolic act and would have preferred New Zealand to maintain a deferential role within the empire.

== Dominion Day ==
To mark the granting of dominion status, 26 September was declared Dominion Day.

Today, its date remains only in the regional anniversary day of South Canterbury, held on the third Monday in September.

== Territorial expansion ==
The Antarctic territory of the Ross Dependency, previously under the sovereignty of the United Kingdom, is today regarded by New Zealand as having become part of the Dominion of New Zealand on 16 August 1923. The legality of that contemporary assertion has been questioned but is nonetheless the position of New Zealand.

The Cook Islands and Niue each already formed part of the Dominion of New Zealand on the date it was proclaimed. Both had become part of the Colony of New Zealand on 11 June 1901. Western Samoa was never part of New Zealand, having instead been the subject of a League of Nations mandate and subsequently a United Nations Trusteeship agreement. In 1982 the Judicial Committee of the Privy Council allowed Samoans born under New Zealand administration (i.e. prior to 1962) to claim New Zealand citizenship.

== Changes to dominion status ==
=== Balfour Declaration ===
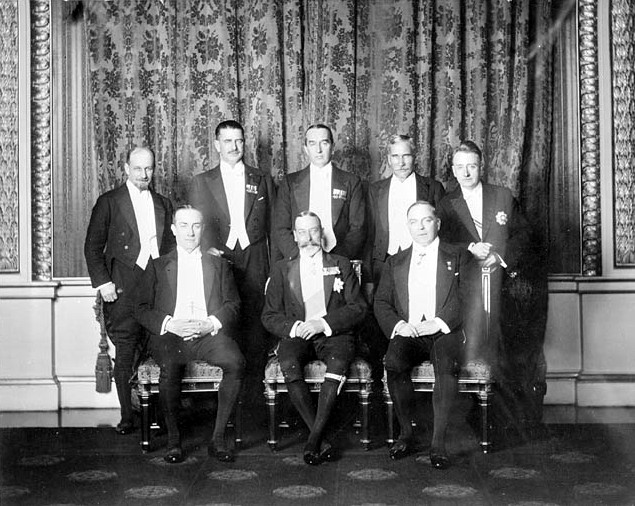
King George V with the prime ministers of the British dominions at the 1926 Imperial Conference (Note: Standing (left to right): Walter Stanley Monroe (Dominion of Newfoundland), Gordon Coates (New Zealand), Stanley Bruce (Australia), J. B. M. Hertzog (Union of South Africa), W. T. Cosgrave (officially styled as the President of the Executive Council of the Irish Free State). Seated: Stanley Baldwin (United Kingdom), King George V, William Lyon Mackenzie King (Canada))

The 1926 Imperial Conference devised the 'Balfour formula' of dominion status, stating that:

The United Kingdom and the Dominions are autonomous Communities within the British Empire, equal in status, in no way subordinate one to another in any aspect of their domestic or external affairs, though united by a common allegiance to the Crown, and freely associated as members of the British Commonwealth

— Balfour Declaration of 1926

The Balfour Report further resolved that each respective governor-general occupied "the same position in relation to the administration of public affairs in the Dominion" as was held by the monarch in the United Kingdom. Consequently, the only advisers to the governor-general (and the monarch in New Zealand) were his New Zealand ministers.

Prime Minister Gordon Coates, who led the New Zealand delegation to the conference, called the Balfour Declaration a "poisonous document" that would weaken the British Empire as a whole.

=== Statute of Westminster ===
In 1931, the British (Imperial) Parliament passed the Statute of Westminster, which repealed the imperial Colonial Laws Validity Act 1865 and gave effect to resolutions passed by the imperial conferences of 1926 and 1930. It essentially gave legal recognition to the "de facto sovereignty" of the dominions by removing Britain's ability to make laws for the dominions without their consent:

No Act of Parliament of the United Kingdom passed after the commencement of this Act shall extend, or be deemed to extend, to a Dominion as part of the law of that Dominion, unless it is expressly declared in that Act that that Dominion has requested, and consented to, the enactment thereof.

— Statute of Westminster, Section 4.

New Zealand initially viewed the Statute of Westminster as an "unnecessary legal complication that it perceived would weaken imperial relations." The New Zealand Government only allowed the Dominion of New Zealand to be cited in the statute provided that the operative sections did not apply unless adopted by the New Zealand Parliament. Preferring the British Government to handle most of its foreign affairs and defence, New Zealand held back from adopting the Statute of Westminster Act.

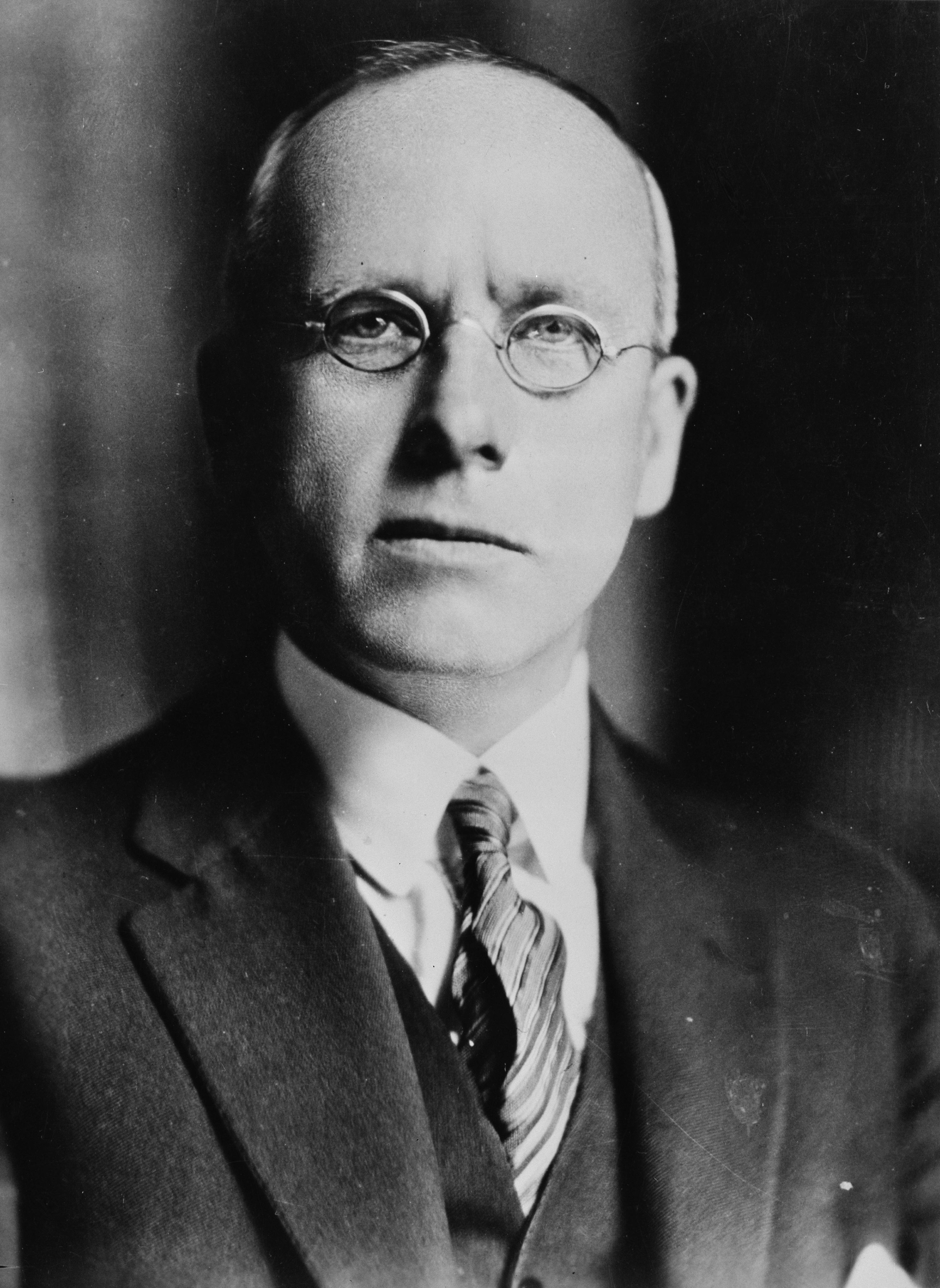
The Labour government of Peter Fraser adopted the Statute of Westminster in 1947.

The First Labour Government (1935–1949) pursued a more independent path in foreign affairs, in spite of the statute remaining unadopted. In 1938 Deputy Prime Minister Peter Fraser told Parliament, "this country has to make up its own mind on international problems as a sovereign country – because under the Statute of Westminster ours is a sovereign country". In the 1944 Speech from the Throne the Governor-General announced the government's intention to adopt the Statute of Westminster. It was forced to abandon the proposal when the opposition accused the government of being disloyal to Britain at a time of need. Ironically, the National opposition prompted the adoption of the statute in 1947 when its leader, and future prime minister, Sidney Holland introduced a member's bill to abolish the Legislative Council. Because New Zealand required the consent of the British Parliament to make the necessary amendments to the New Zealand Constitution Act 1852, Peter Fraser, now Prime Minister, had a reason to finally adopt the statute. It was formally adopted on 25 November 1947 with the Statute of Westminster Adoption Act 1947, along with consenting legislation from the British Parliament.

New Zealand was the last dominion listed in the statute to adopt it.

== 'Dominion' in disuse ==
After the Second World War, the country joined the United Nations as simply "New Zealand". A year later in 1946, Prime Minister Peter Fraser instructed government departments not to use the term 'dominion' any longer.

One of the first marks of New Zealand's sovereignty was the alteration of the monarch's title by the Royal Titles Act 1953. For the first time, the monarch's official New Zealand title mentioned New Zealand separately from the United Kingdom and the other dominions, now called Realms:

Elizabeth the Second, by the Grace of God of the United Kingdom, New Zealand and Her Other Realms and Territories Queen, Head of the Commonwealth, Defender of the Faith.

— Royal Titles Act 1953 (NZ), s 2; Royal Titles Proclamation (1953) II New Zealand Gazette 851

The name of the state in official usage was also changed to the Realm of New Zealand. (Note: In 1952 the Realm comprised New Zealand and its dependent territories, the Cook Islands, Niue, Tokelau, and the Ross Dependency in Antarctica. The Cook Islands and Niue later became self-governing states associated with New Zealand, in 1965 and 1974 respectively.) The term 'dominion' largely fell into disuse over the next decade. The term persisted the longest in the names of institutions (for instance, the Dominion Museum was not renamed the National Museum until 1972), businesses, and in the constitutions of clubs and societies. The Dominion Post, a newspaper formed by a merger of The Dominion (first published on 26 September 1907, the day New Zealand achieved dominion status) and The Evening Post, dropped "Dominion" to become The Post as late as April 2023.

The change in style did not otherwise affect the legal status of New Zealand or its Government; the 1907 royal proclamation of dominion status has never been revoked and remains in force today. As such, the term 'dominion' may be included in the formal title of New Zealand.

Nevertheless, the opinion of the New Zealand Government is that New Zealand became sovereign on foreign issues in 1947: "…both in terms of gaining formal legal control over the conduct of its foreign policy and the attainment of constitutional and plenary powers by its legislature". In passing the Constitution Act 1986 (effective 1 January 1987), New Zealand "unilaterally revoked all residual United Kingdom legislative power". Legal academics Dame Alison Quentin-Baxter and Janet McLean argue the 1907 proclamation should be regarded as "spent", albeit not revoked.

== See also ==
- History of New Zealand
- Independence of New Zealand
- Proclamation of accession of Elizabeth II
