= Bedggood =

Bedggood is a surname. Notable people with the surname include:

- Domonic Bedggood (born 1994), Australian diver
- Margaret Bedggood (1939–2026), New Zealand jurist and honorary professor
