= Richard Mulgan =

New Zealand political scientist (1940–2024)

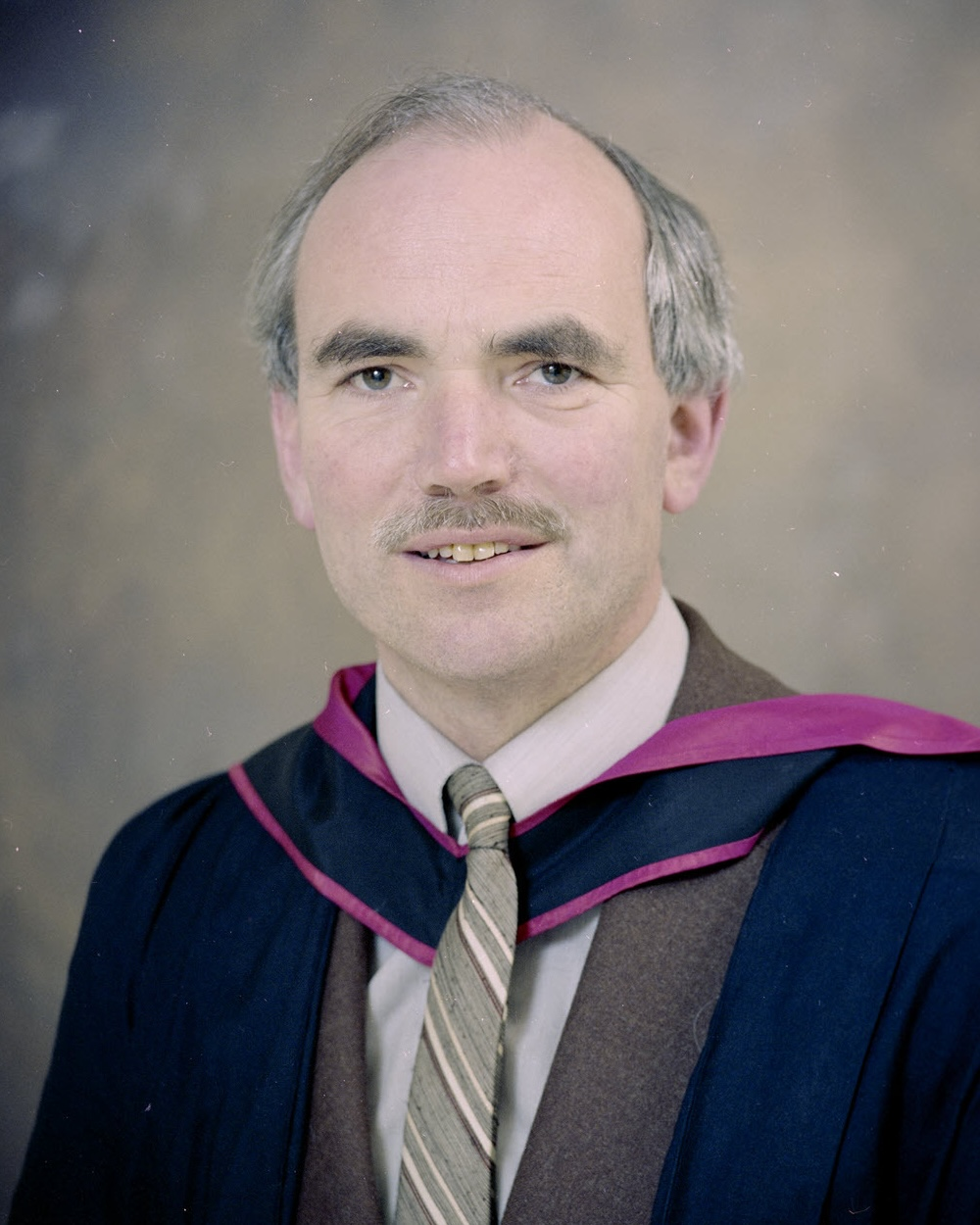
- Born: Richard Grant Mulgan; 5 March 1940; Oxford, Oxfordshire, England
- Died: 15 November 2024 (aged 84); Canberra, ACT, Australia
- Education: Merton College, Oxford
- Known for: Work on New Zealand's electoral system, and research into accountability
- Spouses: Margaret Bedggood (m. 1964); Aurelia George Mulgan
- Relatives: John Mulgan (father); Alan Mulgan (grandfather); Edward Mulgan (great-grandfather)
- Scientific career
- Fields: Political science

Richard Grant Mulgan (5 March 1940 – 15 November 2024) was a New Zealand political scientist who spent much of his career in Australia. He was on the 1985–86 New Zealand Royal Commission that recommended MMP (Mixed Member Proportional) representation for elections to the New Zealand Parliament.

Born in 1940 in Oxford, England, Mulgan was educated at the University of Auckland, and in 1960 matriculated at Merton College, Oxford. In 1964, he married Margaret Bedggood. He was later married to Aurelia George Mulgan, an academic specialising in Japanese politics and foreign policy.

Mulgan was professor emeritus at the Crawford School of Economics and Government, at the Australian National University in Canberra. Prior to his retirement in 2008, he was a professor of public policy there. He was also formerly professor of political studies at the University of Otago and the University of Auckland.

Mulgan was the son of John Mulgan, the grandson of Alan Mulgan, and the great-grandson of Edward Mulgan. He died in Canberra on 15 November 2024.

== Publications ==
- Democracy and Power in New Zealand (1984)
- Maori, Pakeha and Democracy (1989)
- Politics in New Zealand (1994, 1997; Auckland University Press) ISBN 1-86940-171-9
- Holding Power to Account: Accountability in Modern Democracies (2003) Palgrave MacMillan ISBN 978-0-333-98768-1
