= Slouch hat =

Wide brimmed hat, often for military use

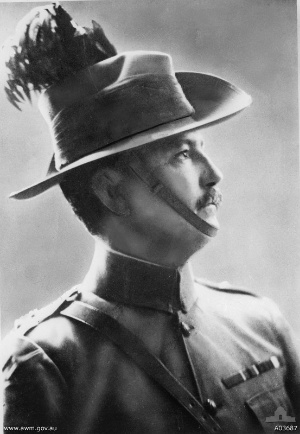
Frederick Bell VC, West Australian Mounted Infantry, Boer War

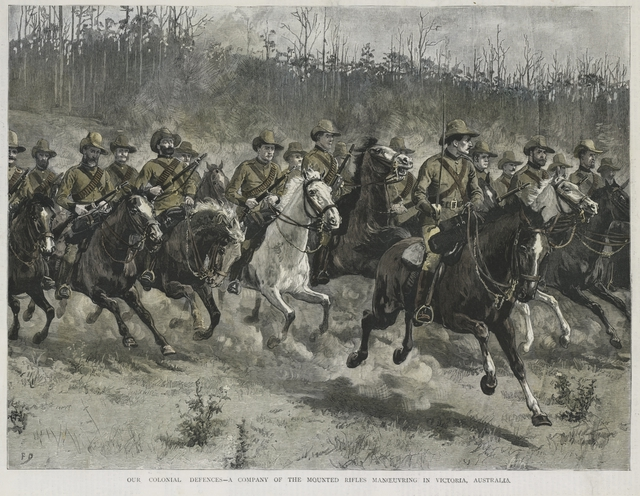
'A' Company of the Victorian Mounted Rifles on manoeuvres in Victoria in 1889

A slouch hat is a wide-brimmed felt or cloth hat most commonly worn as part of a military uniform, often, although not always, with a chinstrap. It has been worn by military personnel from many different nations including Australia, Ireland, the United Kingdom, Canada, Nepal, India, New Zealand, Southern Rhodesia, France, the United States, the Confederate States, Germany and many others. Australia and New Zealand have had various models of slouch hat as standard issue headwear since the late Victorian period.

Today it is worn by military personnel from a number of countries, although it is primarily associated with Australia, where it is considered to be a national symbol. The distinctive Australian slouch hat, sometimes called an "Australian bush hat" or "digger hat", has one side of the brim turned up or pinned to the side of the hat with a Rising Sun Badge in order to allow a rifle to be slung over the shoulder. The New Zealand Mounted Rifles wore a similar headdress but with the New Zealand military badge attached to the front of the cloth band (puggaree) wound around the base of the hat's crown.

== History ==
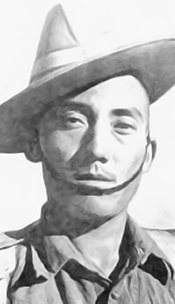
Naik Agansing Rai VC, 5th Gorkha Rifles (Frontier Force)

It was introduced into Australia around 1885, although it traces its military use back to Austrian skirmishers. The modern slouch hat is derived from the black "Corsican hat" (Korsehut) – historically used in the Austrian army during the Napoleonic Wars. The headwear saw primary use by 15 battalions of Austrian Jägers (skirmishers) and it featured an upturned brim, leather chinstrap and feather plume. The regular infantry also saw limited use of the Corsican hat in the periods 1803–06 and 1811–36.

A shortage of cork helmets led to the widespread use of the slouch hat amongst British Empire forces during the Second Boer War, where it was used by units including the City Imperial Volunteers (CIV), Imperial Yeomanry, and King Edward's Horse. An 1884 painting displayed in the regimental museum of the pipe band of 1st Battalion, Argyll and Sutherland Highlanders shows the unit in service dress, crossing the veldt in Zululand, wearing khaki slouch hats. After the war many armies rejected the once-popular headwear (as the British Army did in 1905), although it came back into fashion briefly during World War II during the Burma campaign and amongst troops serving in India and Southeast Asia at this time.

Platoon of German reservists in German New Guinea, after the outbreak of World War I, shortly before the arrival of the Australian Naval and Military Expeditionary Force in 1914.

The slouch hat in gray felt was worn by the Schutztruppe (protection force), the colonial armed force of Imperial Germany, as an alternative to the pith helmet, especially in South West Africa. Different coloured puggarees were worn by the Germans in South West Africa, German East Africa, German West Africa (Togo and Cameroon), German New Guinea and China. The hat had its brim pinned up on the right side with a cockade in the national colors and was worn with the home uniform as well. German colonial police units in South West Africa wore a khaki slouch hat with a small national cockade on the front and the right side pinned up by a metal Imperial crown device.

It became associated with the Australian military around the end of the 19th century, and since World War I it has been manufactured in Australia for the Australian Army by companies such as Akubra, Mountcastle & Sons and Bardsley Hats. The Australian military still wear the slouch hat with a Unit Colour Patch to identify their unit, and it has become a national symbol in Australia.

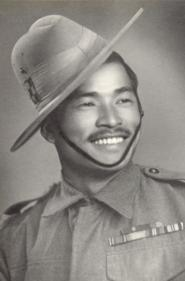
Bhanbhagta Gurung VC of the 3rd battalion, 2nd Gurkha Rifles.

The slouch hat or Terai hat is also associated with the Koninklijk Nederlands Indisch Leger (Dutch East Indies Army). It is worn by Gurkha regiments of the British Army and Indian Army (formerly the British Indian Army), but no longer worn on active service. The 2nd Gurkha Rifles became the first Gurkha regiment to adopt the slouch hat when they were issued with the Australian variant in 1901. The Gurkha terai hat is created by fusing two hats into one to make the hat more rigid and is worn at an angle, tilted to the right. The Chindits and other units of Field Marshal William Slim's British Fourteenth Army, who fought against the Japanese in the Far East during World War II, also became associated with the slouch hat (also known as the bush hat in the British Army). The slouch hat was also used by colonial units of the British Empire, including the Royal West African Frontier Force, the Canadian Yukon Field Force, Canadian Pacific Railway Militia, the Kenya Regiment and troops from Rhodesia.

== Users ==
=== Australia ===
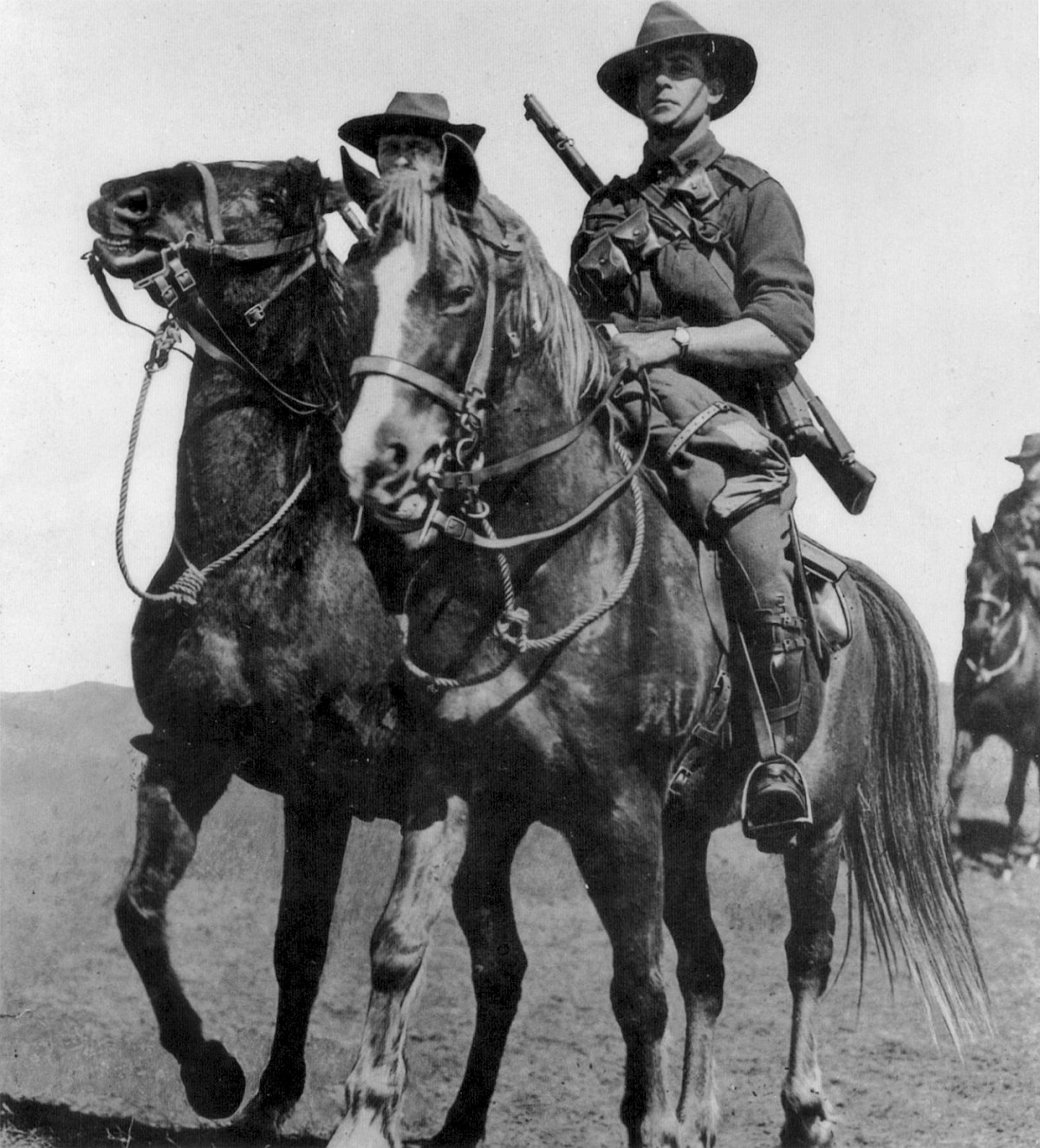
Australian Light Horse troops wearing slouch hats, November 1914.

The slouch hat was first worn by military forces in Australia in 1885 when the newly created Victorian Mounted Rifles adopted the hat as part of their uniform after their commanding officer, Thomas Price, had seen them worn by police in Burma. On 22 December 1890, the military commanders of the then separate Australian Colonies prior to the Federation of Australia met to discuss the introduction of the khaki uniform throughout Australia. They agreed that all Australian Forces with the exception of the Artillery would wear the slouch hat. It was to be looped up on one side—Victoria and Tasmania on the right and the other colonies (later states) on the left. This was done so that rifles could be held at the slope without damaging the brim. After Federation, the slouch hat became standard Australian Army headgear in 1903 and since then it has developed into an important national symbol.

The slouch hat (also known as a hat KFF, or hat khaki fur felt) is worn as the standard ceremonial headress for all members of the Army, except those belonging to units or corps that have an official headress such as a beret, and is treated with the utmost care and respect. It is also worn in some units as general duty dress. When worn for ceremonial purposes, the "Grade 1" Slouch hat is worn with a seven-band puggaree, six of which represent the states of Australia while the seventh represents the territories of Australia. A Unit Colour Patch is worn on the right of puggaree, while a Corps or Regiment Hat badge is placed to its front and the General Service Badge (The Rising Sun) worn on the left brim which is folded up and clipped into place.

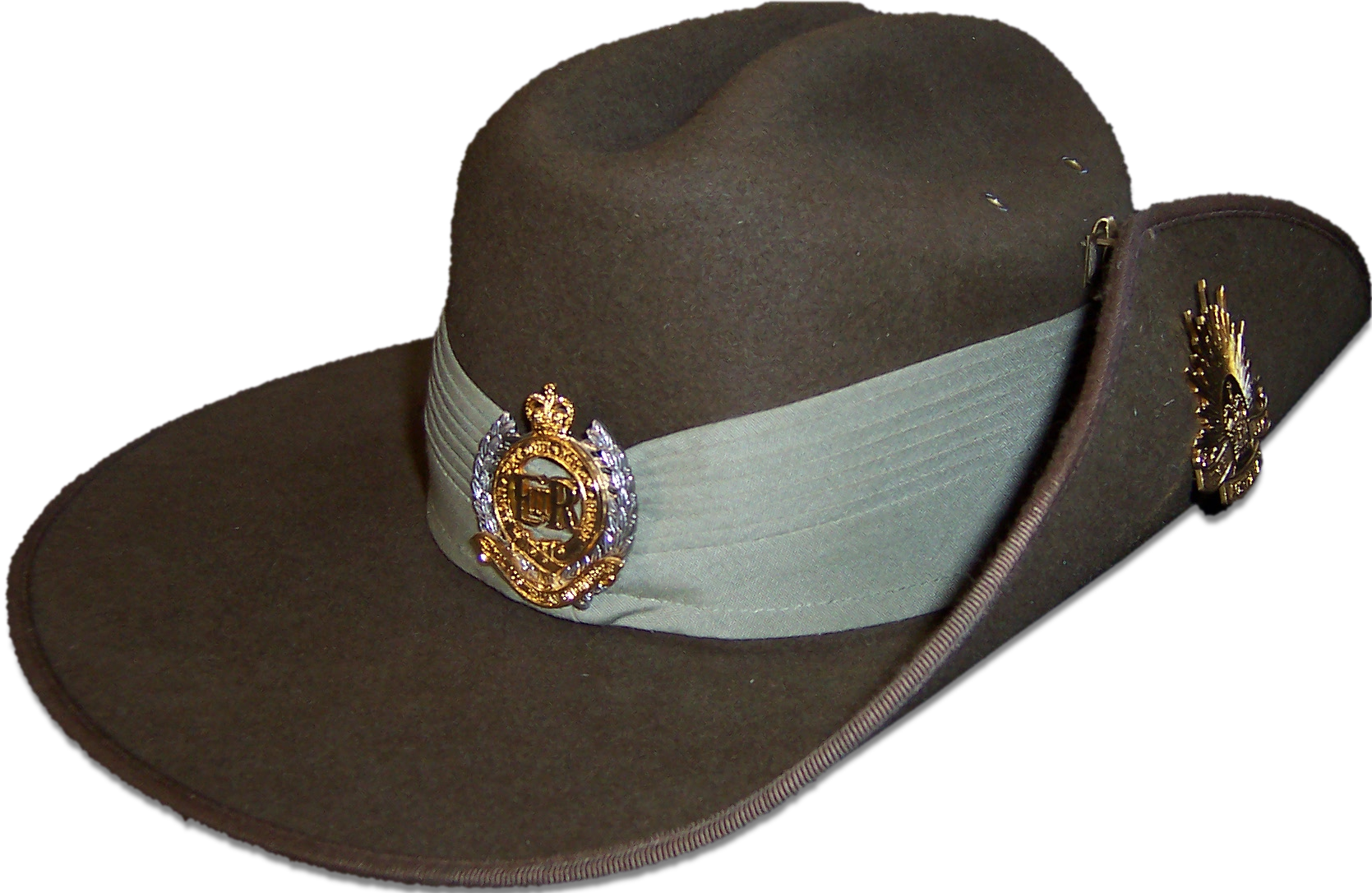
Australian Army Grade 1 Slouch Hat with Royal Australian Engineers corps badge

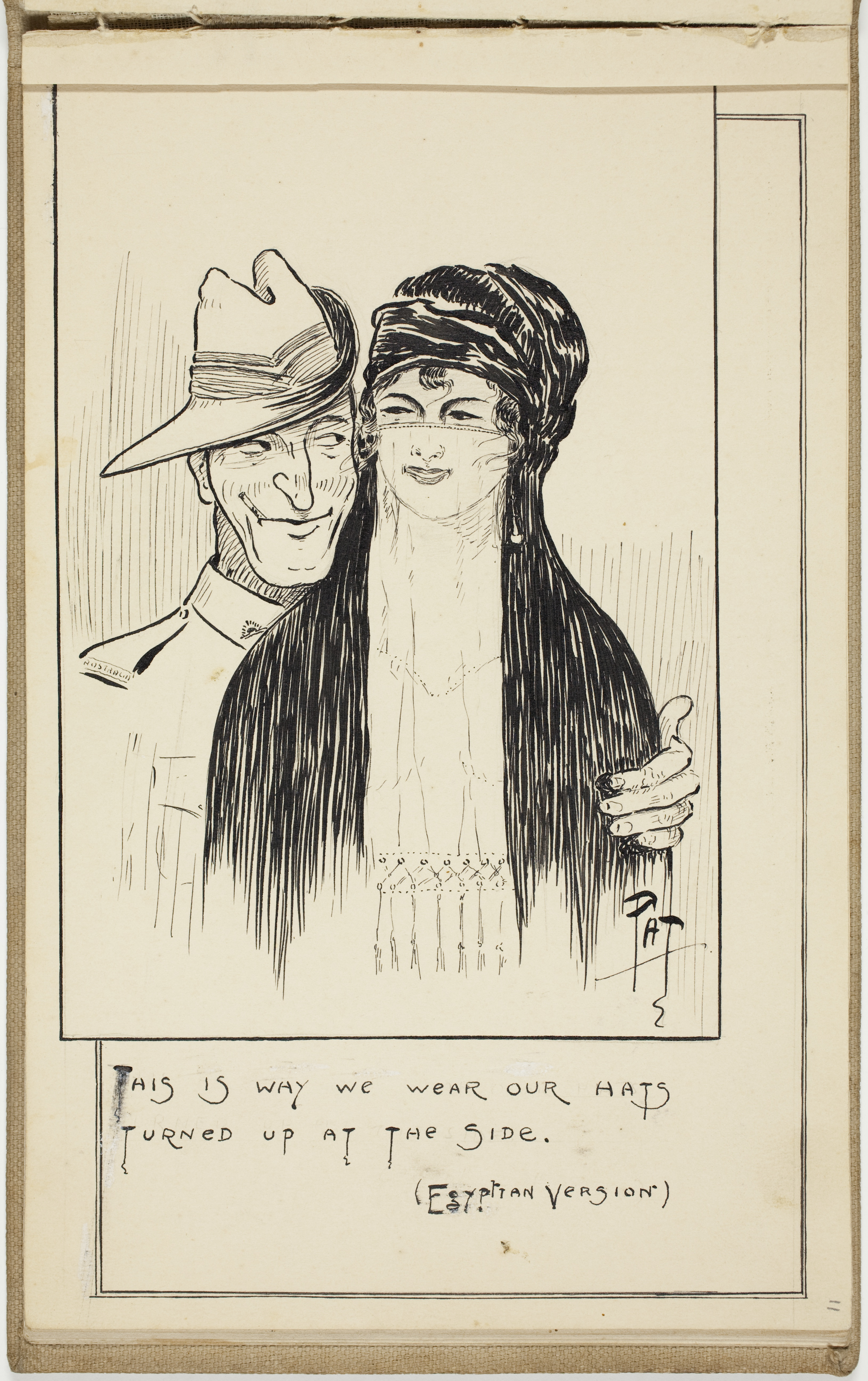
Usefulness of the brim-turned-up version (AIF)

The slouch hat worn by the Army is one of its trademarks, but it is not theirs alone: the Royal Australian Air Force wears the HKFF with a dark blue or "Air Force Blue" Puggaree, as a Non Ceremonial head dress for the RAAF; the Royal Australian Navy is also known to wear the hat when wearing camouflage and other uniforms, and has the same features as the RAAF's HKFF.

Soldiers from the 1st Battalion, Royal Australian Regiment (1RAR) wear a jungle green coloured puggaree with no colour patch, which dates back to traditions when serving in Malaya. Staff Cadets at the Royal Military College, Duntroon also wear a darker pugaree, however it contains eight pleats. The eighth pleat signifies the graduation of the first international cadet through the Royal Military College who hailed from New Zealand. They also wear the chin strap of the hat the opposite way around from that of the rest of the Army, as the first commander of the 1st Australian Imperial Force, William Throsby Bridges, was found wearing his slouch hat back to front when he was fatally wounded at Gallipoli.

Some units of the Royal Australian Armoured Corps such as cavalry and light horse regiments wear emu plumes behind the Rising Sun badge. This is a reference to a practice dating from World War 1, where Light Horsemen would chase down emus and steal their feathers to mount in their hat as a mark of their riding skill.

Members of the Australian Air Force Cadets and Australian Army Cadets both wear a slouch hat, referred to as it is by their parent branch: the AAFC calling it the HFFK, and the AAC calling it the KFF.

=== New Zealand ===
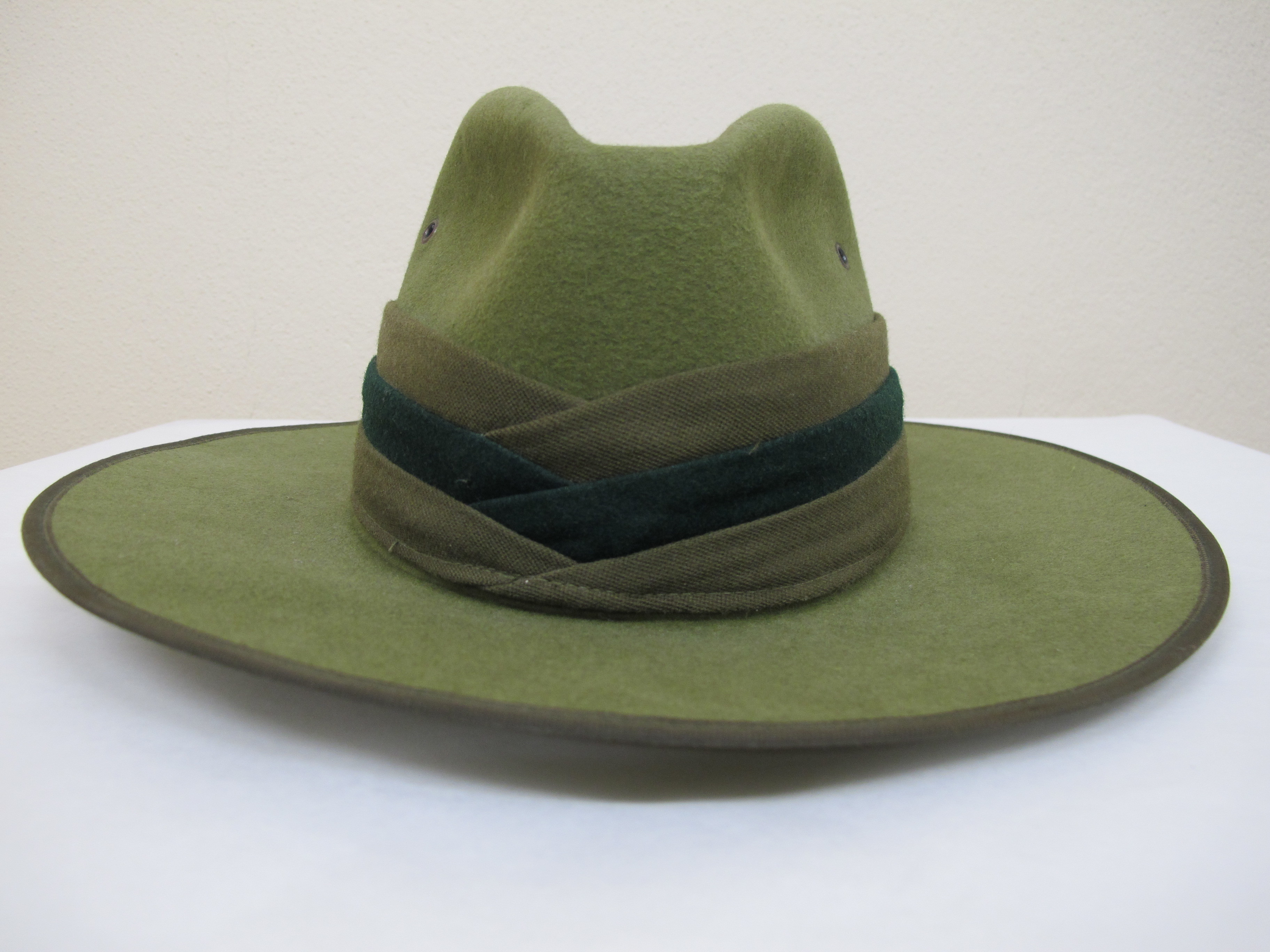
New Zealand Mounted Rifles Hat (without cap badge)

The NZ version of the slouch hat currently worn by the various corps and regiments of the New Zealand Army is known as the "Mounted Rifles Hat". The puggaree is always khaki-green-khaki, the original Mounted Rifles puggaree, with only the badge denoting the wearer's Regimental affiliation. Dating from the early 1900s, it was reintroduced for wear by Queen Alexandra's Mounted Rifles in the mid-1990s, but in 2000 its issue was broadened to all Corps for wear with working dress (influenced by such use by QAMR) as well as with service dress. As an alternative to the typical NZ army "lemon squeezer", the NZ Mounted Rifles Hat is worn on all but the most important occasions, where the lemon squeezer takes precedence. The slouch hat predates the introduction of the lemon squeezer hat (which did not appear until after the Boer War) and is worn brim down. Historic photographs indicate the brim to have been worn up in the Australian style on occasion. The term 'bush hat' is also associated with New Zealand culture such as the Bushman, Southern man and man alone stereotypes.

The New Zealand Police wear a variant of the bush hat in navy blue, normally in rural areas. Considered obsolete as main dress, it is now rarely worn instead of the standard peaked cap or recently (2021) introduced baseball cap.

=== Canada ===
During the North-West Rebellion of 1885 both non-uniformed and uniformed regiments in the Alberta Field Force, plus occasionally the North-West Mounted Police, wore slouch hats. Slouch hats were commonly worn by Canadian mounted regiments in the Second Boer War and occasionally by the Royal Canadian Regiment. Throughout the late Victorian era and early 1900s slouch hats were widely worn by the Canadian military, from the Yukon to South Africa.

Naval and air force personnel of the Canadian Forces serving overseas during the Gulf War were issued with white cotton duck hats.

=== Ireland ===
The Slouch hat was used extensively during the 1916 Rising and Irish War of Independence, most famously by Padraig Pearse, who wore one during The Easter Rising, which is now on display in Collins Barracks.

=== India ===
A few state police forces in India use slouch hats, or did so in the past. The Armed Reserve wing of the Kerala Police wore slouch hats up to the 1980s, but today the slouch hat is only worn by Recruit Trainee Police Constables (RTPC) during their training. The Armed Reserve policemen of Kerala Police now wear a blue peaked cap. The Karnataka Police continues to use slouch hats for its members in the lower ranks of the police (Constables and Head Constables), with the colours of the police unit embroidered on the turned-up brim. The number of the individual officer is also fixed onto the side of the brim. The Rajasthan Provincial Constabulary: the armed branch of the Rajasthan Police, also uses the slouch hat pinned up to the side, as the standard service and ceremonial headgear for all its Constables and Head Constables.

=== Nigeria ===
The uniform of Nigerian soldiers in the 1960s included a slouch hat, popularly known as "Banga Banga", although the term "banga-banga" also refers to the lower rank's fez.

=== United Kingdom ===
Some units of the British Army sent to South Africa during the Boer War adopted the slouch hat, particularly members of the Imperial Yeomanry, and retained its use on their return to the UK after the war. Though the Service Cap became standard after the formation of the Territorial Force in 1908, the Royal East Kent Mounted Rifles used them for ceremonial purposes until around 1910.

During World War II, British soldiers serving in the jungles of Burma often wore the slouch hat.

Post war, the Gurkhas are the only unit which retained the use of a version of the slouch hat. The primary version is the Terai hat, after the Terai region in Nepal. A version called the Double Terai has a double thick crown and brim for additional sun protection and durability.

=== United States ===
Unidentified soldier in Union uniform and slouch hat.

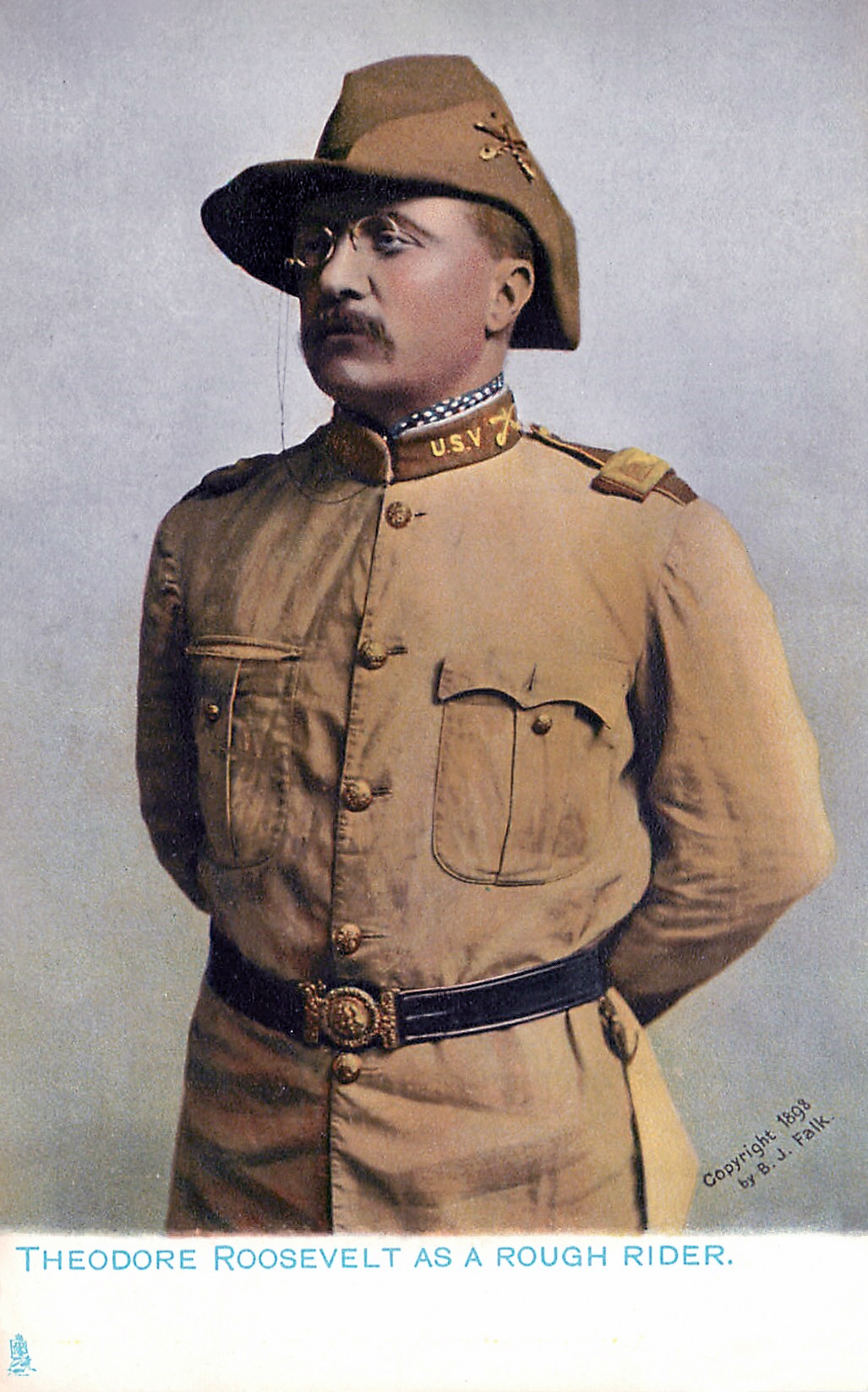
Theodore Roosevelt as a rough rider. Photomechanical print (postcard) : halftone, tinted. Published by Raphael Tuck & Sons, circa 1906.

The slouch hat has been known in the US military at least since before the American Civil War with the Pattern 1858 Union officer slouch being authorized. It was made from Beaver felt with a velvet hatband. Both Union and Confederate troops wore these hats during the war. The hat gained new popularity during the Spanish-American War when Theodore Roosevelt and his Rough Riders wore them.

The standard headgear for US soldiers in the Vietnam War in the 1960s was a fatigue baseball or field cap that offered little protection from the sun. Local tailors made a slouch hat in a style between a French type bush hat of the First Indochina War and an Australian type bush hat with a snap on the brim to pin one side up that was widely bought and unofficially worn by American troops in Vietnam. The local tailors usually used green fatigue cloth or leopard skin pattern military camouflage from old parachutes. The hat often had a cloth arc emblazoned with the word VIET-NAM on the brim. The US 1st Air Commando Group members officially adopted the green slouch hat on 22 May 1964 as their distinctive and practical headgear.

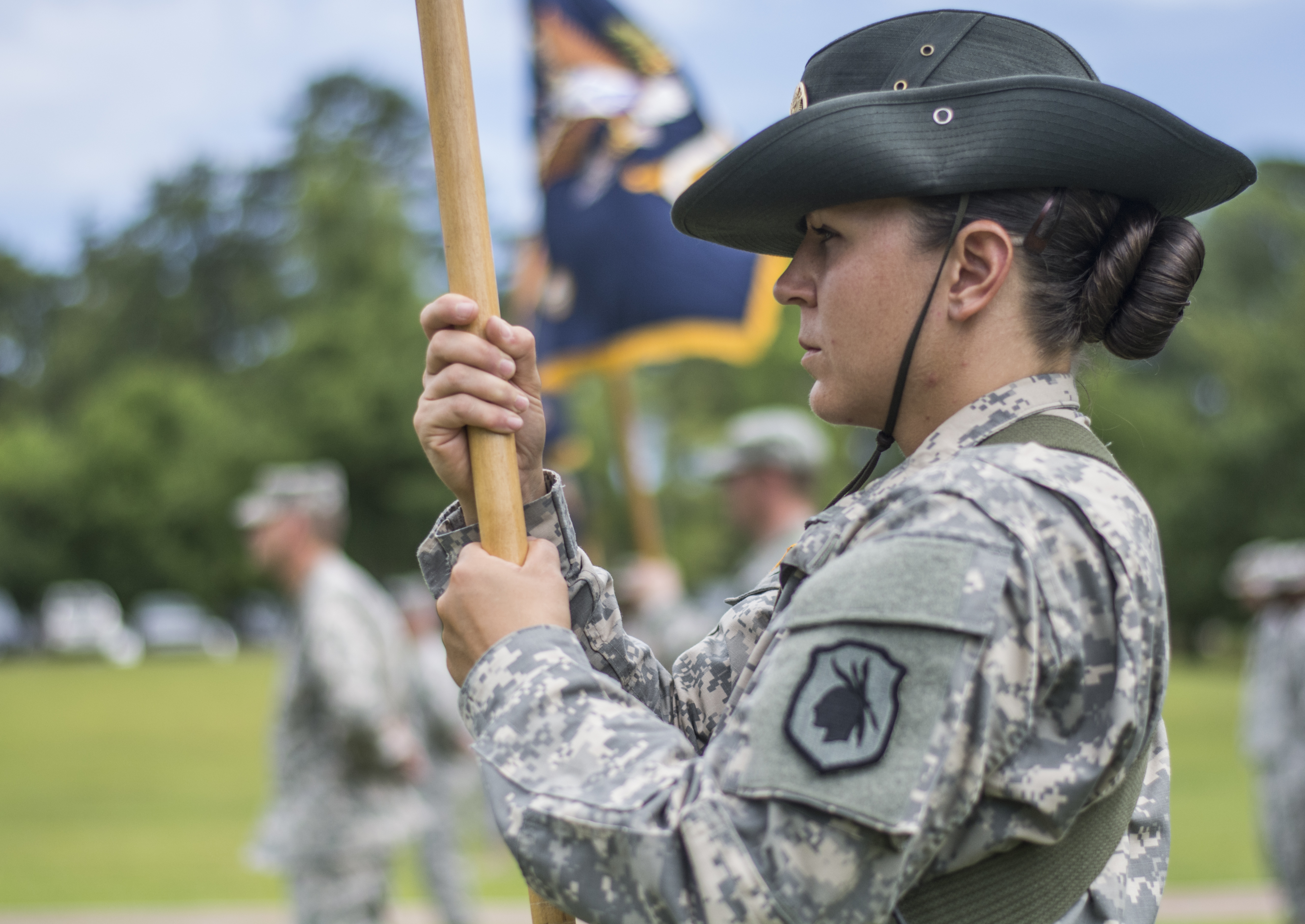
U.S. Army Reserve drill sergeant.

In 1972 the US Army authorized female drill sergeants to wear a bush hat based on the Australian design as their distinctive headgear. This was originally beige, but has been green since 1983. US Air Force and Space Force female drill instructors wear a blue version of the slouch hat.

=== Rhodesia ===
Prior to 1972, when the new 'greens' uniform was introduced, most corps and regiments of the Rhodesian Army wore slouch hats. The Rhodesian African Rifles and Grey's Scouts continued to wear the slouch after the introduction of the new uniform, although they were replaced with berets for working dress.

== See also ==
- Headgear of the United States Army

== Cited sources ==
- Brayley, Martin (2002). The British Army 1939–45 (3): The Far East. Men at Arms Series # 375. Osprey Publishing. ISBN 1-84176-238-5.
