= Southern man =

New Zealand stereotype

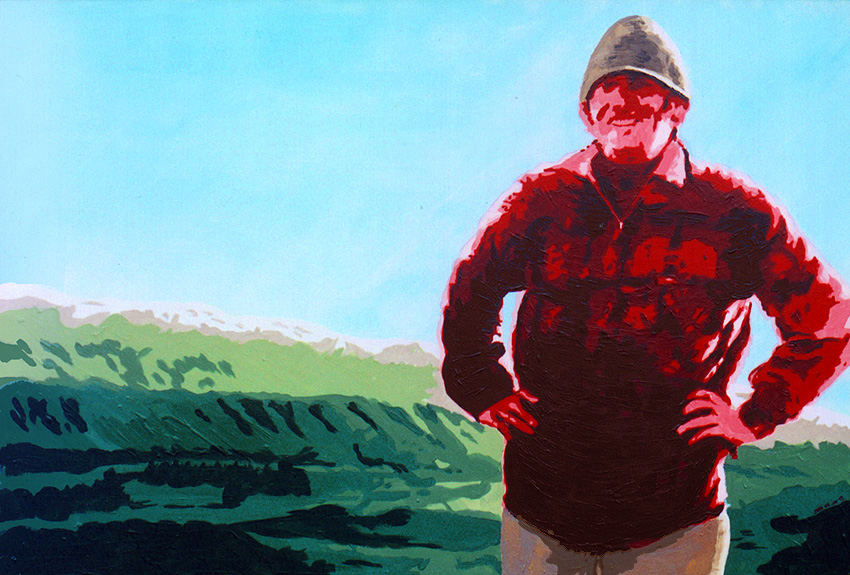
Southern Man (2002) painting by James Dignan.

In New Zealand, the southern man is a stereotypical man from the more rural South Island, well used to the solitude and conditions of open mountain or hill country, and completely out of his depth in the city. He is usually depicted as wearing an oilskin duster, Swanndri, and slouch hat, an image closely related to Kiwi stockmen. This stereotype is closely connected with a common trope in New Zealand fiction, the man alone.

The stereotype draws on images of high country farmers and hunters, particularly from areas such as Central Otago and the Mackenzie Basin, who work large sheep stations, often employing the horse and dog rather than mechanised transport, due to the terrain they have to cover. This archetypal New Zealand character, though strong in tradition, is one currently facing a threat to its existence in the outside world, thanks to changes in New Zealand's traditional rural ways of life.

== In popular culture ==
The stereotype became better known through the advertising campaign of Otago's best known pale lager beer, Speight's, in a series of advertisements that have been running since the early 1990s. Speight's sponsored the production of a bronze statue personifying the stereotype, "Southern Man" by Sam Mahon, which has stood at the entrance to Dunedin International Airport since 2000.

The stereotype was later acknowledged in the song "Southern Man", regarded as an unofficial anthem of Dunedin City and Otago in general. Written by ad agency creative director Roy Meares, with music by Murray Grindlay, this song was performed for Otago Rugby and Speight's Breweries by local musician Denis Henderson. The southern man has also been connected with the book and stage productions such as Richard Meros salutes the Southern Man.

The semi-autobiographical novels of Barry Crump, though set in the North Island, conform strongly to a similar stereotype. The character of Uncle Hec (played by Sam Neill) in the Taika Waititi film Hunt for the Wilderpeople — based on a Crump novel — is a big-screen personification of the North Island Bushman, of which the Southern Man character is a variation.
