= Terai hat =

Type of slouch hat associated with the Gurkhas

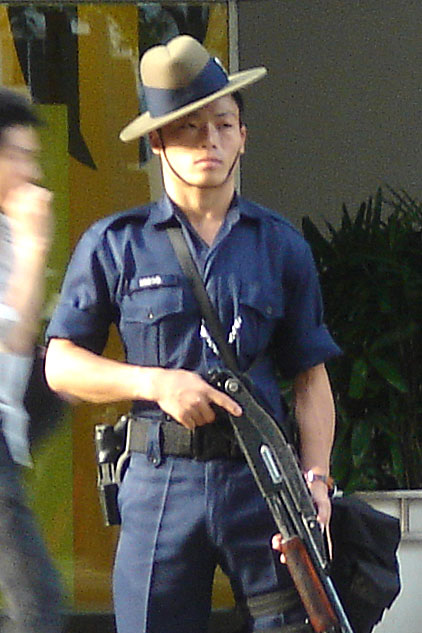
A Gurkha Contingent policeman wearing the Terai hat

The Terai hat is a type of slouch hat associated with the Gurkhas and named after the Terai region in Nepal. It is created by fusing two hats into one to make the hat more rigid and is worn at an angle, tilted to the right.

The double Terai is a version with a double thickness crown and brim, designed to give extra sun protection. This hat was almost de rigueur in East and Central Africa from the 1930s to 1950s.

In European use during the British Raj in India, the sola topi might be replaced with the felt Terai hat in the hills or during the cool season.

== See also ==
- List of hat styles
- Kukri
