= Constance Clyde =

New Zealand writer and suffragette

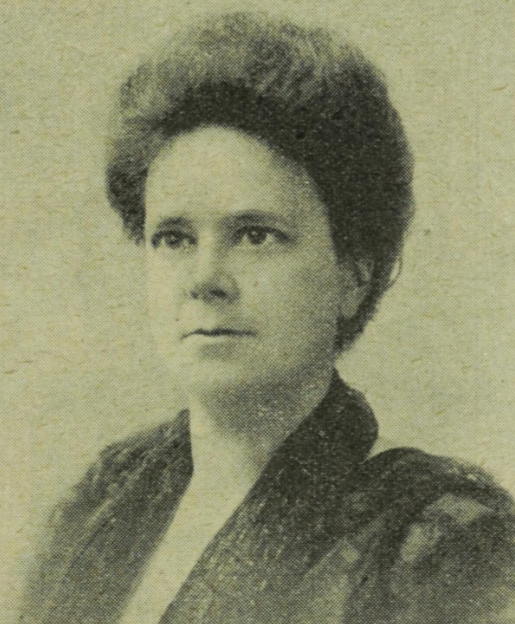
- Constance Clyde in her suffragette days
- Born: 1872; Glasgow
- Died: 1951 (aged 78–79); Brisbane
- Occupation: writer

Constance Jane McAdam (1872–1951), best known under her literary pseudonym Constance Clyde, was a Scottish-born New Zealand writer and suffragette. She also published under the name Clyde Wright.

== Life ==
Born in Glasgow to Mary (née Couper) and William McAdam in 1872, Clyde came to New Zealand as a child, and was educated at Otago Girls' High School. She moved to Sydney in 1898, and wrote for the Sydney Bulletin. In an essay entitled 'The Literary Woman', she urged women to continue "to make brilliant discoveries in the realm of the emotions".

In 1903, Clyde returned to the United Kingdom to pursue a London literary career. Her novel A Pagan's Love was published there in 1905: the novel raised questions of women's dependence, with the heroine considering an extra-marital relationship with a man. In 1907 Clyde was imprisoned in Holloway Prison as one of the suffragettes who 'caused a disturbance' in the House of Commons.

At some point, Clyde returned to New Zealand, and in 1925 co-authored a travel book with the journalist Alan Mulgan. In 1931 she was ejected from the New Zealand Parliament after protesting against the 1925 Child Welfare Act. In the early 1930s she moved to Brisbane. In 1935 she was imprisoned in Boggo Road Gaol after refusing to pay a fine for fortune-telling using tea-leaves. She died in August 1951, and was buried in Brisbane's Hemmant Cemetery.

== Publications ==
- A Pagan's Love. London: Fisher Unwin, 1905
- Will They Never Come. Melbourne: Australian Catholic Truth Society, n.d.
- (with Alan Mulgan) New Zealand, Country and People: An Account of the Country and Its People, 1925
