= Janet McLean =

New Zealand law academic

Janet McLean KC FRSNZ
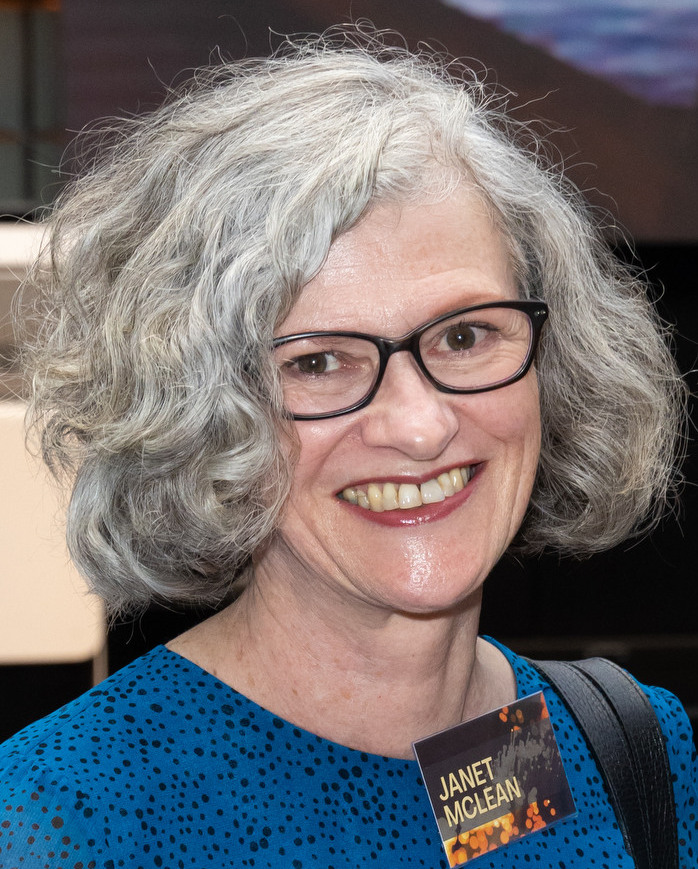
- McLean in 2022
- Spouse: Tim Mulgan

Academic background
- Education: University of Michigan
- Website: University of Auckland profile

Janet Margaret McLean KC FRSNZ is a New Zealand law academic. She is currently a full professor at the University of Auckland. Mcleans' interests include constitutional law, administrative law, legal method, comparative human rights law and common law theory. She is a Fellow of the Royal Society Te Apārangi.

== Career ==
After a LLB(Hons) at Victoria University of Wellington and an LL.M. at the University of Michigan, McLean worked for the New Zealand Law Commission and Victoria University of Wellington and then the University of Auckland from 1991 to 2006. Moving to University of Dundee as full professor, she returned to Auckland in 2011, again as full professor.

In December 2019, McLean was appointed as a Queen's Counsel.

In March 2021, McLean was made Fellow of the Royal Society Te Apārangi, in recognition that she "has transformed colonial and contemporary understandings of the nature of the Crown in the United Kingdom and Aotearoa New Zealand, including in the Tiriti o Waitangi."

== Selected works ==
- The province of administrative law 1997. ISBN 1901362019 (with Michael Taggart)
- Property and the constitution 1999. ISBN 1841130559
- Searching for the state in British legal thought : competing conceptions of the public sphere 2012. ISBN 9781107022485
- Quentin-Baxter, Alison; McLean, Janet (2017). This Realm of New Zealand: The Sovereign, the Governor-General, the Crown. Archived by the Wayback Machine: Auckland University Press. ISBN 978-1-869-40875-6. Archived from the original on 7 January 2018.

== Personal life ==
McLean is married to Tim Mulgan, professor of philosophy formerly at St Andrews University and then of the University of Auckland.
