= Alison Quentin-Baxter =

New Zealand constitutional lawyer (1929–2023)

Dame Alison Quentin-Baxter DNZM QSO
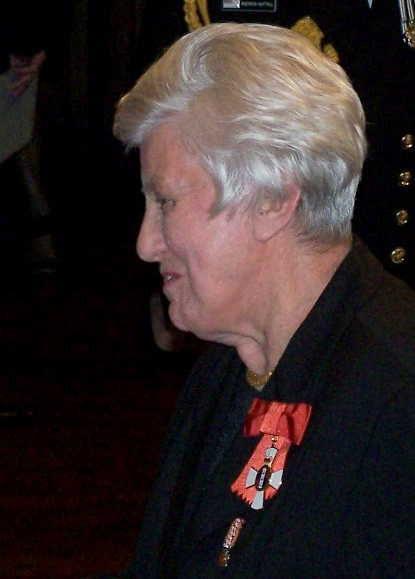
- Quentin-Baxter in 2009
- Born: Alison Burns Souter; 28 December 1929; Auckland, New Zealand
- Died: 30 September 2023 (aged 93)
- Education: Nga Tawa Diocesan School
- Alma mater: Auckland University College
- Occupation: Lawyer

Dame Alison Burns Quentin-Baxter DNZM QSO (née Souter; 28 December 1929 – 30 September 2023) was a New Zealand public and international lawyer. She advised a number of small island states on the drafting of their constitutional documents.

== Early life and education ==
Quentin-Baxter was born in Auckland on 28 December 1929 to Bill and Barbara Souter and grew up there. Both sets of her grandparents were farmers and she spent many holidays on their farms in the Waikato and Kaipara. She attended Epsom Girls' Grammar School and then Nga Tawa Diocesan School and studied law at Auckland University College where she became chair of the students' law society in her final year, the first woman to hold the position. On graduation, she declined an offer of a position in a leading city firm and instead applied to the Department of External Affairs for a job, as she was interested in international affairs and government. She was successful and started working in the department in 1951.

== Career ==
In the early 1950s, Quentin-Baxter represented New Zealand in New York on the Legal Committee of the UN General Assembly and was part of a New Zealand delegation to conferences in Geneva on maritime law. In 1956, she was promoted to head of the department's legal division, a position she held until 1960 when she was posted to Washington, D.C. as the first secretary in the New Zealand Embassy.

In late 1961, Quentin-Baxter resigned from her position as she was engaged, and married women did not normally continue in paid work at that time. Following her marriage, she and her husband spent two years in Tokyo before returning to Wellington, where she began teaching law at a polytechnic college. From 1967 to 1969, she taught constitutional history and law in the faculty of law at Victoria University of Wellington.

In 1970, Quentin-Baxter's husband was appointed a constitutional adviser to the Niue Island Assembly, and she accompanied and assisted him with the work of drafting a new constitution for the country. In 1974, the Niue Constitution Act was passed, incorporating the work of them both. Ten years later, in 1984, Quentin-Baxter was appointed to the Niue Review Group and the Niue Public Service Commission.

From 1977 to 1979, Quentin-Baxter served as counsel to the Marshall Islands Constitutional Conventions, and from 2002 to 2004 she served as an independent constitutional adviser to the members of the St. Helena Legislative Council. She also advised the Fiji Constitution Review Commission from 1995 to 1996.

In addition to these international roles, Quentin-Baxter was the director of the New Zealand Law Commission from 1987 to 1994.

== Personal life and death ==
Until his death in 1984, Quentin-Baxter was married to Robert Quentin Quentin-Baxter, also a constitutional lawyer; they worked together in Niue and the Marshall Islands. Quentin-Baxter died on 30 September 2023, at age 93.

== Publications ==
In 2017, This Realm of New Zealand: The Sovereign, the Governor-General, the Crown co-written with Janet McLean, was published.

== Honours and awards ==
In the 1993 Queen's Birthday Honours, Quentin-Baxter was appointed a Companion of the Queen's Service Order for public services. In 2003, she was awarded an honorary doctorate of Laws by Victoria University of Wellington.

In the 2007 Queen's Birthday Honours, Quentin-Baxter was appointed a Distinguished Companion of the New Zealand Order of Merit, for services to the law. In 2009, following the restoration of titular honours by the New Zealand government, she accepted redesignation as a Dame Companion of the New Zealand Order of Merit.
