= Margaret Bedggood =

New Zealand legal scholar (1939–2026)

Margaret Bedggood CNZM QSO
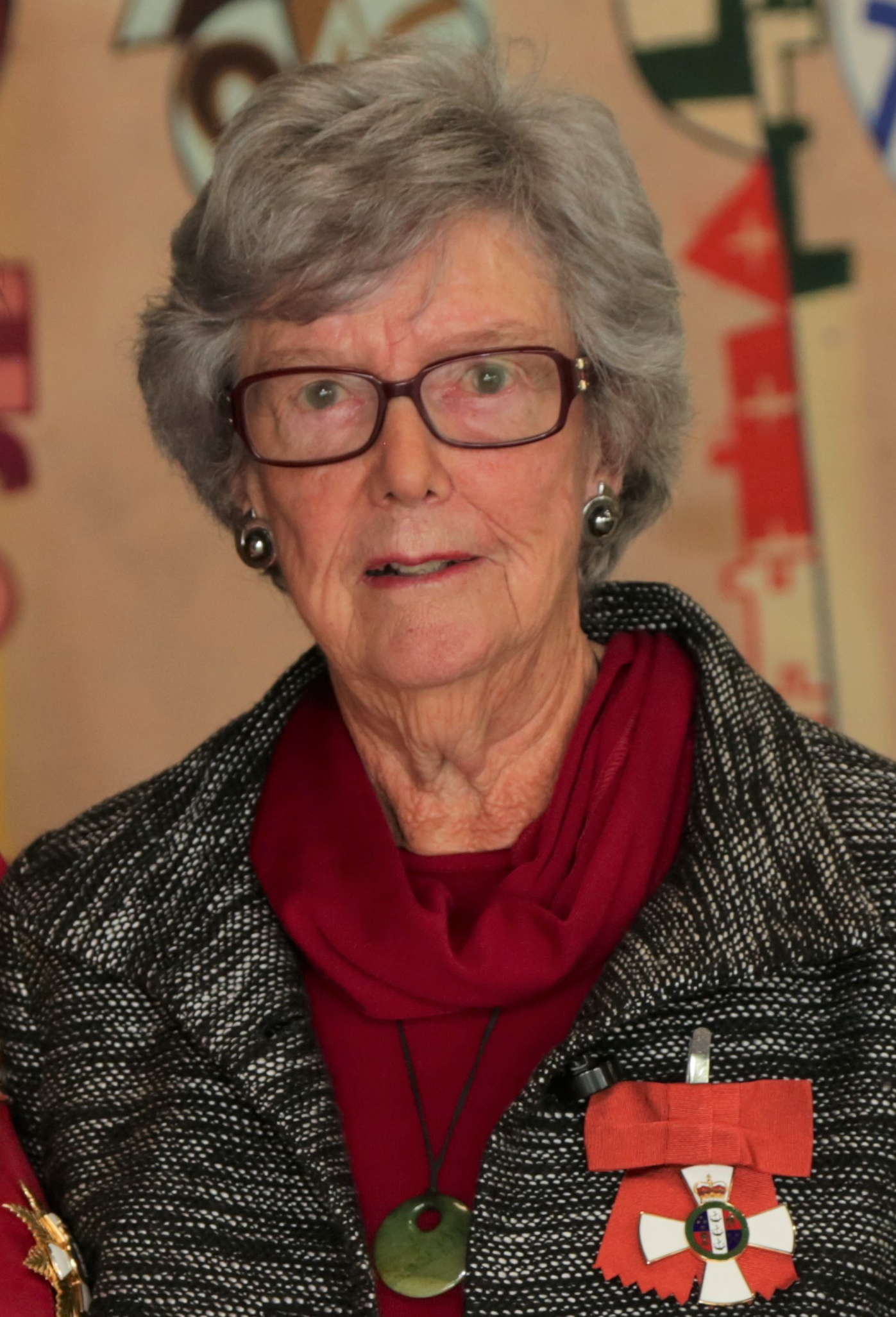
- Bedggood in 2019

3rd Chief Human Rights Commissioner of New Zealand
- In office 1989–1994
- Preceded by: John Wallace
- Succeeded by: Pamela Jefferies

Personal details
- Born: Margaret Ann Bedggood; 10 April 1939 Takapuna, New Zealand
- Died: 8 September 2026 (aged 87)
- Spouse: Richard Mulgan (m. 1964; sep. 1992)
- Children: 3
- Awards: New Zealand Suffrage Centennial Medal (1993); Honorary professor, University of Waikato (2010)

Academic background
- Education: University of Auckland; University College, London; University of Otago
- Influences: William Temple

Academic work
- Institutions: University of Otago; University of Waikato; University of Oxford

Margaret Ann Bedggood (10 April 1939 – 8 September 2026) was a New Zealand jurist and an honorary professor at the University of Waikato. Briefly known as Margaret Mulgan, she was the chief human rights commissioner for New Zealand from 1989 to 1994. Following this, she spent five years as dean of the Faculty of Law at the University of Waikato. Bedggood also taught at the University of Otago and tutored at the University of Oxford. Bedggood retired in 2003, but continued as an honorary professor and supervising students.

== Background ==
Bedggood was born in Takapuna on 10 April 1939, the daughter of John Thomas Bedggood and Caroline Bedggood (née Slaughter). She married Richard Mulgan in 1964, and the couple had three children before separating in 1992.

== Academic career ==
Bedggood completed a Master of Arts degree in Latin at the University of Auckland in 1960, a Master of Arts degree at University College London in 1964, and a Bachelor of Laws degree at the University of Otago in 1978. During the 1960s, she spent time tutoring classics in London, and observed the disparity of opportunity created by pervasive class discrimination. She credited this experience, and reading William Temple's book Christianity and Social Order, as creating her "desire to be an agent of change". Her move from classics to law at age 32 was motivated by the practicalities of having small children and her work with Amnesty International, of which she had been a member since 1968.

In 1970, Bedggood moved to Dunedin. From 1979 to 1989 she lectured in labour law at the University of Otago, being promoted to senior lecturer in 1986. While at Otago, she met Alexander Szakáts, who she described as "the brilliant pioneer of labour law in New Zealand".

In 1988, Bedggood was invited to apply to be the chief human rights commissioner and held the position from 1989 to 1994. During her tenure, the Human Rights Act 1993 was enacted. Following this, she spent five years as dean of the Faculty of Law at the University of Waikato.

She was a visiting fellow at Kellogg College, Oxford, and tutored in international human rights law. Bedggood retired in 2003, but retained a position as an honorary professor at the University of Waikato and continued to supervise students.

Bedggood served on the international board of Amnesty International from 1999 to 2005. She was on the Refugee Council of New Zealand, and was a trustee of the Aotearoa New Zealand Peace and Conflicts Studies Centre at the University of Otago.

== Personal life and death ==
Bedggood described herself as a "cradle" Anglican and was a member of the Third Order in the Society of Saint Francis. She died on 8 September 2026, at the age of 87.

== Honours and awards ==
Bedggood was awarded the New Zealand Suffrage Centennial Medal in 1993. In the 1993 Queen's Birthday Honours, she was appointed a Companion of the Queen's Service Order for public services. She was awarded an honorary doctorate by the University of Waikato in 2010. In the 2019 New Year Honours, Bedggood was appointed a Companion of the New Zealand Order of Merit, for services to human rights law.

== Selected works ==
- International human rights law in Aotearoa New Zealand. Margaret Bedggood, Kris Gledhill, Ian McIntosh. Wellington. 2017. ISBN 978-1-988504-29-2. OCLC 1027999836.
- Bedggood, Margaret (January 2010). "Studying the Law in Context: Exploring an International Dimension of New Zealand Law". Waikato Law Review: Taumauri. 18: 53–65 – via Informit.
- Bedggood, Margaret; Gledhill, Kris (2011). Law into action : economic, social and cultural rights in Aotearoa New Zealand. Thomson Reuters. ISBN 978-0-86472-723-7. OCLC 707893993.
