= Edward Mulgan =

Farmer, newspaper editor, teacher, school inspector (1857–1920)

Edward Ker Mulgan (1857 – 14 November 1920) was a New Zealand farmer, author, newspaper editor, teacher and school inspector. He was born in Ballynahinch, County Down, Ireland in about 1857.

He was the father of Alan Edward Mulgan and grandfather of John Mulgan.

== Published works ==
- The New Zealand Nature-Study Book: A Guide to the Nature Study Section of the New Syllabus (1905)
- The New Zealand Citizen: An Elementary Account of the Citizen's Rights and Duties and the Work of Government (with Alan Mulgan) (1914, and later editions)
