= Man alone =

Literary stock character

The man alone is a literary stock character. Usually an antihero, he is similar to the Byronic hero. The man alone tends to epitomise existentialism, and, in the words of the academic E. H. McCormick is "the solitary, rootless nonconformist, who in a variety of forms crops up persistently in New Zealand writing".

Men alone figure frequently in the literature of newly settled or recently colonised countries such as Australia and especially New Zealand, and the term is likely to have found popularity with the publication of the "Great Kiwi Novel", Man Alone by John Mulgan in 1939 (this novel's title itself originated in a quotation from Ernest Hemingway's To Have and Have Not).

== See also ==
- Southern man
