= Alan Mulgan =

New Zealand journalist, writer and broadcaster

Alan Mulgan OBE
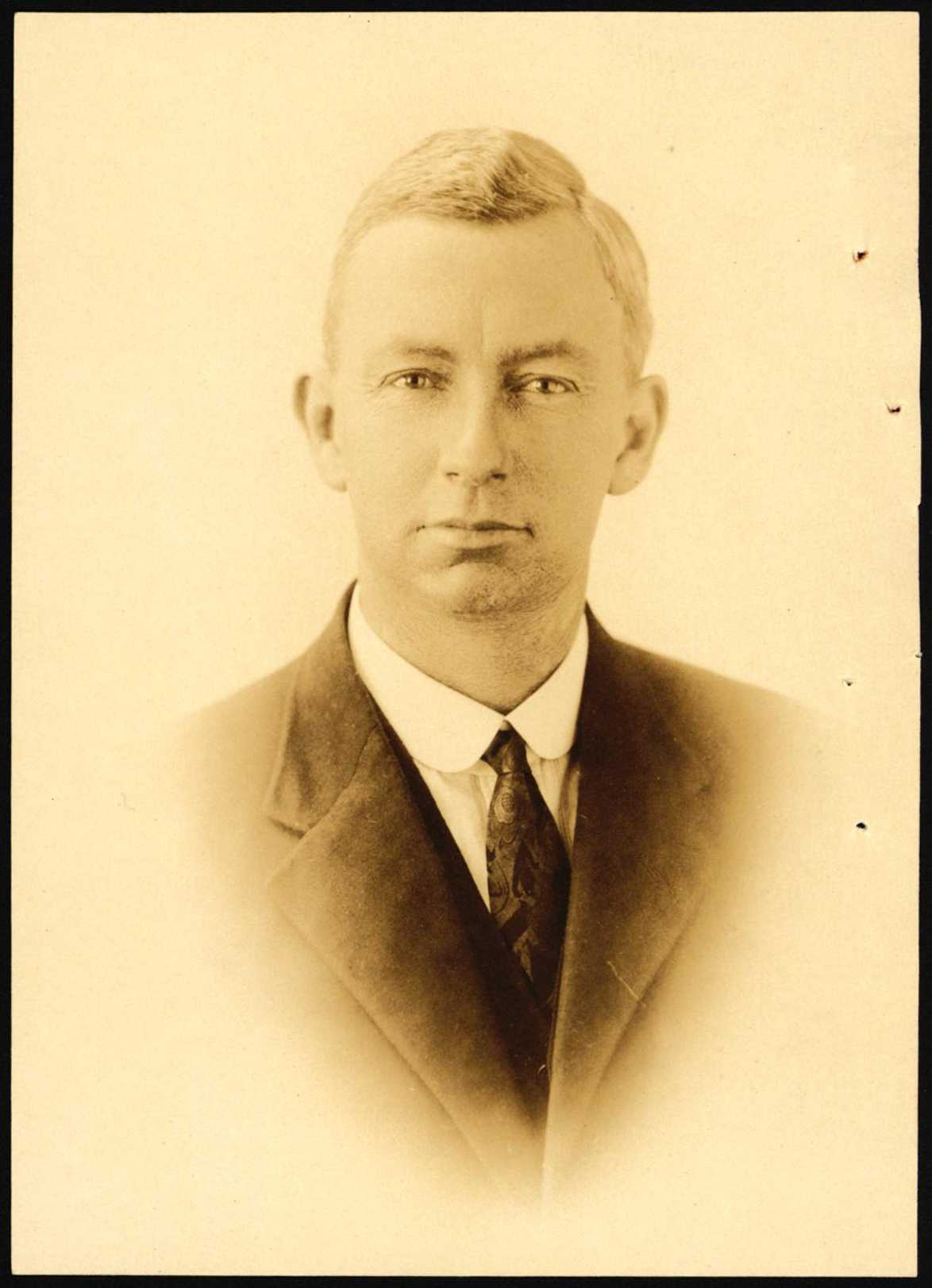
- Mulgan in 1926
- Born: 18 May 1881; Katikati, New Zealand
- Died: 29 August 1962 (aged 81); Lower Hutt, New Zealand
- Known for: Journalist, writer and broadcaster
- Spouse: Marguerita Blomfield Pickmere
- Children: 3
- Relatives: Edward Mulgan (father); John Mulgan (son)

Alan Edward Mulgan OBE (18 May 1881 – 29 August 1962) was a New Zealand journalist, writer and broadcaster. He was born in Katikati, Bay of Plenty, New Zealand, of Protestant Irish parents, on 18 May 1881, and died in Lower Hutt.

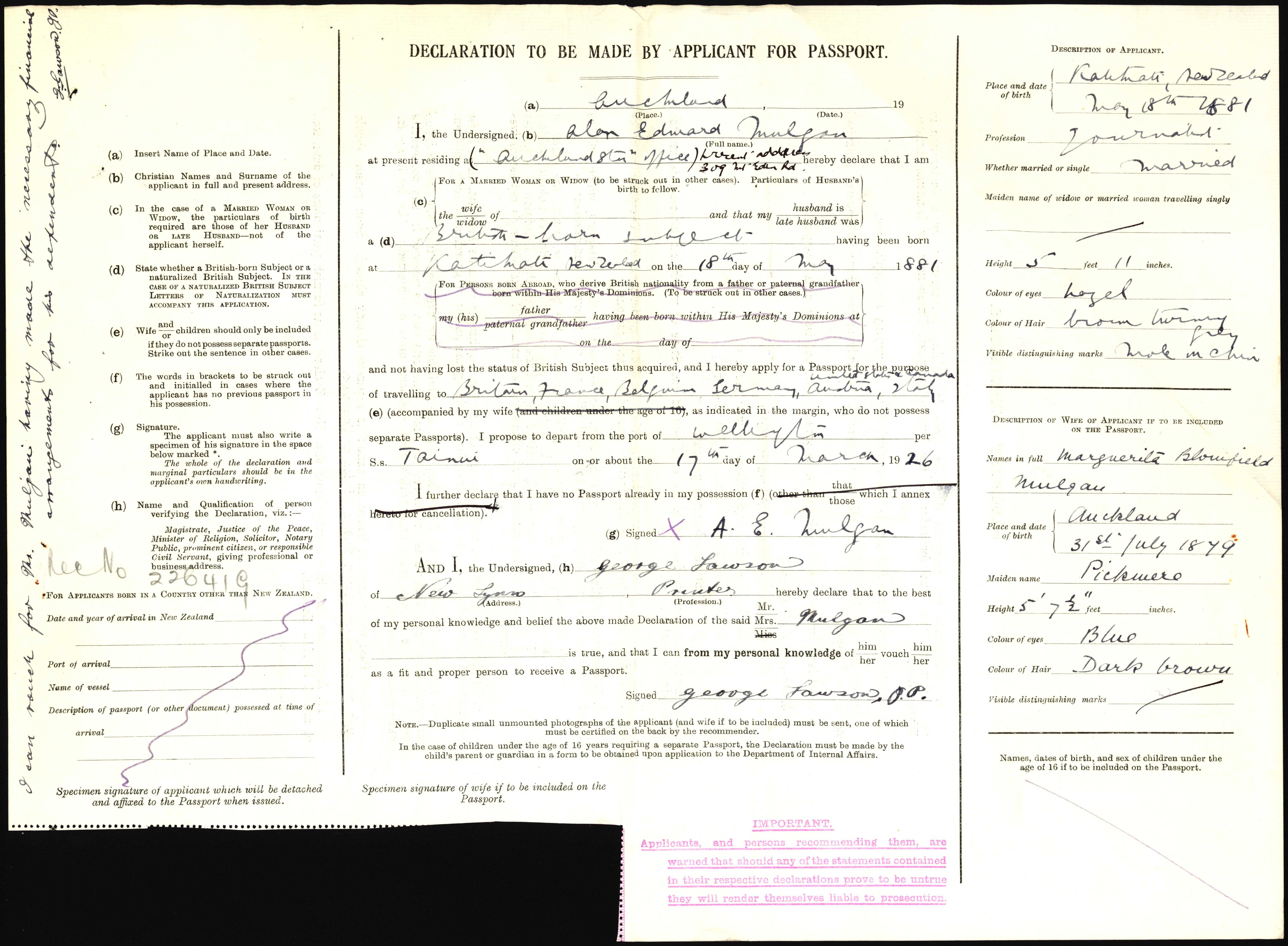
Alan Mulgan and Marguerita Blomfield Mulgan passport application (1926)

In 1935, Mulgan was awarded the King George V Silver Jubilee Medal. In the 1947 New Year Honours he was appointed an Officer of the Order of the British Empire for services to literature, journalism and broadcasting.

His father was Edward Ker Mulgan. Alan's elder son John Mulgan was also a writer and journalist.

== Published works ==
- The New Zealand Citizen: An Elementary Account of the Citizen's Rights and Duties and the Work of Government (with E.K. Mulgan) (1914, and later editions)
- Three Plays of New Zealand (1922)
- Maori & Pakeha: A History of New Zealand (with A.W. Shrimpton) (1922, and later editions)
- The English of the Line and Other Verses (1925)
- New Zealand, Country and People: An Account of the Country and Its People (with Constance Clyde) (1925, and later editions)
- Home: A New Zealander's Adventure (1927, and later editions)
- Golden Wedding (1932)
- Spur of Morning (1934)
- Building in New Zealand: The Architect and His Service (1934)
- A Pilgrim's Way in New Zealand (1935)
- Aldebaran and Other Verses (1937)
- The City of the Strait: Wellington and Its Province: A Centennial History (1939)
- First with the Sun (1939)
- Literature and Authorship in New Zealand (1943)
- From Track to Highway: A Short History of New Zealand (1944)
- Literature and Landscape in New Zealand (1946)
- Pastoral New Zealand: Its Riches and Its People: A Descriptive Survey of the Dominion's Farming (1946)
- The Māori in Picture: A Brief Survey of Māori Life Past and Present (1948)
- A Book of Australian and New Zealand Verse (edited, with Walter Murdoch) (1950)
- New Zealand Railways: Romance and Story (1954)
- The Making of a New Zealander (1958)
- Great Days in New Zealand Writing (1962)
- Golden Wedding, and Other Poems (1964)
