= Tim Mulgan =

New Zealand philosopher

Tim Mulgan FRSNZ
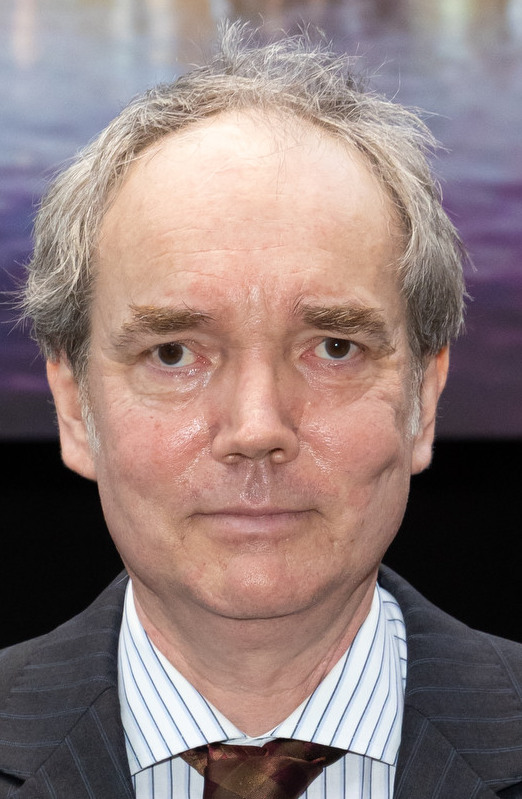
- Mulgan in 2022

Academic background
- Education: Wolfson College, Oxford, University of Otago
- Thesis: The Demands of Consequentialism (1994/5)
- Doctoral advisor: Derek Parfitt

Academic work
- Era: 21st century
- Discipline: Moral philosophy, philosophy of religion
- Main interests: Consequentialism, obligations to future people, "ethics for a broken world"

Timothy Paul Mulgan is a New Zealand philosopher currently serving as Professor of Philosophy at the University of Auckland and Professor of Moral and Political Philosophy at the University of St Andrews. His research interests include moral philosophy, specifically our obligations to future people, and philosophy of religion.

== Career ==
Mulgan grew up in Dunedin and studied philosophy at the University of Otago and Wolfson College, Oxford where he wrote his doctoral thesis on The Demands of Consequentialism under the supervision of Derek Parfitt. He has taught at the University of Otago and the University of St Andrews where he was appointed Professor of Moral and Political Philosophy in 2005. He currently still holds a part-time position at St Andrews whilst also serving as Professor of the Humanities at the University of Auckland.

== Awards ==
Mulgan is a Fellow of the Royal Society of New Zealand. In 2022 he was presented with the Humanities Aronui Medal for his "prolific, original, and influential contributions to philosophy in terms of our obligations to distant strangers and future people."

== Books authored by Tim Mulgan ==
- The Demands of Consequentialism. Oxford University Press, 2001.
- Future People: A Moderate Consequentialist Account of Our Obligations to Future Generations. Oxford University Press, 2006.
- Understanding Utilitarianism. Acumen Publishing, 2007. (part of the series 'Understanding Movements in Modern Thought').
- Ethics for a broken world: Imagining philosophy after catastrophe. Acumen Publishing, 2011.
- Purpose in the universe: the moral and metaphysical case for ananthropocentic purposivism. Oxford University Press, 2015.
- Philosophy for an Ending World. Oxford University Press, 2024.
