= John Mulgan =

New Zealand journalist, writer and editor

John Alan Edward Mulgan MC (31 December 1911 – 26 April 1945) was a New Zealand writer, journalist and editor, and the elder son of journalist and writer Alan Mulgan. His influence on New Zealand literature and identity grew in the years after his death. He is best known for his novel Man Alone (1939).

== Life ==
Gifted both academically and athletically, his New Zealand secondary education was at Wellington College (1925–1927) and Auckland Grammar School (1927–1929). Mulgan studied at Auckland University College (1930–1932), before attending Merton College, Oxford from November 1933. He was awarded a first in English in 1935, and in July 1935 took up a position at the Clarendon Press.

Mulgan held leftist political views and was alarmed by the rise of fascism in Europe and the response of the British government to it. In 1936, he was an observer for the New Zealand government at the League of Nations in Geneva. During this time, he wrote a series of articles on foreign affairs, titled "Behind the Cables", for the Auckland Star newspaper.

His view that war in Europe was inevitable led Mulgan to join the Territorial Army in 1938, and he was made second lieutenant in an infantry regiment. Posted to the Middle East in 1942, Mulgan was promoted to major and made second-in-command of his regiment. He saw action at El Alamein and fought alongside the New Zealand Expeditionary Force. He was impressed by the calibre of his compatriots and found meeting New Zealanders after being in England for so long to be a kind of "homecoming". He left the Royal West Kents Regiment after reporting his last Colonel as quite incompetent.

In 1943, Mulgan joined the Special Operations Executive and was sent to Greece in September to coordinate guerrilla action against the German forces. He was awarded the Military Cross for his actions. After the German withdrawal in 1944, Mulgan oversaw British compensation to Greek families who had helped the Allied forces (the Liquidation Fund).

== Death ==
On the day following Anzac Day 1945, Mulgan's body was discovered in his hotel room in Cairo. An investigation led by SOE and the British miliary determined that he had died the previous day of an overdose of morphine. The initial inquiry could not reach agreement, but a coronial inquiry by the British Consulate General recorded a verdict of suicide. The verdict was supported by a typed and signed letter written by Mulgan to his commanding officer, Dolbey, describing his intention to commit suicide and asking the officer to create a cover story for his family, suggesting possible causes of either an accidental overdose of morphine or a sudden death from fever. Mulgan also wrote two farewell letters to women friends. The reason Mulgan gave for his suicide in his letter to Dolbey is that he had discovered he was suffering from throat cancer, and did not want to live out his remaining time as an invalid. After his death, there was no medical evidence found for Mulgan's stated belief that he had cancer. Whilst most scholars accept the explanation of suicide, and attribute it to either unknown causes or Mulgan's deteriorating mental health, some people have speculated his death may not have been self-inflicted or may have occurred as a result of his involvement with SOE.

Mulgan is buried at Heliopolis military cemetery in Cairo. He was survived by his wife Gabrielle (married 1937) and son Richard (born 1940).

== Published works ==
- Poems of Freedom (editor, London, Victor Gollancz, 1938)
- The Concise Oxford Dictionary of English Literature by Sir Paul Harvey (abridged and edited, Oxford, Clarendon Press, 1939)
- The Emigrants: Early Travellers to the Antipodes (with Hector Bolitho, London, Selwyn and Blount, 1939)
- Man Alone (London, Selwyn and Blount, 1939) Republished 1960 (Pauls Book Arcade; with some changes to text) 2002 (Penguin pb) & 2021 (ISBN 9781776564576(Victoria University Press, Wellington & Ebook Libby)
- Report on Experience (London, Oxford University Press, 1947)
- Report on Experience (2 ed.). New Zealand: Victoria University Press. 2010 [1947]. ISBN 9780864736192. (also published in the UK (ISBN 9781848325548) and USA (ISBN 9781591147022)
- Introduction to English Literature (with D. M. Davin, Oxford, Clarendon Press, 1947)
- A Good Mail: Letters of John Mulgan: edited by Peter Whiteford (Wellington, Victoria University Press, 2011) ISBN 978-086473-693-2

== Other Works ==
- Gounelas, C. Dimitris; Parkin-Gounelas, Ruth (2023). John Mulgan and the Greek Left. Wellington, New Zealand: Te Herenga Waka University Press. ISBN 978-17769206-79. [ Te Herenga Waka University Press| https://teherengawakapress.co.nz/ ] see
- O'Sullivan, Vincent (2003). Long Journey to the Border: A Life of John Mulgan. Auckland: Penguin. ISBN 014301871X.
